= Opoku Ware I =

2nd Asantehene of the Ashanti Empire

- Asantehene
- Reign: c. 1720 – 1750
- Predecessor: Osei Kofi Tutu I
- Successor: Kusi Obodom
- Born: c. 1700
- Died: c. 1750

Opoku Ware I was the 2nd Asantehene of Oyoko heritage, who ruled the Ashanti Empire. Between 1718 and 1722, Opoku Ware became Asantehene during a period of civil disorder after the death of the 1st Asanthene. From 1720 to 1721, Opoku established his power.

Throughout his reign, Opoku carried out a series of campaigns that expanded the Ashanti Empire across what is today Ghana and eastern Ivory Coast. In domestic affairs, the Asantehene supported industry and manufacturing. He also carried out state reforms that include the creation of new offices for the administration of the state. At the latter part of his reign, Opoku Ware initiated a reform to reduce the power of the chiefs who administered the provinces of the empire. This reform led to a conspiracy that was repressed by the Asantehene. Opoku Ware died in 1750, unable to complete the reform. He was succeeded by Kusi Obodom.

== Ascension ==
Sources vary for the death of Opoku Ware's predecessor Osei Kofi Tutu I. Scholars such as Ivor Wilks, John Kofi Fynn and Albert Adu Boahen argue the death date of Osei Kofi Tutu was around 1712 or 1717. Scholars and historians including Margaret, Wilks and Boahen also argue that Osei Kofi Tutu I died during the campaign against the Akyem. The ascension of Opoku Ware occurred between 1718 and 1722 after civil strife following the death of Osei Kofi Tutu I. From 1720 - 1721, Opoku Ware was able to establish his power as Asantehene.

== Reign ==
=== Campaigns ===
Opoku Ware subdued a revolt by the Akyem, Wassa, Aowin and Denkyira. This commenced with an attack on Akyem in 1720–21. In the early 18th century, Aowin King Ebrimoro invaded Kumasi. The capital was sacked in the process and Ashanti royals including Opoku Ware's mother, were taken into captivity or massacred. This invasion was defeated by Opoku Ware. Between 1719 and 1722, the Ashanti defeated the Aowin, claiming Ahafo which was an Aowin territory, as a part of the Ashanti Empire. In 1723-24 Opoku oversaw the invasion of the Bono state which made Bono a part of the empire.

In 1726, Ashanti invaded Wassa forcing Wassa King Ntsiful I to move his capital to Abrade near the coast until the 19th century. In 1732, the Ashanti Empire invaded Western Gonja and Gyaman as well as Banda in 1740. Two years later, the Ashanti incorporated the Akyem states of Abuakwa and Kotoku. In the process, the Ashanti occupied Accra and the coastal towns to its east. The Ga-Adangbe of the southeastern plains, represented by Accra ruler Tete Ahene Akwa, accepted Ashanti overrule but the Ga were able to negotiate an exception from paying tribute. After the conquest of the Akyem states in 1742, the Dutch paid a regular stipend on trade goods to Ashanti as rent to occupy the 17th century fort and land at Accra. Eastern Gonja was absorbed into the state by 1744 with the conquest of Dagbon occurring from 1744 to 1745.

By the end of his reign the Ashanti encompassed the northern part of what is today Ghana as well as north-eastern Ivory Coast. By the 1740s, the Ashanti held control over the entire coast of Ghana with the exception of areas under Fante influence near the Cape Coast

=== Infrastructure ===
L.F. Rømer records in 1760 that the King enlisted the services of four Dutch-men during his reign, to construct a distillery in Kumasi. According to historians Fage and Latorre, this attempt was unsuccessful. Danish agent Nog, visited Opoku Ware's court near the mid 18th century and he noted the Asantehene's support for craft industry. Opoku Ware introduced the thread of imported but unraveled woolen and silken textiles into the local cotton cloths. Nog observed this cloth factory set up by the King.

Some of his subjects were able to spin cotton, and they wove bands of it, three fingers wide. When twelve long strips were sewn together it became a “Pantjes” or sash. One strip might be white, the other one blue or sometimes there was a red among them...[Asantehene] Opoke [Ware] bought silk taffeta and materials of all colours. The artists unravelled them.

— Nog.

The Ashanti road Route V (a) was opened for traffic in 1749.

=== Reforms ===
Opoku Ware promoted reforms in Ashanti revenue infrastructure through the introduction of death duties. Reindorf states that Opoku Ware adopted the policy of death duties as well as an accounting system on standard weights for measuring gold upon the guidance of the King of Techiman following the Ashanti conquest of the state in the early 18th century.

the whole treasure of the [Techiman] kingdom was taken by the Asantes, whose power was greatly increased by this victory. Several improvements were, by Amo Yaw's [King of Techiman] advice, made in the government and social conditions of Asante. He taught Opoku to make gold and silver weights, to claim the estate of a deceased chief or general, also to enact laws fining offenders in order to add to his power and reduce that of his subjects.

Opoku reorganized the Gyase. During the reign of Osei Kofi Tutu I, the Gyase was charged with domestic duties in the King's palace. Under Opoku Ware, the Gyase was involved in the administration of the state. It had two sub offices named Samang and Kronko under the Osei Tutu government. The Gyasewa, Dadiesoaba and Ananta were three new sub institutions created under the Gyase during the reign of Opoku Ware.

The King placed the Sanaahene under the auspices of the Gyasewa. The Fotuosanfuohene was created to aid the Sanaahene with the operations of the treasury. Under Opoku Ware, the Sanaahene was tasked with war expenditure and domestic purchases. The Nsumankwahene was created by Opoku Ware as the King's physician. After the war against Techiman in the early 18th century, all medicine men and fetish priests were placed under the Nsumankwahene. The Nsumankwa office itself was placed within the jurisdiction of the Ananata. The Nsumankwahene also headed the medical corps in battle.

== Political development ==
Banditry was prominent in the Gold Coast region during the 18th century. L.F. Rømer reports in 1760 about Antufi, a highwayman who was active in the Ashanti southern metropolitan districts. Antufi had an estimated 2000 followers and he had opposed the Ashanti government for 20 years. According to Rømer, Opoku Ware "offered Antufi whatever he wanted" on condition Antufi ceased banditry operations against the King's subjects.

In 1819, Bowdich described the provincial districts of Ashanti noting that "every subject state was placed under the immediate care of an Ashantee chief, generally resident in the capital, who seldom visited it, but to receive the tribute from the native ruler, for whose conduct he was in a reasonable degree responsible." After successful expansionist campaigns, Opoku Ware proposed reforms that curtailed the power of the chiefs in the provincial districts. These chiefs placed in supervision of provincial areas had grown more powerful after Ashanti's expansionism in the mid 18th century. Opoku Ware's reform caused political turmoil in the 1740s. In the 1820s Joseph Dupuis wrote about the political upheaval in Ashanti during the latter part of Opoku Ware's reign.

In this stage of politics Sai Apoko [Opoku Ware], in the latter part of his reign, enacted new codes of laws, adapted for the government of the various departments of the state; but some of them being considered inimical to the interests of the chiefs, and as they represented it again, to the public welfare, a dangerous conspiracy was raised against the throne, in the very heart of the kingdom. The capital, moreover, took a share in these transactions, and the King was obliged to fly his palace by night, and seek refuge at Juaben, where he convened a sort of diet; but some of his enemies were already in arms, and he was compelled to the same alternative...

— Dupuis.

At Juaben, Opoku Ware was able to mobilize support from ally chiefs and defeat the rebels as well as reoccupy Kumasi. The rebels were pardoned after their defeat by the King on condition that Opoku's policies to curtail the power of provincial chiefs be respected. Opoku Ware died in 1750 and was unable to implement this policy. Hagan argues that this attempt by Opoku Ware to reduce the influence of the aristocracy served as an inspiration for the bureaucratic reforms of Asantehene Osei Kwadwo.
