= Opoku Frefre =

Political figure in the Asante Empire

Gyaasewahene
- Succeeded by: Adu Damete

Personal details
- Born: c. 1760 Anyatiase
- Died: 1826
- Spouse: Three
- Children: 63 sons and unknown number of daughters

Military service
- Branch/service: Asante Army
- Rank: General

Opoku Frefre (c. 1760–1826) was a political official and military commander who served as the 2nd Gyaasewahene of the Asante Empire. Originally a servant, Opoku Frefre elevated in ranks to become head of the King's treasury under Asantehene Osei Kwame. His career was a reflection of the growth of bureaucracy and meritocracy in Asante. He died during the Katamanso War of 1826.

== Early life ==
Opoku Frefre was born around 1760 at Anyatiase near Lake Bosomtwe. His mother was Ama Nyaako Pakyi but not much is known about his father. Opoku was his birth name as Frefre (nimble) was assigned to him as a nickname by Asantehene Osei Kwadwo because of his talents.

== Political career ==
Opoku initially served as the bedchamber doorkeeper to Oyokohene chief "Boapon" between 1765 – 1775. Upon Boapon's death, Opoku Frefre informed Asantehene Osei Kwadwo about the gold dust which was hidden by his master to avoid taxation. Osei Kwadwo transferred Opoku to be trained in fiscal affairs by Fotosanfohene (Head of the weighers or cashiers (Note: McCaskie explains the title on page 282. So does Wilks.)) Esom Adu in the treasury department. After the death of Esom Adu around 1790, Opoku Frefre succeeded him as Fotosanfohene and rose up in ranks as Gyaasewahene within this period. One major task of Opoku Frefre in this fotosan division, was to assess the value of properties and estates belonging to wealthy Asante figures and lords, in order to impose death duties.

=== Gyaasewahene ===
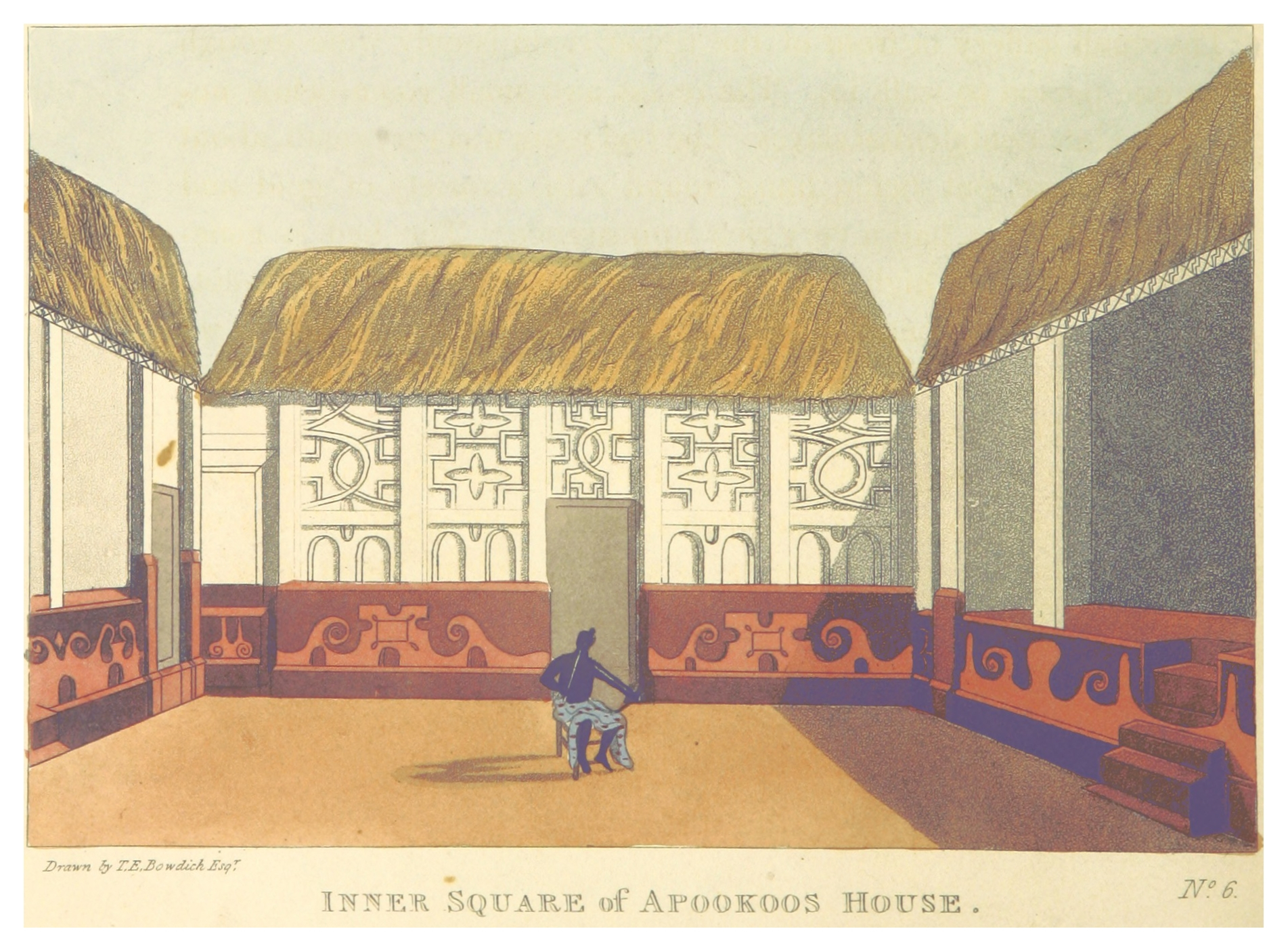
The Exchequer Court in Kumasi c. 1817 by Thomas Bowdich. (Note: The version of the image in the source is black and white.)

As Gyaasewahene, Opoku Frefre was assisted by a counselor called Kwadwo Adusei who was appointed by Asantehene Osei Bonsu in the early 19th century. These two were among the most influential officials in Asante during the 1810s. It was Frefre and Adusei who led Kumasi affairs when Asantehene Osei Bonsu paid a brief visit to his country house in Bremang in 1817. They also gave assent on behalf of the Asantehene on a preliminary treaty with the British Empire.

Opoku Frefre was tasked with possessing the keys to the Asante Great Chest which was kept in a dedicated room of the palace. In addition, Opoku was a general of the Asante army. During his tenure in the early 19th century, Frefre was able to convince Osei Bonsu to make the office of Gyaasewahene probable to be inherited by his sons. Such offices had traditionally in Asante only been inheritable by the sons of the holders' sisters.

In 1817, Opoku Frefre was documented as Gyaasewahene to have been the overseer of the Company of State Traders. The Batahene (trade chief) was a subordinate of the Gyaasewahene who further organized the logistical support for the company's activies. Within that same year, he complained that "there were too many slaves in the country" and they posed a threat to public order.

Opoku had a Muslim secretary as part of his staff who recorded "greater political events." But this literate secretary did not record treasury accounts which was instead managed by a local association and "all calculations were made, explained, and recorded by cowries." Opoku Frefre was a prominent member of the Inner Council also known as Privy Council, which was emerging as an alternative to the Asantehenemanhyiamu in the early 19th century. Bowdich wrote that Opoku Frefre held a "sort of exchequer court" at his house daily to preside on all cases involving tribute or revenue.

=== Military expeditions ===
Opoku's first reported military command came during an Asante conflict with the Asen in 1778. In 1811 Opoku Frefre led the Asante Army in restoring the rule of the empire over Akyem Abuakwa. Amid the early 19th war against Gyaman, the Imam of Bondoukou was taken captive by Opoku Frefre and before his release, he swore and oath along with a written treaty to avoid hostilities with Asante.

== Death and legacy ==
Opoku Frefre was badly injured in Katamanso War of 1826 and his troops retreated in defeat. He committed suicide in response. Opoku had three wives, sixty-three sons and an unknown number of daughters. The elephant tail was a ceremonial symbol granted to the wealthy populace of Asante. Opoku Frefre acquired this symbol twice in the 1790s and in 1817. His declared gold was estimated to be over £6,000 in value by 1817.
