= Bureaucracy =

Administrative system governing any large institution

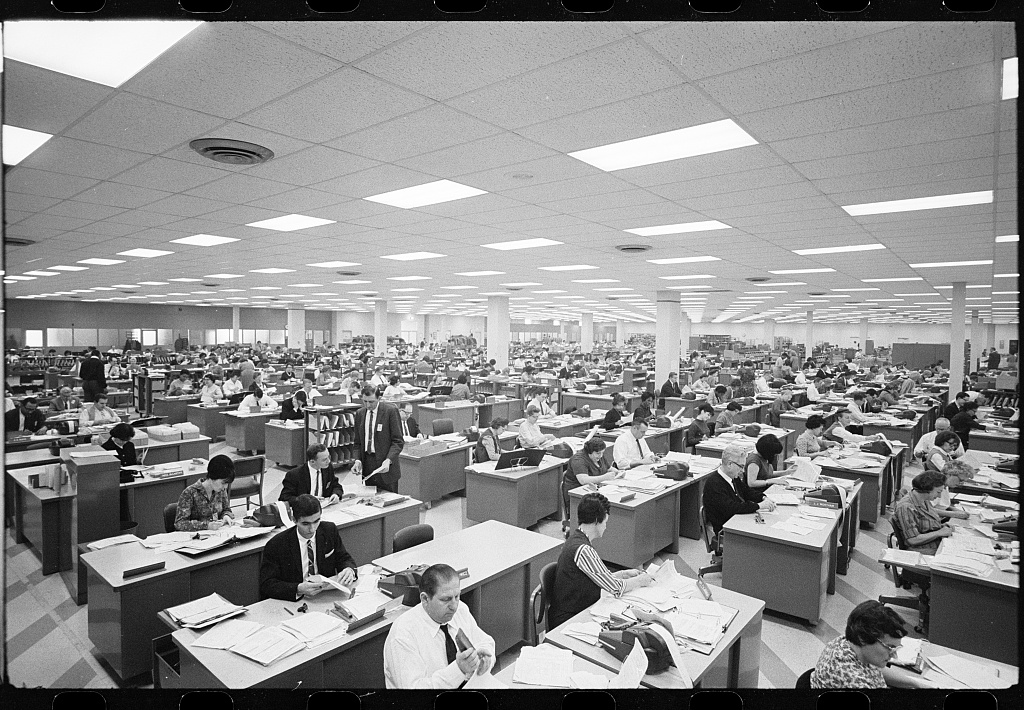
The office of the US's IRS, 1965. Taxation systems can often be described as bureaucratic.

Bureaucracy (/bjʊəˈrɒkrəsi/ bure-OK-rə-see) is a system of organization where laws or regulatory authority are implemented by civil servants (non-elected officials). Historically, a bureaucracy was a government administration managed by departments staffed with non-elected officials. Today, bureaucracy is the administrative system governing any large institution, whether publicly owned or privately owned. The public administration in many jurisdictions is an example of bureaucracy, as is any centralized hierarchical structure of an institution, including corporations, societies, nonprofit organizations, and clubs.

There are two key dilemmas in bureaucracy. The first dilemma relates to whether bureaucrats should be autonomous or directly accountable to their political masters. The second dilemma relates to bureaucrats' responsibility to follow preset rules, and what degree of latitude they may have to determine appropriate solutions for circumstances that are unaccounted for in advance.

Various commentators have argued for the necessity of bureaucracies in modern society. The German sociologist Max Weber argued that bureaucracy constitutes the most efficient and rational way in which human activity can be organized and that systematic processes and organized hierarchies are necessary to maintain order, maximize efficiency, and eliminate favoritism. On the other hand, Weber also saw unfettered bureaucracy as a threat to individual freedom, with the potential of trapping individuals in an impersonal "iron cage" of rule-based, rational control.

== Etymology and usage ==
The term bureaucracy originated in the French language: it combines the French word bureau – 'desk' or 'office' – with the Greek word κράτος (kratos) – 'rule' or 'political power'. The French economist Jacques Claude Marie Vincent de Gournay coined the word in the mid-18th century. Gournay never wrote the term down but a letter from a contemporary later quoted him:

The late M. de Gournay ... sometimes used to say: "We have an illness in France which bids fair to play havoc with us; this illness is called bureaumania." Sometimes he used to invent a fourth or fifth form of government under the heading of "bureaucracy."

— Baron von Grimm (1723–1807)

The first known English-language use dates to 1818 with Irish novelist Lady Morgan referring to the apparatus used by the British government to subjugate Ireland as "the Bureaucratie, or office tyranny, by which Ireland has so long been governed". By the mid-19th century the word appeared in a more neutral sense, referring to a system of public administration in which offices were held by unelected career officials. In this context bureaucracy was seen as a distinct form of management, often subservient to a monarchy.

In the 1920s the German sociologist Max Weber expanded the definition to include any system of administration conducted by trained professionals according to fixed rules. Weber saw bureaucracy as a relatively positive development; however, by 1944 the Austrian economist Ludwig von Mises opined in the context of his experience in the Nazi regime that the term bureaucracy was "always applied with an opprobrious connotation", and by 1957 the American sociologist Robert Merton suggested that the term bureaucrat had become an "epithet, a Schimpfwort" in some circumstances.

The word bureaucracy is also used in politics and government with a disapproving tone to disparage official rules that appear to make it difficult—by insistence on procedure and compliance to rule, regulation, and law—to get things done. In workplaces, the word is used very often to blame complicated rules, processes, and written work that are interpreted as obstacles rather than safeguards and accountability assurances. Socio-bureaucracy would then refer to certain social influences that may affect the function of a society.

In modern usage, modern bureaucracy has been defined as comprising four features:

1. hierarchy: clearly defined spheres of competence and divisions of labor;
2. continuity: a structure where administrators have a full-time salary and advance within the structure;
3. impersonality: prescribed rules and operating rules rather than arbitrary actions;
4. expertise: officials are chosen according to merit, have been trained, and hold access to knowledge.

== History ==
=== Ancient ===
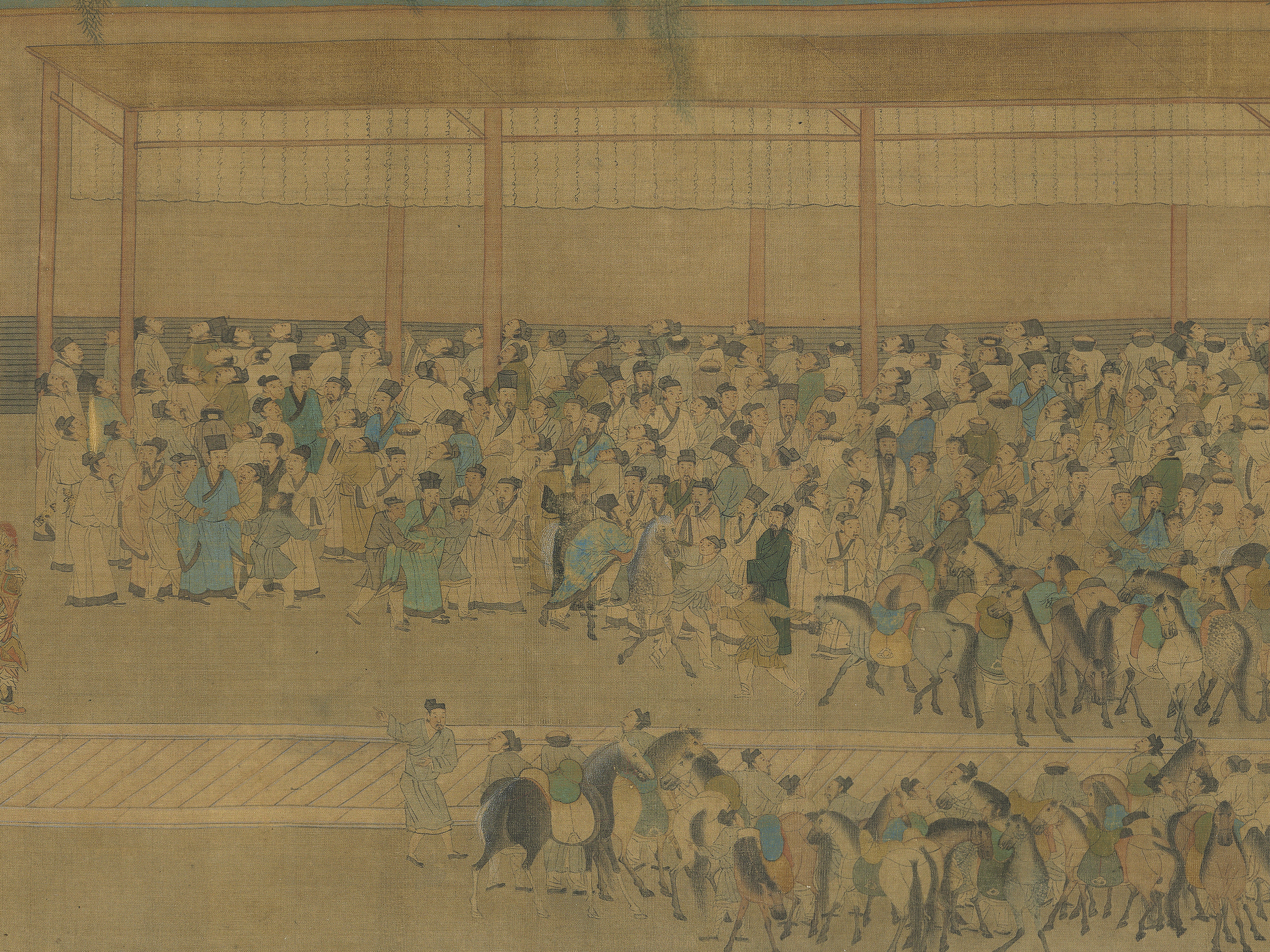
Students competed in imperial examinations to receive a position in the bureaucracy of Imperial China.

Although the term bureaucracy first originated in the mid-18th century, organized and consistent administrative systems existed much earlier. The development of writing (c. 3500 BC) and the use of documents was a critical component of such systems. The first definitive example of bureaucracy occurred in ancient Sumer, where an emergent class of scribes used clay tablets to document and carry out various administrative functions, such as the management of taxes, workers, and public goods/resources like granaries. Similarly, Ancient Egypt had a hereditary class of scribes that administered a civil-service bureaucracy.

==== Ancient China ====
In China, when the Qin dynasty (221–206 BC) unified China under the Legalist system, the emperor assigned administration to dedicated officials rather than nobility, ending feudalism in China, replacing it with a centralized, bureaucratic government. The form of government created by the first emperor and his advisors was used by later dynasties to structure their own government. Under this system, the government thrived, as talented individuals could be more easily identified in the transformed society. The Han dynasty (202 BC – 220 AD) established a complicated bureaucracy based on the teachings of Confucius, who emphasized the importance of ritual in family, relationships, and politics. With each subsequent dynasty, the bureaucracy evolved. In 165 BC, Emperor Wen introduced the first method of recruitment to civil service through examinations. Emperor Wu (r. 141–87 BC) cemented the ideology of Confucius into mainstream governance by installing a system of recommendation and nomination in government service known as xiaolian, and a national academy where officials would select candidates to take part in an examination of the Confucian classics, from which Emperor Wu would select officials.

In the Sui dynasty (581–618) and the subsequent Tang dynasty (618–907) the shi class would begin to present itself by means of the fully standardized civil service examination system, of partial recruitment of those who passed standard exams and earned an official degree. Yet recruitment by recommendations to office was still prominent in both dynasties. It was not until the Song dynasty (960–1279) that the recruitment of those who passed the exams and earned degrees was given greater emphasis and significantly expanded. During the Song dynasty (960–1279) the bureaucracy became meritocratic. Following the Song reforms, competitive examinations took place to determine which candidates qualified to hold given positions. The imperial examination system lasted until 1905, six years before the Qing dynasty collapsed, marking the end of China's traditional bureaucratic system.

==== Ancient Rome ====
A hierarchy of regional proconsuls and their deputies administered the Roman Empire. The reforms of Diocletian (Emperor from 284 to 305) doubled the number of administrative districts and led to a large-scale expansion of Roman bureaucracy. The early Christian author Lactantius (c. 250 – c. 325) claimed that Diocletian's reforms led to widespread economic stagnation, since "the provinces were divided into minute portions, and many presidents and a multitude of inferior officers lay heavy on each territory." After the Empire split, the Byzantine Empire developed a notoriously complicated administrative hierarchy, and in the 20th century the term Byzantine came to refer to any complex bureaucratic structure.

=== Modern ===
==== Persia ====
Uzun Hasan's conquest of most of mainland Iran shifted the seat of power to the east, where the Aq Qoyunlu adopted Iranian customs for administration and culture. In the Iranian areas, Uzun Hasan preserved the previous bureaucratic structure along with its secretaries, who belonged to families that had in a number of instances served under different dynasties for several generations. The four top civil posts of the Aq Qoyunlu were all occupied by Iranians, which under Uzun Hasan included: the vizier, who led the great council (divan); the mostawfi al-mamalek, high-ranking financial accountants; the mohrdar, who affixed the state seal; and the marakur 'stable master', who supervised the royal court. Through the use of his increasing revenue, Uzun Hasan was able to buy the approval of the ulama (clergy) and the mainly Iranian urban elite, while also taking care of the impoverished rural inhabitants.

The Safavid state was one of checks and balance, both within the government and on a local level. At the apex of this system was the Shah, with total power over the state, legitimized by his bloodline as a sayyid, or descendant of Muhammad. To ensure transparency and avoid decisions being made that circumvented the Shah, a complex system of bureaucracy and departmental procedures had been put in place that prevented fraud. Every office had a deputy or superintendent, whose job was to keep records of all actions of the state officials and report directly to the Shah. The Shah himself exercised his own measures for keeping his ministers under control by fostering an atmosphere of rivalry and competitive surveillance. And since the Safavid society was meritocratic, and successions seldom were made on the basis of heritage, this meant that government offices constantly felt the pressure of being under surveillance and had to make sure they governed in the best interest of their leader, and not merely their own.

The Ottomans adopted Persian bureaucratic traditions and culture.

==== Russia ====
The Russian autocracy survived the Time of Troubles and the rule of weak or corrupt tsars because of the strength of the government's central bureaucracy. Government functionaries continued to serve, regardless of the ruler's legitimacy or the boyar faction controlling the throne. In the 17th century, the bureaucracy expanded dramatically. The number of government departments (prikazy; sing., prikaz ) increased from twenty-two in 1613 to eighty by mid-century. Although the departments often had overlapping and conflicting jurisdictions, the central government, through provincial governors, was able to control and regulate all social groups, as well as trade, manufacturing, and even the Eastern Orthodox Church.

The tsarist bureaucracy, alongside the military, the judiciary and the Russian Orthodox Church, played a major role in solidifying and maintaining the rule of the Tsars in the Tsardom of Russia (1547–1721) and in the Russian Empire (1721–1917). In the 19th century, the forces of change brought on by the Industrial Revolution propelled many countries, especially in Europe, to significant social changes. However, due to the conservative nature of the Tsarist regime and its desire to maintain power and control, social change in Russia lagged behind that of Europe.

Russian-speakers referred to bureaucrats as chinovniki (чиновники) because of the rank or chin (чин) which they held.

==== Asante Empire ====
Bureaucracy in the Asante Empire emerged from the reforms of Asantehene Osei Kwadwo in the 18th century. The government was built upon a sophisticated bureaucracy in Kumasi, with separate ministries which saw to the handling of state affairs. Asante's Foreign Office was based in Kumasi. Despite the small size of the office, it allowed the state to pursue complex negotiations with foreign powers. The Office was divided into departments that handled Asante relations separately with the British, French, Dutch, and Arabs. Scholars of Asante history, such as Larry Yarak and Ivor Wilkes, disagree over the power of this sophisticated bureaucracy in comparison to the Asantehene. However, both scholars agree that it was a sign of a highly developed government with a complex system of checks and balances.

==== United Kingdom ====
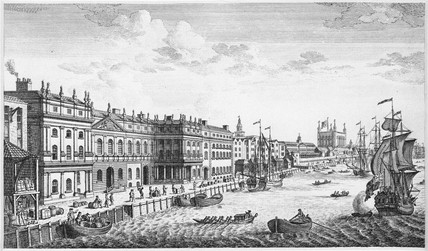
The 18th century Department of Excise developed a sophisticated bureaucracy. Pictured, the Custom House in the City of London.

Instead of the inefficient and often corrupt system of tax farming that prevailed in absolutist states such as France, the Exchequer was able to exert control over the entire system of tax revenue and government expenditure. By the late 18th century, the ratio of fiscal bureaucracy to population in Britain was approximately 1 in 1300, almost four times larger than the second most heavily bureaucratized nation, France. Thomas Taylor Meadows, Britain's consul in Guangzhou, argued in his Desultory Notes on the Government and People of China (1847) that "the long duration of the Chinese empire is solely and altogether owing to the good government which consists in the advancement of men of talent and merit only", and that the British must reform their civil service by making the institution meritocratic. Influenced by the ancient Chinese imperial examination, the Northcote–Trevelyan Report of 1854 recommended that recruitment should be on the basis of merit determined through competitive examination, candidates should have a solid general education to enable inter-departmental transfers, and promotion should be through achievement rather than "preferment, patronage, or purchase". This led to implementation of His Majesty's Civil Service as a systematic, meritocratic civil service bureaucracy.

In the British civil service, just as it was in China, entrance to the civil service was usually based on a general education in ancient classics, which similarly gave bureaucrats greater prestige. The Cambridge-Oxford ideal of the civil service was identical to the Confucian ideal of a general education in world affairs through humanism. Well into the 20th century, classics, literature, history and language remained heavily favoured in British civil service examinations. In the period of 1925–1935, 67 percent of British civil service entrants consisted of such graduates. Like the Chinese model's consideration of personal values, the British model also took personal physique and character into account.

==== France ====
Like the British, the development of French bureaucracy was influenced by the Chinese system. Under King Louis XIV, the old nobility had neither power nor political influence, their only privilege being exemption from taxes. The dissatisfied noblemen complained about this "unnatural" state of affairs, and discovered similarities between absolute monarchy and bureaucratic despotism. With the translation of Confucian texts during the Enlightenment, the concept of a meritocracy reached intellectuals in the West, who saw it as an alternative to the traditional ancien regime of Europe. Western perception of China even in the 18th century admired the Chinese bureaucratic system as favourable over European governments for its seeming meritocracy; Voltaire claimed that the Chinese had "perfected moral science" and François Quesnay advocated an economic and political system modeled after that of the Chinese. The governments of China, Egypt, Peru and Russian Empress Catherine the Great were regarded as models of Enlightened Despotism, admired by such figures as Diderot, D'Alembert and Voltaire.

Napoleonic France adopted this meritocracy system and soon saw a rapid and dramatic expansion of government, accompanied by the rise of the French civil service and its complex systems of bureaucracy. This phenomenon became known as "bureaumania". In the early 19th century, Napoleon attempted to reform the bureaucracies of France and other territories under his control by the imposition of the standardized Napoleonic Code. But paradoxically, that led to even further growth of the bureaucracy.

French civil service examinations adopted in the late 19th century were also heavily based on general cultural studies. These features have been likened to the earlier Chinese model.

==== The industrialized/globalized world ====
By the mid-19th century, bureaucratic forms of administration were firmly in place across the industrialized world. Thinkers like John Stuart Mill (1806–1873) and Karl Marx (1818–1883) began to theorize about the economic functions and power-structures of bureaucracy in contemporary life. Max Weber was the first to endorse bureaucracy as a necessary feature of modernity, and by the late-19th century bureaucratic forms had begun their spread from government to other large-scale institutions. The tertiary sector of economies began to increase relative to the size of the primary and secondary sectors. The term "white-collar" as applicable to bureaucratic employees occurs from 1910.

Within capitalist systems, informal bureaucratic structures began to appear in the form of corporate power hierarchies, as detailed in mid-20th century works like The Organization Man (1956) and The Man in the Gray Flannel Suit (1955). Meanwhile, in the Soviet Union and Eastern Bloc countries, a powerful class of bureaucratic administrators, the nomenklatura, came to govern nearly all aspects of public life — especially when state planning and control expanded into the economic sphere.

The 1980s brought a backlash against perceptions of "big government" and of its associated bureaucracy. Politicians like Margaret Thatcher and Ronald Reagan gained power promising to eliminate government regulatory bureaucracies, which they saw as overbearing, and to return economic production to a more purely capitalistic mode, which they saw as more efficient. In the commercial world, managers like Jack Welch gained fortune and renown by eliminating bureaucratic structures inside corporations. Still, in the modern world, most organized institutions rely on bureaucratic systems to manage information, process records, and administer complex systems, although the decline of paperwork and the widespread use of electronic databases is transforming the way bureaucracies function.

== Theories ==
=== Karl Marx ===
Karl Marx theorized about the role and function of bureaucracy in his Critique of Hegel's Philosophy of Right, published in 1843. In Philosophy of Right, Hegel had supported the role of specialized officials in public administration, although he never used the term bureaucracy himself. By contrast, Marx was opposed to bureaucracy. Marx posited that while corporate and government bureaucracy seem to operate in opposition, in actuality they mutually rely on one another to exist. He wrote that "The Corporation is civil society's attempt to become state; but the bureaucracy is the state which has really made itself into civil society."

=== Leon Trotsky ===
Leon Trotsky developed a critical theory of the emerging Soviet bureaucracy during the early years of the Soviet Union. According to political scientist Thomas M. Twiss, Trotsky associated bureaucratism with authoritarianism, excessive centralism and conservatism. Social theorist Martin Krygier had noted the impact of Trotsky's post-1923 writings in shaping receptive views of bureaucracy among later Marxists and many non-Marxists. Twiss argued that Trotsky's theory of Soviet bureaucracy was essential for a study of Soviet history and understanding the process of capitalist restoration in Russia and Eastern Europe. Political scientist, Baruch Knei-Paz argued Trotsky had, above all others, written "to show the historical and social roots of Stalinism" as a bureaucratic system.

One of the predictions made by Trotsky in his 1936 work, The Revolution Betrayed, was that the USSR would come before a disjuncture: either the toppling of the ruling bureaucracy by means of a political revolution, or capitalist restoration led by the bureaucracy:

The fall of the present bureaucratic dictatorship, if it were not replaced by a new socialist power, would thus mean a return to capitalist relations with a catastrophic decline of industry and culture.

=== John Stuart Mill ===
Writing in the early 1860s, political scientist John Stuart Mill theorized that successful monarchies were essentially bureaucracies, and found evidence of their existence in Imperial China, the Russian Empire, and the regimes of Europe. Mill referred to bureaucracy as a distinct form of government, separate from representative democracy. He believed bureaucracies had certain advantages, most importantly the accumulation of experience in those who actually conduct the affairs. Nevertheless, he believed this form of governance compared poorly to representative government, as it relied on appointment rather than direct election. Mill wrote that ultimately the bureaucracy stifles the mind, and that "a bureaucracy always tends to become a pedantocracy."

=== Max Weber ===
The fully developed bureaucratic apparatus compares with other organisations exactly as does the machine with the non-mechanical modes of production.

— Max Weber

The German sociologist Max Weber (1864–1920) was the first to study bureaucracy formally, and his works led to the popularization of this term. In his essay Bureaucracy, published in his magnum opus, Economy and Society in 1921, Weber described many ideal-typical forms of public administration, government, and business. His ideal-typical bureaucracy, whether public or private, is characterized by:

- hierarchical organization
- formal lines of authority (chain of command)
- a fixed area of activity
- rigid division of labor
- regular and continuous execution of assigned tasks
- all decisions and powers specified and restricted by regulations
- officials with expert training in their fields
- career advancement dependent on technical qualifications
- qualifications evaluated by organizational rules, not by individuals

Weber listed several preconditions for the emergence of bureaucracy, including an increase in the amount of space and population being administered, an increase in the complexity of the administrative tasks being carried out, and the existence of a monetary economy requiring a more efficient administrative system. Development of communication and transportation technologies make more efficient administration possible, and democratization and rationalization of culture results in demands for equal treatment.

Although he was not necessarily an admirer of bureaucracy, Weber saw bureaucratization as the most efficient and rational way of organizing human activity and therefore as the key to rational-legal authority, indispensable to the modern world. Furthermore, he saw it as the key process in the ongoing rationalization of Western society. Weber also saw bureaucracy, however, as a threat to individual freedoms, and ongoing bureaucratization as leading to a "polar night of icy darkness", in which increasing rationalization of human life traps individuals in a soulless "iron cage" of bureaucratic, rule-based, rational control. Weber's critical study of the bureaucratization of society became one of the most enduring parts of his work. Many aspects of modern public administration are based on his work, and a classic, hierarchically organized civil service of the Continental type is called a "Weberian civil service" or a "Weberian bureaucracy". Social scientists debate whether Weberian bureaucracy contributes to economic growth.

Political scientist Jan Vogler challenges Max Weber's characterization of modern bureaucracies. Whereas Weber describes bureaucracies as entailing strict merit recruitment, clearly delineated career-paths for bureaucrats, the full separation of bureaucratic operations from politics, and mutually exclusive spheres of competence for government agencies, Vogler argues that the overwhelming majority of existing public administrative systems are not like this. Instead, modern bureaucracies require only "minimal competence" from candidates for bureaucratic offices, leaving space for biases in recruitment processes that give preferential treatment to members of specific social, economic, or ethnic groups, which are observed in many real-world bureaucratic systems. Bureaucracies are also not strictly separated from politics.

=== Woodrow Wilson ===
Writing as an academic while a professor at Bryn Mawr College, Woodrow Wilson's essay The Study of Administration argued for bureaucracy as a professional cadre, devoid of allegiance to fleeting politics. Wilson advocated a bureaucracy that:

...is a part of political life only as the methods of the counting house are a part of the life of society; only as machinery is part of the manufactured product. But it is, at the same time, raised very far above the dull level of mere technical detail by the fact that through its greater principles it is directly connected with the lasting maxims of political wisdom, the permanent truths of political progress.

Wilson did not advocate a replacement of rule by the governed, he simply advised that, "Administrative questions are not political questions. Although politics sets the tasks for administration, it should not be suffered to manipulate its offices". This essay became a foundation for the study of public administration in America.

=== Ludwig von Mises ===
In his 1944 work Bureaucracy, the Austrian economist Ludwig von Mises compared bureaucratic management to profit management. Profit management, he argued, is the most effective method of organization when the services rendered may be checked by economic calculation of profit and loss. When, however, the service in question cannot be subjected to economic calculation, bureaucratic management is necessary. He did not oppose universally bureaucratic management; on the contrary, he argued that bureaucracy is an indispensable method for social organization, for it is the only method by which the law can be made supreme, and is the protector of the individual against despotic arbitrariness. Using the example of the Catholic Church, he pointed out that bureaucracy is only appropriate for an organization whose code of conduct is not subject to change. He then went on to argue that complaints about bureaucratization usually refer not to the criticism of the bureaucratic methods themselves, but to "the intrusion of bureaucracy into all spheres of human life." Mises saw bureaucratic processes at work in both the private and public spheres; however, he believed that bureaucratization in the private sphere could only occur as a consequence of government interference. According to him, "What must be realized is only that the strait jacket of bureaucratic organization paralyzes the individual's initiative, while within the capitalist market society an innovator still has a chance to succeed. The former makes for stagnation and preservation of inveterate methods, the latter makes for progress and improvement."

=== Robert K. Merton ===
American sociologist Robert K. Merton expanded on Weber's theories of bureaucracy in his work Social Theory and Social Structure, published in 1957. While Merton agreed with certain aspects of Weber's analysis, he also noted the dysfunctional aspects of bureaucracy, which he attributed to a "trained incapacity" resulting from "over conformity". He believed that bureaucrats are more likely to defend their own entrenched interests than to act to benefit the organization as a whole but that pride in their craft makes them resistant to changes in established routines. Merton stated that bureaucrats emphasize formality over interpersonal relationships, and have been trained to ignore the special circumstances of particular cases, causing them to come across as "arrogant" and "haughty".

=== Elliott Jaques ===
In his book A General Theory of Bureaucracy, first published in 1976, Elliott Jaques describes the discovery of a universal and uniform underlying structure of managerial or work levels in the bureaucratic hierarchy for any type of employment systems.

Jaques argues and presents evidence that for the bureaucracy to provide a valuable contribution to the open society some of the following conditions must be met:

- The number of levels in the hierarchy of a bureaucracy must match the complexity level of the employment system for which the bureaucratic hierarchy is created. (Jaques identified a maximum of eight levels of complexity for bureaucratic hierarchies.)
- Roles within a bureaucratic hierarchy differ in the level of work complexity.
- The level of work complexity in the roles must be matched by the level of human capability of the role holders. (Jaques identified maximum of eight levels of human capability.)
- The level of work complexity in any managerial role within a bureaucratic hierarchy must be one level higher than the level of work complexity of the subordinate roles.
- Any managerial role in a bureaucratic hierarchy must have full managerial accountabilities and authorities (veto selection to the team, decide task types and specific task assignments, decide personal effectiveness and recognition, decide initiation of removal from the team within due process).
- Lateral working accountabilities and authorities must be defined for all the roles in the hierarchy (seven types of lateral working accountabilities and authorities: collateral, advisory, service-getting and -giving, coordinative, monitoring, auditing, prescribing).

=== David Graeber ===
In his book Utopia of Rules, anthropologist David Graeber, argues that the critique of bureaucracy hasn't been updated since the 60's and 70's while at the same time bureaucracies have become more powerful. Graeber calls our time of public-private financialized bureaucracy for "the age of total bureaucratization".

== Bureaucracy and democracy ==
Constitutional values including democracy are arguments for opposition to democratic backsliding by bureaucracies. Democracies tend to be bureaucratic, with numerous civil servants and regulatory agencies with devolved power. On occasion a group might seize control of a bureaucratic state, as the Nazis did in Germany in the 1930s.

Although numerous ideals associated with democracy, such as equality, participation, and individuality, are in stark contrast to those associated with modern bureaucracy, specifically hierarchy, specialization, and impersonality, political theorists did not recognize bureaucracy as a threat to democracy. Yet, democratic theorists still have not developed an adequate response to the challenge posed by bureaucratic power within democratic governance.

One approach to addressing this issue rejects the idea that bureaucracy has any role at all in a true democracy. Theorists who adopt this perspective typically understand that they must demonstrate that bureaucracy does not necessarily occur in every contemporary society; only in those they perceive to be non-democratic. Thus, 19th century British writers frequently referred to bureaucracy as the "Continental nuisance," because their democracy was resistant to it, in their point of view.

According to Marx and other socialist thinkers, the most advanced bureaucracies were those in France and Germany. However, they argued that bureaucracy was a symptom of the bourgeois state and would vanish along with capitalism, which gave rise to the bourgeois state. Though clearly not the democracies Marx had in mind, socialist societies ended up being more bureaucratic than the governments they replaced. Similarly, after capitalist economies developed the administrative systems required to support their extensive welfare states, the idea that bureaucracy exclusively exists in socialist governments could scarcely be maintained.

== Administrative burden ==
Administrative burden refers to the costs and difficulties individuals experience when interacting with bureaucracy, particularly when navigating government agencies and accessing public services. These burdens are commonly classified into three categories: learning costs, associated with acquiring information about public programs and understanding eligibility requirements, compliance costs, involving the time, effort, and resources required to complete applications, provide documentation, and meet administrative requirements; and psychological costs, such as stress, stigma, frustration, and loss of autonomy. Administrative burdens can influence individuals' ability to access public services and benefits, and their effects may vary across social groups and according to individuals' resources and circumstances. Such burdens may also arise from the way administrative information is communicated and public services are designed. The increasing use of digital government interfaces has changed how citizens interact with bureaucracies, potentially reducing some administrative costs while creating barriers to finding, understanding, and using information. The concept provides a perspective for examining how bureaucratic procedures and institutional arrangements shape citizens' experiences of government and access to public services.

== See also ==
- Adhocracy – Organization type characterized by minimal structure
- Anarchy – Society without rulers
- Franz Kafka – Austrian and Czech writer (1883–1924)
- Machinery of government – Interconnected structures and processes of government
- Michel Crozier – French sociologist (1922–2013)
- Outline of organizational theory – Overview of concepts related to organizational theory
- Power (social and political) – Ability to influence the behaviour of others
- Red tape – Idiom for excessively bureaucratic procedures or regulations
- Requisite organization
- Technocracy – Form of government run by experts
