= Economy of the Asante Empire =

The Economy of the Asante Empire was largely a pre-industrial and agrarian economy. Gold dust was the legal tender of Asante since the 18th century while kakraas served as a small denomination currency. Creditors were available to give loans with interest. The Asante mobilized state revenue from measures ranging from death duties to court fees. The state could also control public funds effectively. Tributary states paid annual goods to the empire while European merchants at the coast paid tribute through notes.

Asante trade extended upon two main trade routes; one at the North and the other at the South. The northern trade route was dominated by the trade in Kola nuts and at the south, the Asante engaged in the Atlantic Slave Trade where they sold items like gold and slaves in exchange for firearms. The Asante invested more in the northern trade since the early 19th century. A variety of economic industries such as cloth-weaving and metal working industries existed. The Asante originally farmed in subsistence until agriculture became extensive during the 19th century.

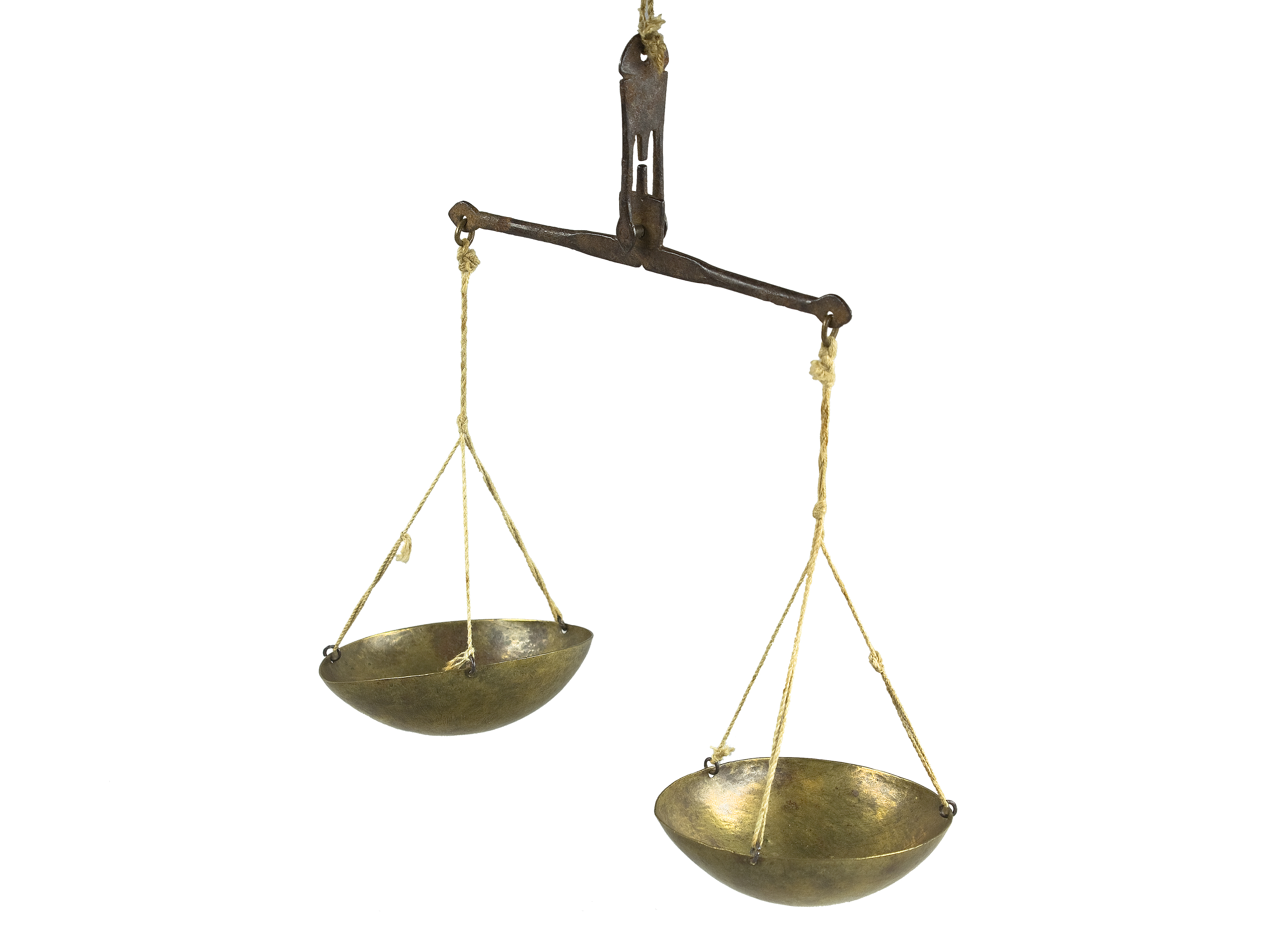
An Akan weighing scale

== Finanace ==
=== Currency ===
Gold dust was the main currency of the Asante Empire. The peredwan (also known as peregwan or pereguine) was the highest denomination in Asante. It was equal to 2$\textstyle\frac{1}{4}$ troy ounces. The use of gold dust as an official currency emerged during the reign of Osei Kofi Tutu I in the early 18th century. Gold nuggets and ingots were not considered currency and any found within the state were required to be sent to the treasury. The Asante had 13 defined units of weights equal to British coins ranging from 3S to £24.

Cowries were banned in Asante therefore, merchants could trade with cowries only at the coast and in the savannah areas. Gold dust was limited in supply and in response, the Asante goldsmiths minted a coin-like object called kakraa made up of gold mixed with copper or silver. These kakraas were used as a small denomination currency. The currency was generally worth half a farthing and one kakraa was equal to two cowries. Kakraas predated the Asante and it was used by predecessor Akan kingdoms in the region, who were absorbed into the empire. The Asante did not stamp these coin-like kakraas. The Asante were also familiar with gold mithqals. Joseph Dupuis wrote in the early 19th century, that mithquals were accepted in Asante and thirteen mithqals were equal to two ounces of pure gold.

=== Credit ===
In 1817, the interest rate on loans was 33$\textstyle\frac{1}{3}$ percent every 40 days. Interest-bearing loans called kotobrani were used to finance trading expeditions to the coast. The Asantehene himself could give loans to officials. Loans given by the Asantehene were payable after two or three years and the official was expected to make fortune within that period before repayment. In the early 19th century, Bowdich wrote that such loans were mostly applied to trade and if the functional failed to convince the Asantehene during repayment then "his talent is thought too mean for further elevation."

Rattray notes how creditors could turn to the aid of chiefs when a borrower failed to pay. The chief sent their treasurer to accompany the creditor and they coerced the debtor to pay. Some creditors paid their chief in order to receive the authority that enabled them to enforce debt payment. Beyond the state, creditors also called upon the gods to kill debtors. Panyarring was another method for debt repayment until a ban by Asantehene Kwaku Dua I around 1838. But the practice resurfaced after the overthrow of Mensa Bonsu in 1883. Beside pawns, land and assets could be placed under mortgage (awowa).

== State revenues ==
According to Ratray, the Omanhene obtained revenue through death duties, trade, court fees and fines as well as mining. The Gyaasewahene was responsible for the empire's national treasury. The collection of revenue was decentralized. All Paramount Chiefs and Sub-Chiefs possessed a local treasury in their jurisdiction which was managed under the auspices of the Sanaahene, the Royal Treasurer. It was the local treasury that the chiefs contained their revenue into. Death dues were paid by the family of the deceased. The value of the deceased's estate was assessed but scholars such as Kwame Afosa have asserted that the amount to be paid was left to the discretion of the relatives of the deceased.

Court fees known as Aseda were paid by the innocent party during a court case to the officials who constituted the court. Court fees were divided in predetermined proportions among members of the tribunal present at the court as well as the divisional chiefs and the attendants of the palace. Fines inflicted upon guilty litigants were paid into the treasury of the Chief. In the court of the Asantehene, penalties attached to oaths which were paid by defaulters after court proceedings amounted to as much as 101.25 Peredwan (£810). Atitodie which means "head price" was a fine paid by individuals pronounced liable to death sentence. The price could amount to £800. Revenue was also acquired from gold mining. One third of the proceeds went to the tenant on whose land the mines were worked upon. The remainder was given to the chief and sub chief who presided over the region.

The Asante had an effective system of accounting to control public funds. The state treasury was made up of two boxes known as Adaka Kesie (Big Box) and Apim Adaka (Box of thousand) in separate rooms. The treasury system of Asante was similar to the Imprest system. Historian Afosa, likens the Adaka Kesie to a Current Account and the Apim Adaka to a Petty Cash account. Adaka Kesie was partitioned into three compartments and according to Kwame Afosa, "All three partitions contained gold dust each for the value of one Peregwan (£8). Nothing less than a Peregwan was deposited into the box and nothing less than that was taken out. The Apim Adaka served as the source of government expenditure. Whenever a Peregwan (£8) was withdrawn from the Adaka Kesie, it was placed into the Apim Adaka. The money in the Apim Adaka was weighed in small packets in order to be used for purchases. The Royal Treasurer was assisted by three officials during financial transactions with the boxes. Paying into or taking out of the boxes were recorded in cowries and witnessed by three persons other than the Royal Treasurer.

In the early 19th century, 400,000 oz of gold dust at a value of £1.5 million at that time, was required to keep the Adaka Kesie full. The keys to the Adaka Kesie were kept under the care of the chief, the Sanaahene, and the chief of the "bed-chamber," known as Daberehene. War taxes known as apeatoo were paid by adult men and women over the age of 18. War taxes were based on the expenditure on guns and ammunition and they were shared among the divisions, sub-divisions, villages and lineages of the empire. These war taxes were used to meet war expenses.

=== Tributary States ===
According to Bowdich, the Asante had not less than 21 tributary states by 1819. They included Gyaaman, Takyiman, Dagbon, Gonja and Denkyira. The annual tribute was paid in gold, slaves, cattle, poultry, and native manufactured cloth. Failure to pay tribute was equivalent to a rebellion. Conquered states at the Coast under Asante jurisdiction were responsible for collecting Notes from European traders at trading posts. These Notes which were received by the chiefs of the coastal states were given to the Asante as tributes. Before the Fanti war of 1807, the Asante king held Notes on three Accra forts which had been captured from the Akim in 1730, on Axim fort, and also on the Elmina Castle. A total sum of ten ounces a year was derived as tribute in the form of notes. The amount could also be paid in goods such as firearms. The possession of Notes enabled the king of Asante, on occasion, to secure credit for muskets and ammunition.

== Trade ==
=== Markets ===
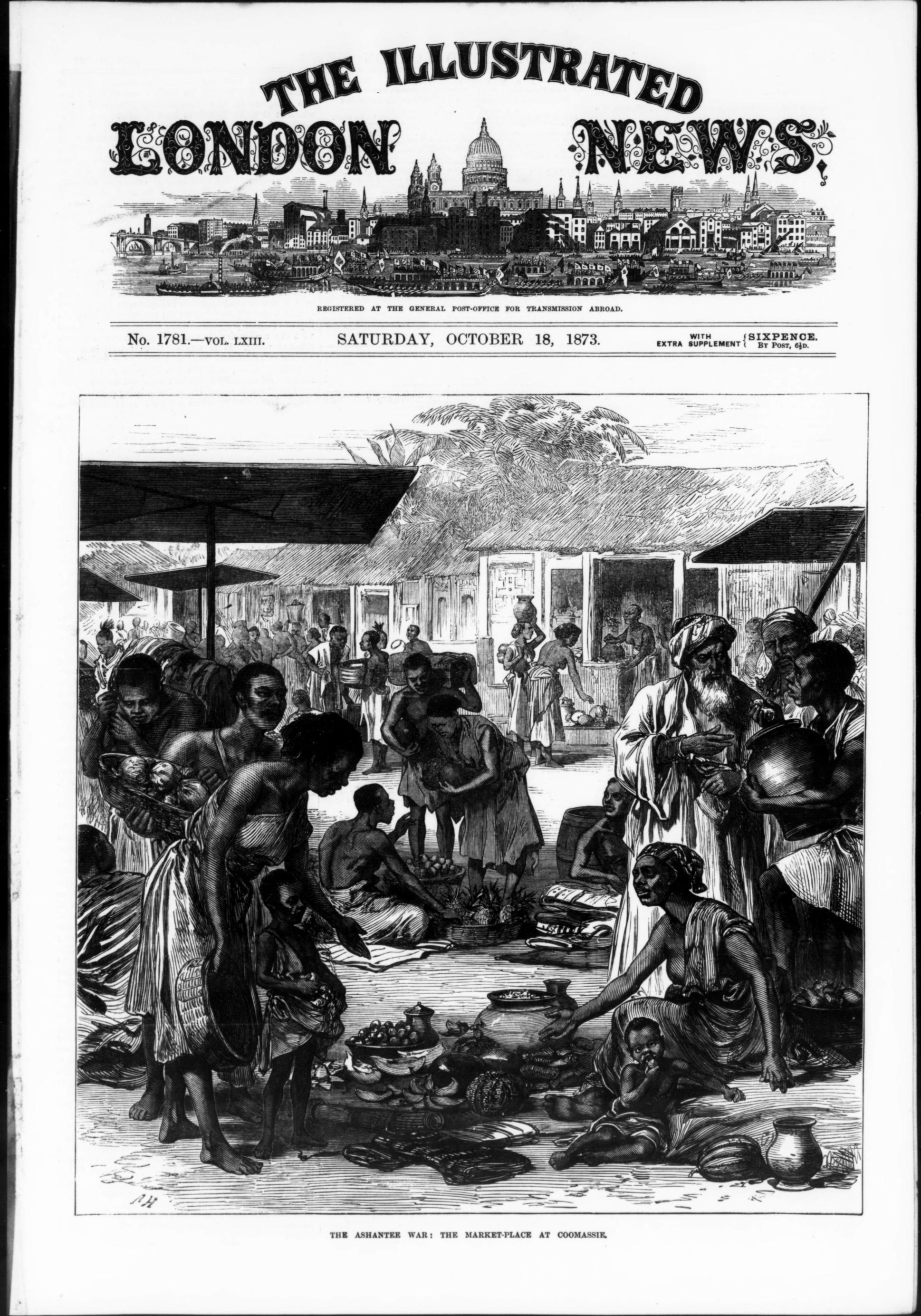
Marketplace at Kumasi from The Illustrated London News in 1873.

In the early 19th century, markets became essential in Asante economy. Markets were held daily from eight o'clock in the morning until sunset. Bowdich pointed out that these markets had about sixty stalls and sheds. Foreign imports into these markets included pillows, pipes, tobacco and brassware. There was the presence of internal marketing and retailing. Marketing and retailing were done by both men and women. Market sellers were taxed by toll collectors. Historian Arhin describes three types of markets that existed in Asante. These were local, district and regional markets. Local markets served places like the capital, Kumasi. District markets were situated at boundary towns, industrial areas or military depots. And regional markets were located on the outskirts of the state such as Salaga and Bonduku.

=== Traders ===
Long-distance trading was carried out by occasional, professional and state-funded traders. Traders of Asante gold and slaves were taxed at the borders of the empire. Domestic and internal trade was carried out by the dwadifo traders while foreign trade was organized by traders called the batadifo.

==== State Traders ====
The Asante had a Company of State Traders for commerce called the Bata Fekuo, which was formed in the 18th century during the reign of Osei Kwadwo. It evolved from the Asokwa people who had joined Asante under Osei Tutu I. The company was financed by the Gyaasewahene and treasury. Financial management of the company was carried out by trade chiefs or mercantile agents who received loan capital from the treasury. The trade chiefs obtained porters from the asokwafo commissariat based in Kumasi. According to historian Ivor Wilks, "a very considerable part" of the Asante gross national product came from the company's operations throughout the 19th century.

=== Trade routes ===
The main Asante trade routes were located at the North and South. The northern trade routes involved trade contacts with forest savannah fringes of the Brong districts in modern Ghana, east-central and northern Ivory Coast, Upper Volta and Dahomey. The southern trade route was established at the coast. At the market towns on the northern trade routes, the Asante merchants exchanged kola nuts for salt and European goods for shea butter, livestock, cotton silk threads and cloths, metal locks, gold and slaves. Under Osei Kofi Tutu I, the Asante established commercial relations with European merchants at the coast following the victory over Denkyira in 1701. In the southern trade routes, the Asante sold gold, ivory, slaves and rubber in exchange for firearms, lead bars, gunpowder, drinks and salt. Asante rulers commanded the bulk of the trade with Europeans at the coast. Commoners still took part in the trade with Europeans as noted by Scholar K.Y. Daaku. Asante Commoners traded primarily in rubber at the coast. The northern trade saw participation by all individuals and families irrespective of their social status. Historian Arhin mentions the northern trade "as more productive of wealth" with "more general participation."

After the early 19th century ban on the Atlantic Slave Trade south, the Asante invested more into the northern trade. Dalrymple-Smith adds that the Asante invested in the northern trade before 1808. Historian Austin writes that Asante's main exports in the 19th century were kola nuts to the north, and gold at the south. Rubber replaced gold as the major export south in the last two decades of the century. In the 19th century, Asante fostered trade with the Sokoto Caliphate through kola exports of which historian Lovejoy estimated Sokoto to have imported around 70–140 metric tons annually in the early 19th century and 250–350 metric tons by the end of the century. In addition, Asante exported gold, European weapons and goods to Sokoto while importing animals such as horses, donkeys and sheep as well as textiles. From the 1830s and until the late 19th century, the Asante government restricted and confined Hausa traders to Salaga as well as markets north of the Volta.

=== Slave trade ===
Trade in slaves was a major tradition in pre-colonial Asante culture. Slaves were typically taken as captives from enemies in warfare. Perbi states that the Asante Empire was the largest slave-owning state in the territory of modern Ghana during the Atlantic slave trade. During the reign of Asantehene Osei Kwame Panyin (1777–1803), the sale of Asante citizens into slavery was banned. Wilks argues that the economy of Asante "was not one based upon slave-raiding for export purposes". He cites Asantehene Osei Bonsu's speech to Dupuis in 1820;

I cannot make war to catch slaves in the bush, like a thief. My ancestors never did so. But if I fight a king and kill him when he is insolent, then certainly I must have his gold, and his slaves, and the people are mine too. Do not White kings act like this?

— Osei Bonsu.

He also references Brodie Cruickshank, who wrote in 1853 that "The Ashantee wars are never undertaken expressly to supply this demand." Wilks writes that slaves were more important to the Asante economy in the form of domestic labor in the agricultural and industrial sector than for export in the Atlantic slave trade. Some historians such as Reid and Dalrymple-Smith have commented that the Asante economy did not depend on the Atlantic slave trade. Stilwell states that the Asante rulers traded in slaves but "also sought other economic options."

== Industry ==
Certain villages were specialized in a particular craft. It was common for the Asante government to settle war captives with craft skills in such villages. The village of Bonwire was specialized in cloth-weaving. Ntonso was specialized in cloth-dyeing, Pankrono in pottery, Ahwiaa in wood working, Breman and Adum in goldsmithing and metalworking. All these villages and settlement were located 15 miles of Kumasi. Blacksmiths, joinery and pottery makers were located throughout the empire.

=== Mining ===
Mining was both an individual and communal chore. Individuals along with children partook in gold panning and shaft mining while slaves formed the major labor force on gold mines. Much of the state's gold originated from mines although some gold could be obtained by panning in streams. Deep shafts were common and such mines could reach 100 feet deep. They were connected by tunnels "several hundred feet in length." An example given by historian Edgerton is a mine that had a timber-shored tunnel 300 yards long and contained galleries where the gold was worked. Miners had to dig or chop Feldspar and granite in the mines but gunpowder could be used as explosives to blast hard rock. The ore obtained was transported to crushing areas where they were crushed by hammers on stone slabs and the remains were milled. The powder obtained from the milling process was washed in order to extract the gold from the powder.

== Agriculture ==
From the 17th century, the Asante economy revolved around the rural production of staple crops which was supplemented by hunting. Asante agriculture was in a subsistence form during this time period. Throughout history, the Asante used the axe, cutlass, billhook and hoe for clearing and maintaining the land. Asante farmers practiced both land and crop rotation. The basic Asante farm was made up of the land containing the crops and the non-farm land under fallow. From the 19th century, agriculture became intensified and extensive especially in and around Kumasi. According to Bowdich in 1817, crops around Esereso near Kumasi, were planted in triangular beds with small drains around each. Both Bowdich and Dupuis noted the existence of large fenced yam fields which were planted in rectangular lines. Huttonn who accompanied Dupuis in 1820, stated that several plantations near Kumasi were enclosed. Some cleared grounds covered as much as 2 acres. These lands were laid out in small beds which were not "dissimilar, or much inferior, to the country gardens in Europe."

Certain farms such as Kola plantations were established with the exclusive aim of generating revenue for into the chief's treasury. These types of farms were known as Stool plantations. Crops that were cultivated in the empire included plantains, yams, manioc, corn, peanuts and tomatoes. In addition, animal husbandry was prominent as pig farming and other livestock were reared in the 19th century. Bowdich documents the use of a fishing weir by settlements about 60 miles southwest of Kumasi.
