= Kusi Obodom =

Third Asantehene of the Ashanti Empire

- Asantehene
- Reign: c. 1750 – 1764
- Predecessor: Opoku Ware I
- Successor: Osei Kwadwo

Kusi Obodom was the 3rd Asantehene of the Ashanti Empire from 1750 to 1764. He was elected as the successor to Opoku Ware I as opposed to the nominee suggested by Opoku Ware I. Obodom's reign was inaugurated with a civil war in response to his election until stability ensued by 1751.

Domestically, Obodom's administration instituted legal reforms such as the restoration of the full constitutional powers of the chiefs that had been limited by his predecessor. In foreign policy, the Asantehene sought to subdue the alliance made up of rebel provincial states and other groups that halted Ashanti dominance towards the Coast. At the latter part of his reign, the alliance disintegrated and Ashanti was able to bring down its influence. In 1764, Dahomey and the Oyo Empire supported the Akyem as well as other rebel subject states. Kusi Obodom's pursuit of the rebels brought Ashanti into conflict with Dahomey and Oyo through which the Ashanti army was defeated at the Battle of Atakpamé. Kusi Obodom's growing unpopularity, along with his failing health, led to his removal from office in 1764 and the election of Osei Kwadwo as Asantehene.

== Background ==
He ruled during the Oyoko Abohyen dynasty. He was the grandnephew of Osei Kofi Tutu I, who had been king of Ashanti in 1701. Kusi Obodom's mother, Nkaatia Ntim Abamo, was the second Asantehemaa. Kusi Obodom became Asantehene after debate - and occasional violence - over the Golden Stool. He succeeded Opoku Ware I. Before the death Opoku Ware I, the Asantehene requested Darko as his successor. Upon the death of Asantehene Opoku Ware, the kingmakers ignored the request and elected Kusi Obodom instead. This plunged the state into civil war as reported by the Danes at the Coast in May 1750. By 1751, letters from the Christiansborg Castle stated that Darko had committed suicide with his followers and faction executed as Kusi Obodom was now affirmed as Asantehene. In March 1755, Governor Thomas Melvil reported from the Cape Coast Castle about a civil war in Ashanti. This implied the presence of civil disobedience in the early reign of Kusi Obodom.

== Reign ==
=== Domestic affairs ===
Kusi Obodom banned the practice of human sacrifice during his reign. Although sacrifices would continue in Ashanti after his era. The King restored the "full constitutional powers" of the chiefs which had been limited by the previous Asantehene, Opoku Ware I. In addition, Kusi introduced the policy of atitodee, which was a fine paid by individuals charged with a death sentence. Reindorf states it was Kusi who formed the Akwanmofo to monitor the roads of the Ashanti Empire. He writes that the King "ordered inspectors to be appointed for cleaning roads and paths of the kingdom of nuisances." In 1751, King Kofi Sono of Gyaman concluded a peace settlement with Kusi Obodom's representatives with Dutch messengers from Elmina as witnesses. Wilks mentions that although these settlements do not survive, they were the legal mandates for the annexation of Gyaman, and other states such as Kpembe (Northern Region), into the Ashanti Empire.

=== Foreign affairs ===
==== The Alliance ====
From the early to mid 18th centuries, the Ashanti had engaged in expansionism under Opoku Ware. In the 1740s, the Ashanti had expanded across the majority of the coast of Ghana, excluding the Fante. Between 1746 and 1749, the provincial states of Akyem, Wassa, Denkyira and Twifo had formed an alliance with the Fante to oppose the Ashanti. This alliance aimed to halt Ashanti expansion to the coast, to cement their status as middlemen in trade from the coast with the Inland and block Ashanti's direct access to European trade and firearms. The Fante initiated peacemaking efforts between the alliance and Ashanti starting in 1753. The British at the coast led by Governor Thomas Melvil aided Fante's efforts at mediation after request for support from the Fante. From 1754 - 1758, the Dutch also negotiated peace talks with Ashanti and the provinces. In 1758, the allied states met Asantehene Kusi Obodom at Kumasi to commence the mediation process while the Dutch served as mediators. Obodom considered replacing military representatives with civilian rule in these provincial states. 2000 oz of gold was paid to Ashanti by the members of the alliance.

Kusi Obodom proposed four or five conditions during the negotiation process. For instance, he demanded the alliance halted antagonism against Ashanti southern provinces such as Kwahu and Sefwi. Parts of Akyem and Aowin had fallen under Ashanti protection. The King also demanded the alliance unblocked the roads leading to the coast. Negotiations broke down and the members of the alliance prepared for war against the Ashanti Empire with the exception of the Fante. The Fante - Ashanti trade was negatively affected by the blockade of the Ashanti from the coast and this was a factor for Fante advocacy for mediation. The Fante withdrew support for the alliance by 1758 and 1759. Around 1759 and 1760, the Fante and Ashanti formed an agreement to attack the members of the alliance. Within this period, Denkyira King Owusu Beri exited from the alliance and formed cooperative relations with Ashanti. This sparked a planned attack by the other members of the alliance on Denkyira but Owusu Beri prevented this by attacking the allied camp first. After gaining victory, Owusu Beri signed a peace treaty with the Ashanti promising support against the Wassa, Akyem and Twifo who formed the remaining members of the alliance.

==== Battle of Atakpamé and destoolment ====
Around 1764, the Akyem sought aid from the Oyo Empire. Dahomey and Oyo assisted rebel forces such as Kwahu and Akyem to secede. In 1820, Joseph Dupuis was informed in Ashanti that, under Asantehene Kusi Obodom "the caboceers of Bouromy, Quahou and Akim were instigated to take up arms by the intrigues of the court of Dahomey whose monarch received them into pay, and promised to support them with an army for the restoration of their original government." According to scholar Fynn, Kusi engaged an attack on the Akyem and their allies after getting informed of an Oyo intervention. The deployed Ashanti army defeated the rebels successfully but they escaped east past the Volta. Wilks adds that Kusi crossed the Volta in hunt of the rebels although this was against the advice of his councilors. In early 1764, the Ashanti and Dahomey forces fought an inconclusive battle. As the Ashanti army withdrew, it engaged in battle against Dahomey and Oyo but was forced to retreat with heavy casualties. Following the defeat, Kusi Obodom was removed out of office and he was succeeded by Asantehene Osei Kwadwo in 1764.

== Death ==
The King grew unpopular by the latter part of his reign. Bantamahene Adu Gyamera, led a campaign to remove him out of office. The King abdicated willingly from the throne in 1764 after experiencing visual impairment. He was replaced by Osei Kwadwo as the new Asantehene. Kusi Obodom spent the rest of his life at Akyeramade near Kumasi where he died that year in 1764. After his death, his body was not placed in the Bantama royal mausoleum.
