= Roads of the Asante Empire =

Road network in the Asante Empire

8 roads with several sub routes were built by the Asante Empire to connect the capital with cities north and south of the empire starting from the 18th century. Asante roads were supervised and policed by the government, but the sacred roads of the state received more attention. 4 main roads were directed northwards of the state whiles the other 4 were built south and towards the Coast. The southern roads of the Asante Empire fell into decline in the late 19th century and the entire road network was abandoned following British colonization.

== Background ==
Between the 18th and 19th centuries, the Asante Empire built and maintained a system of eight roads that emanated from the capital, Kumasi, up to the frontiers of the state. The roads were referred to as Nkwantempon (Great Roads) by the Asante. The Southern roads linked the capital with the series of coastal ports between the Volta and Komoé rivers. The Northern roads led to towns such as Bondoukou, Daboya and Yendi on the frontiers of Greater Asante where they joined with the Trans-Saharan trade routes in the North. The central government maintained the major roads while the district authorities oversaw the sub and local roads. As noted by Wilks, Larry Yarak suggested in 1990 that Asante's roads from Kumase "to Axim via Denkyera, Wasa and Aowin, and from Kumase to Elmina via Denkyera and Twifo were already in use in the first decade of the eighteenth century."

Each of the Great Roads bore a name. They could be named after the ruler who constructed it or the province to which it led to. Halting places were built along the roads to serve as lodges for travelers. These also served as an infrastructure of law enforcement to attend to cases of banditry reported on the roads. Some of these halting places were large as towns whiles others were recorded to contain just a few sheds. Special roads such as the sacred road between Kumasi and Bantama received constant attention and supervision. They were surfaced with stone, weeded regularly and trees lined the roads for shade.

In the early 19th century, bridges were made of unhewn trees with rope handrails that stretched from one end of the river to the other. During the reign of Kwaku Dua I around 1841, proper bridges were constructed which Thomas Birch Freeman described the process as:

Some stout, forked sticks or posts are driven in the centre of the stream at convenient distances, across which are placed some strong beams, fastened to the posts with withes, from the numerous climbing plants on every hand. On these bearers are placed long stout poles which are covered with earth from fourth to six inches thick....

— Freeman.

To construct a road, negotiations had to be drawn first between the government and the chiefs whose land the project would take place. Road wardens known as Nkwansrafo served as the highway police of these roads and in addition, they collected tolls. An Nkwansrafo station was documented at Mamfe in 1788 and at Ahenkro in 1882 for example. The Akwanmofo was the institution responsible for maintaining Asante roads. Reindorf states that the institution was first created by Asantehene Kusi Obodom (1750–1764) who "ordered inspectors to be appointed for cleaning roads and paths of the kingdom of nuisances." Asantehene Osei Kwadwo (1764–1777) created the Akwanmofohene office which translates as "Chief inspector of nuisances and path cleaners." The Akwanmofo was mandated by the central government to make payments to workers hired by the institution for clearing the roads. Thornton comments that the Great Roads improved Asante warfare as it allowed for the rapid deployment of the Asante army.

== Routes ==
=== Great Roads of the north ===
There were four great roads or routes that lead from Kumasi towards northern Ghana. The 1st road linked Kumasi with Bondoukou in the province of Gyaman. The 2nd route emanated from Kumasi and it was exhausted at Gonja. The 3rd route linked Kumasi with the central Gonja provinces of Guipe and Daboya. The 3rd route linked up with a trade route that led to Djenné. The 4th route linked Kumasi with Salaga, Kpembe in Eastern Gonja as well as Yendi. Roads proceeded from Salaga and Yendi towards Zabzugu and at Zabzugu, they merged with caravan routes towards central Sudan. A major branch of the 4th Great Road called Route IV (a) by historian Wilks, led to Kete Krachi from Atebubu according to Bowdich in the early 19th century. Joseph Dupuis wrote in 1824 that this route was the most preferred for transport between Kumasi and Abomey.

=== Great Roads of the south ===
The 5th road went southeast from Kumasi to Accra. Minor branches of the road led east of Accra to the towns of Ningo, Prampram and Adah. Other minor roads of the 5th route went westward of Accra to Senya Beraku and Winneba. A major branch of the 5th Great Road referred to as Route V (a) by historian Wilks, passed through Kwawu and near the Volta at Edzebeni. From Edzebeni, the road advanced south through the Volta gorge to Akwamu. At Akwamu, sub routes progressed to Dahomey and the Anlo along the Lower Volta. In between the 4th and 5th routes was a road originating from Kumasi through Bonwire, Dwaben, Asokore and Mohoo at Kumawu.

The 6th Great Road originated from Kumasi up to Anomabu. In the early 19th century, halting places located across this road included Eduabin (Ashanti Region), Akrofuom, Praso and Dunkwa. A branch of Route 6 directed eastwards and further South near Foso through Nsaba, Swedru and Winneba. A sub route also ran from Dunkwa where it ended at Mouri. The 7th Great Road originated from Kumasi and led further South to Elmina. Some of the towns the 7th road passed through before Elmina were Eduabin, Bekwae, and Dumama. The 7th route spawned minor roads that led to Komenda and Shama. Another sub road ran towards Takoradi and Axim. In 1816, Osei Bonsu commenced reconstruction of the 6th and 7th routes at a standard width of 30–40 feet and they were further straightened and weeded. Wilks writes that only the 7th route saw completion whiles the 6th Great Road was possibly delayed until 1820.

The initial part of the 8th road was first described by Bowdich around 1819, where he documented that it passed from Kumasi to Dako, Trebuom (Western Region) and Manso Nkwanta. Wilks adds that the road extended further south to the town of Saraha. A minor route branched from the 8th Great Road at Manso Nkwanta to Abankeseso. At Saraha, two sub roads separated from the 8th route East and West of the Tano River. By 1850, southern roads that connected Kumasi with the Coast includes the "Aowin road" which progressed from Kumasi through Ahanta to the Ivory Coast. Another route during this period that Scholar Dickson recounts is a route that ran "North-east from Kumasi through Juaben, and then south-east through Akim, Akwapim, and finally to Accra".

Throughout the late 19th century some of the Southern Great Roads fell into ruin after the Asante lost control of essential territories along such roads to the British Gold Coast. According to Wilks, some Great Roads such as the 6th route exists today as modern motor roads. He states “the modern motor road follows the old great-road for virtually the whole of its course.” The Great Roads in the North were still used throughout the 19th century but by the end of the century, the Great Roads fell into disuse after the Asante Empire and its territories were absorbed into the British, French and German Empires.
