= Emblem of His Majesty the King of Ashanti =

National emblem of the Asante nation

Emblem of His Majesty the Emperor of Ashanti
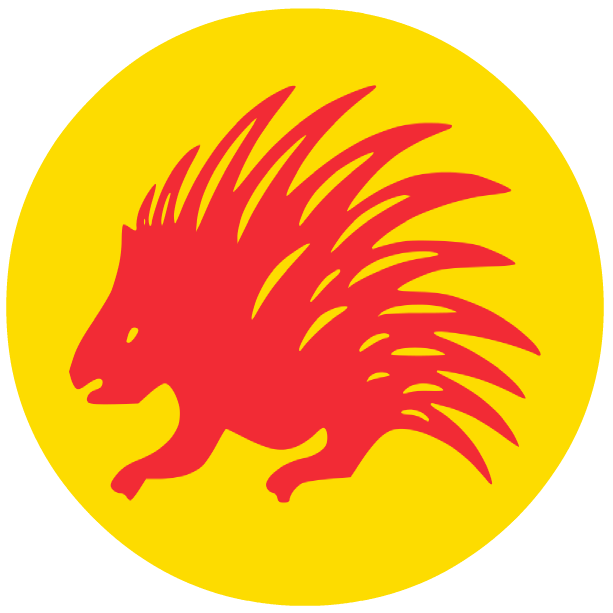
- Armiger: Asante Empire
- Adopted: December 30, 1701
- Shield: Red porcupine displaying its quills in a warning manner
- Motto: "Kum apem a, apem beba" (Kill a thousand, a thousand will come)

The Emblem of His Majesty the King of the Asante is the national emblem of the Asante nation, adopted by the Asante King Asantehene Osei Tutu I in 1701, and depicts a porcupine, which has been the Asante national animal since the early-eighteenth century AD.

== Emblem origin ==
The porcupine, as the Asante national emblem has been used by the Asantehene, the king of the Asante people, since 1701. The porcupine is the designated national animal of the Asante . The national emblem was created by Asantehene Nana Osei Kofi Tutu I (r. 1695–1717).

== Emblem description ==
The Asante national emblem is a red porcupine (or in Asante: Kotoko) on a gold background that symbolizes gold which has been a source of Asante wealth. The porcupine has been the designated national animal of the Asante since 1701 right through to the 21st century and stems from the Asante proverb:"The porcupine fights from all angles" and the readiness of the Asante nation to wage war on its enemies with the motto "Kum apem a, apem beba" (Kill a thousand, a thousand will rise) in reference to the porcupine's quills as symbols of Asante warriors, is still quoted.

== See also ==
- Political systems of the Asante Empire
