= Bremang =

- Urban area
- Location within Ghana
- Country: Ghana
- Region: Ashanti Region
- District: Kumasi Metropolitan District
- Time zone: GMT
  - Summer (DST): GMT

Bremang is a town in Kumasi Metropolitan District in the Ashanti Region of Ghana near the regional capital Kumasi.

== History ==
A policy of the Asante Empire was to resettle some of the population of an occupied territory across their loyal regions. In October 1817, Fante refugee families were resettled in Bremang to build a new village. As part of a new town plan in 1817, Asantehene Osei Bonsu had labourers construct a wide and straight street from Kumasi to Bremang which was the location of his country seat. In 1883, Asante was drawn into a constitutional crisis where Bremang and Kumasi served as the seat of two rulers elected as Asantehene by opposing state institutions. The Asantemanhyiamu elected former Asantehene Kofi Kakari in Bremang while the Inner Council chose Kwaku Dua Kuma in Kumasi.
