= Akyaawa Yikwan =

Ashanti Empire chief negotiator

Akyaawa Yikwan was a royalty from the Ashanti Empire who served as chief negotiator of the 1831 Anglo-Asante peace treaty.

== Background ==
Akyaawa Yikwan was the daughter of Asantehene Osei Kwadwo. Her mother was a customary wife to the Asantehene. The Ashanti collected taxes from castles and forts along the coastal belt of Ghana. After the loss of the battle of Akatamanso between the southern states and Ashanti that saw the liberation of the Ga-Adangme and the rest of the southern states from the Ashanti, and the renunciation of Ashanti lordship over their lands, Akyaawa Yikwan who was described as "a woman of masculine spirit" was arrested and traded to the Danes. Two of her brothers were killed in the war and her son in-law Oti Payin was beheaded.

== Peace treaty ==
The Council of Merchants in Accra that included the British felt that they could use the position of Akyaawa Yikwan to open up communication and trade opportunities with Kumasi. Akyaawa Yikwan was bought by the British and released in 1831 as an emissary to Ashanti in an attempt to open up trade routes between the two parties.
