= Small packet =

Type of shipping package

Small packet, also called packages, is a postal term that is internationally defined as mails less than 2 kg. Commonly, small items that are not flat enough to be sent as ordinary letter would be sent as small packets.

== Gallery ==
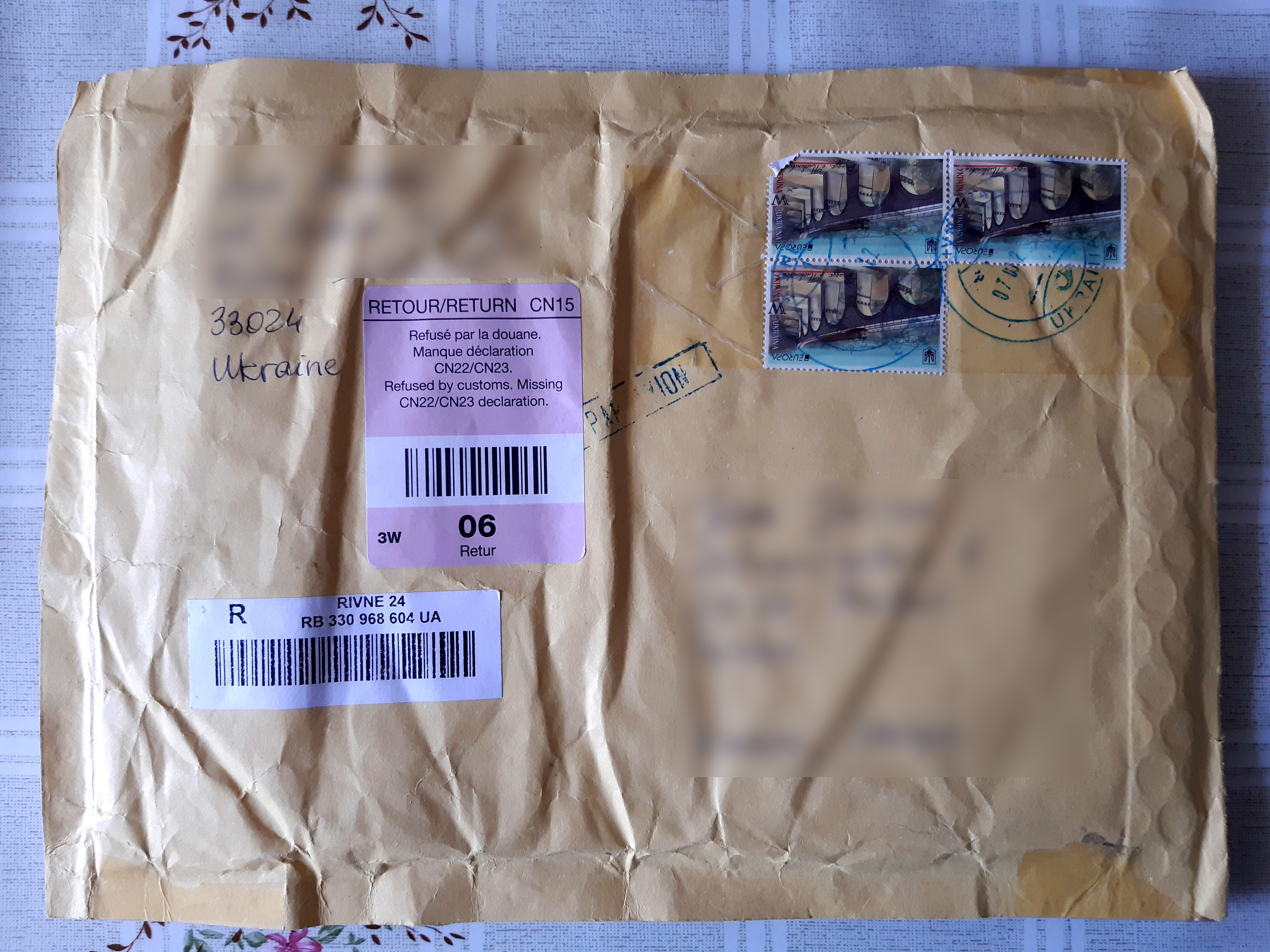
Small packets sent from Ukraine

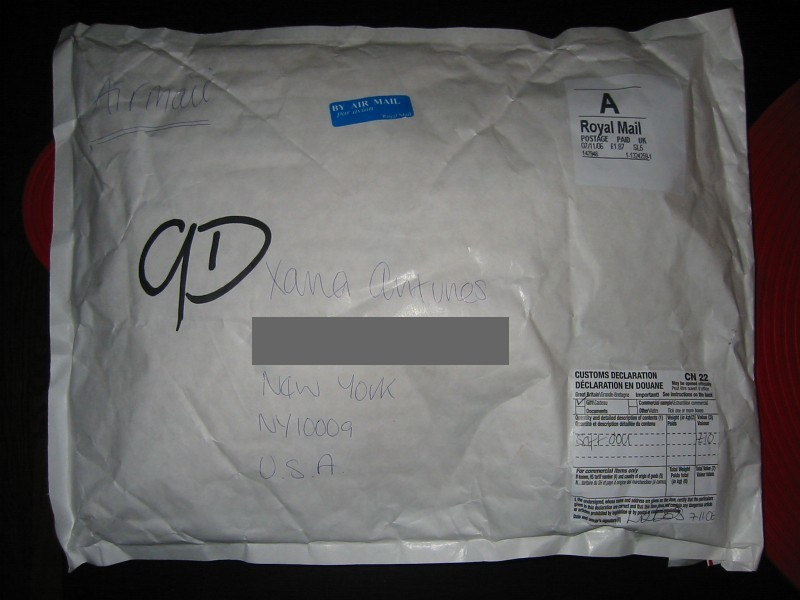
Small packets sent from the UK

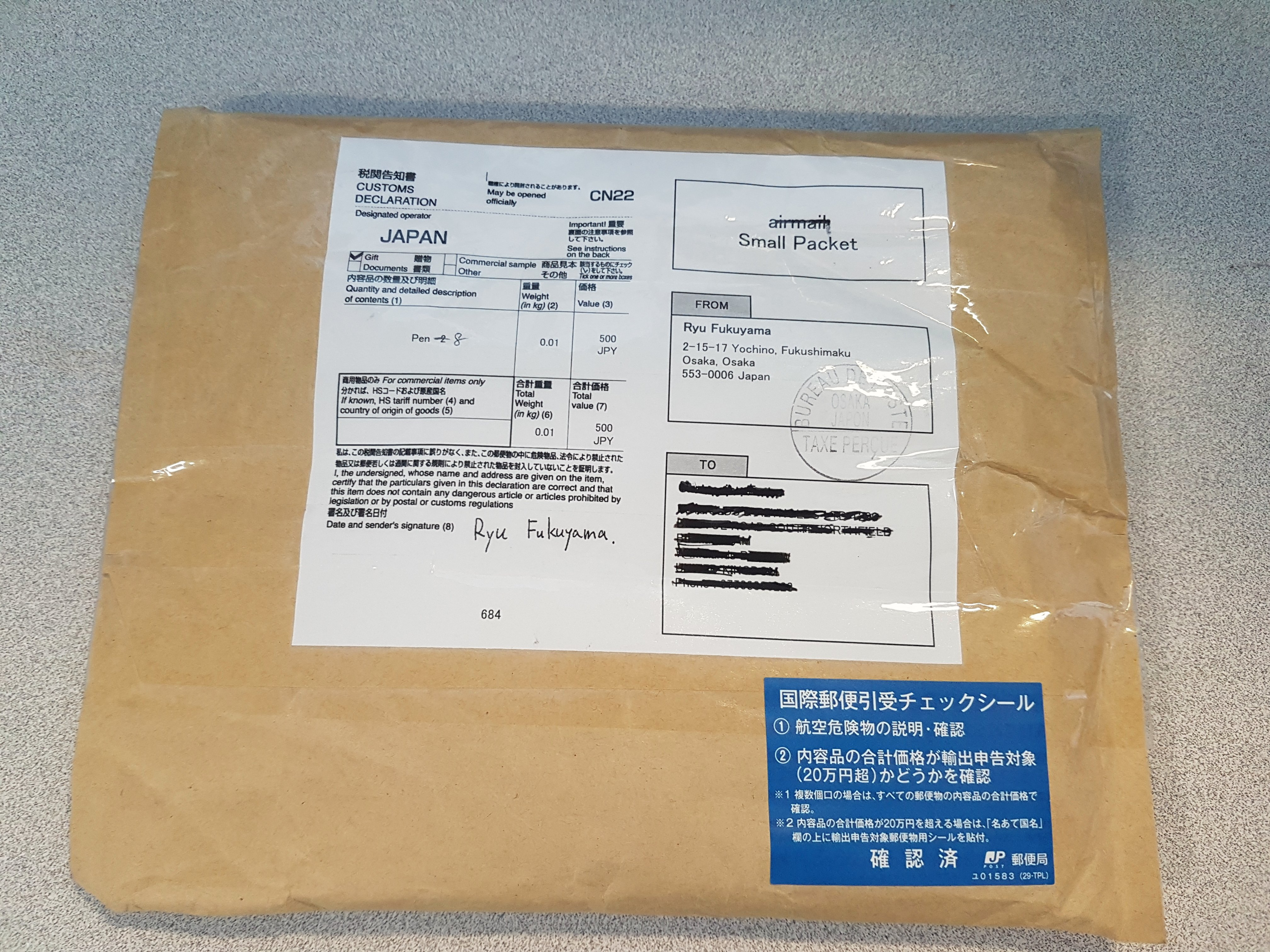
A Japan mail labeled as "small packets"
