= Adum =

Suburb of Kumasi, Ghana

Coordinates: 6.6919°N 1.6287°W

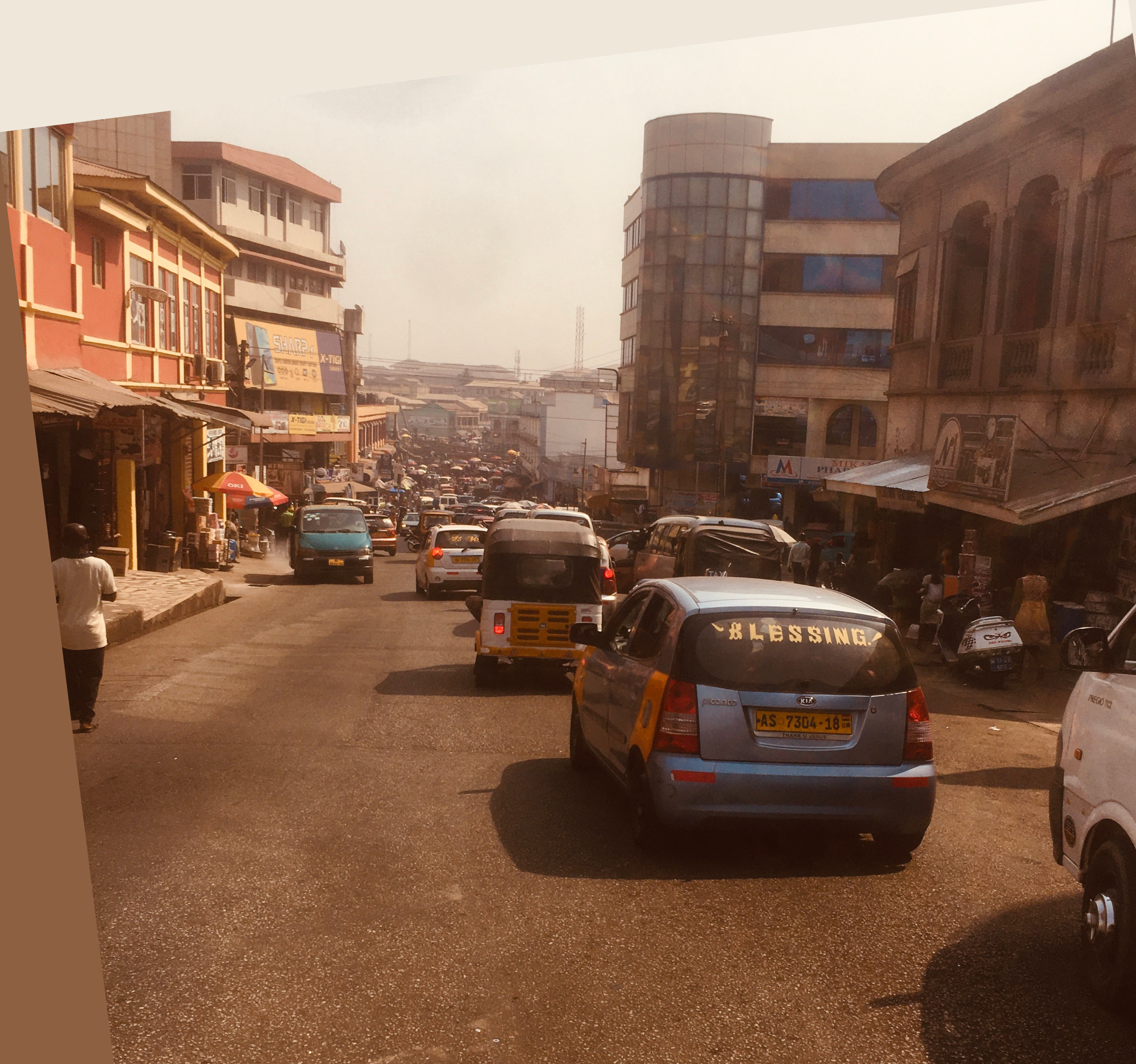
Adum

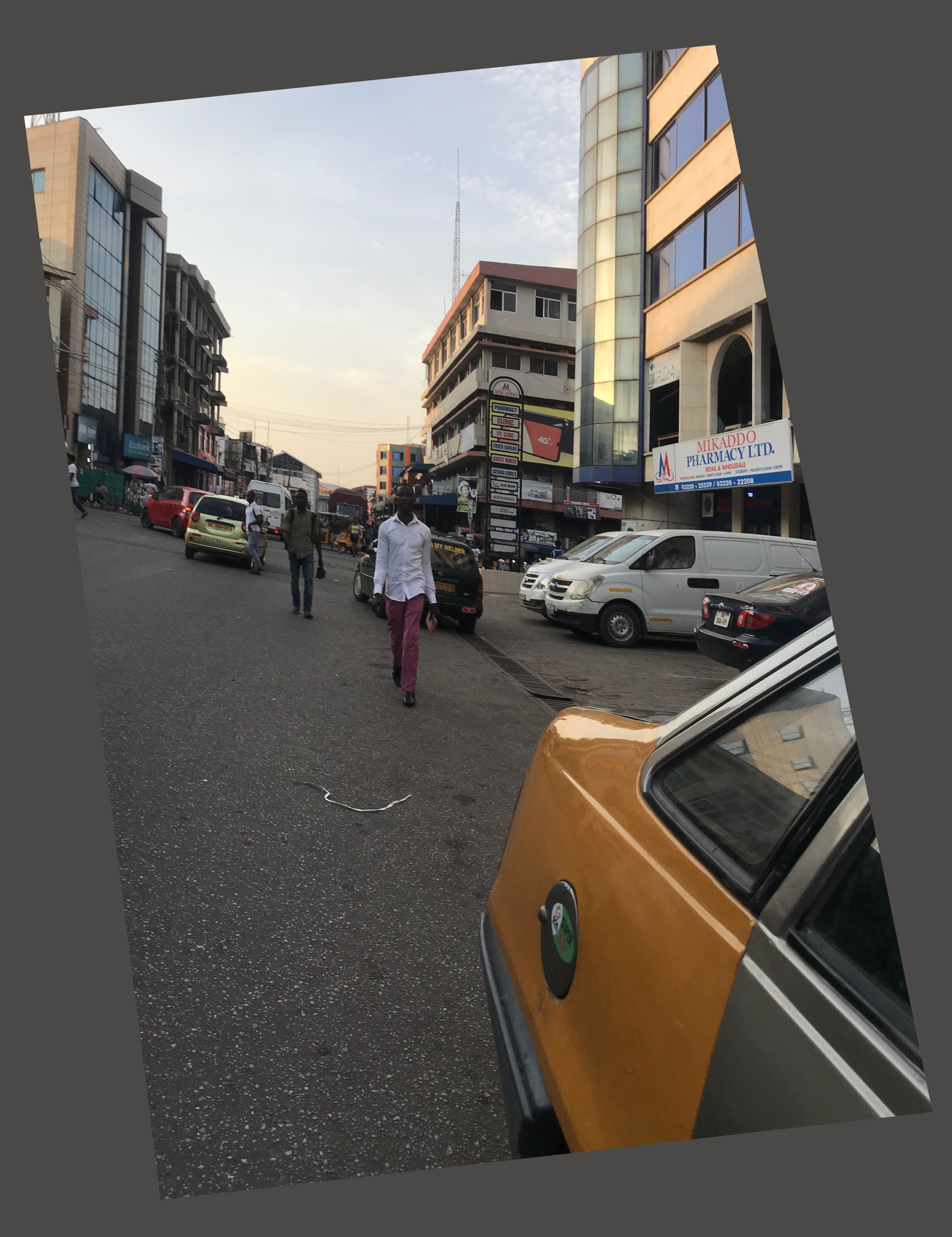
Adum

Adum is suburb of Kumasi. Kumasi is the regional capital of the Ashanti Region of Ghana. Adum is a commercial area with some residential areas. It is in the centre of the regional capital. Adum is a town in the Ashanti Region and it is the central business area of Kumasi. Adum is located between Bantama and Nhyiaso. Most people refer to Adum as Kumasi.

== Notable places ==
- Kumasi Fort and Military Museum
- Adum Prisons Yard
- Kuffour Clinic
- Ashanti Regional Headquarters
