= Battle of Atakpamé =

1764 armed confrontation between the Ashanti Empire and the Akan allies

Coordinates: 7°31′43.1″N 1°7′48.9″E

Date	1764
Location	Atakpamé in Togo
Result	Ashanti Empire Defeat

Belligerents
Ashanti Empire	Kingdom of Akyem; Kingdom of Dahomey; Oyo Empire

The Battle of Atakpamé (1764) was an armed confrontation between the Ashanti Empire and neighboring Akan Allies under the leadership of the Kingdom of Akyem who joined up with the Kingdom of Dahomey under the Oyo Empire in and around Atakpamé in Togo.

== Prelude ==
During the 18th century, the Ashanti Empire was beset by a host of rebellions. This was due in large part, to the empire's policy of allowing conquered rulers a fair amount of autonomy as long as they paid tribute and provided military contingents when ordered. The asantehene during this period was Kusi Oboadum, who had ascended the throne in 1750. During his reign, the southern states under Asante's influence such as Denkyira, Wassa, Twifo and Akyem became openly hostile and threatened the empire's commercial routes to the coast. This was not only a threat to Asante's commercial interests but to its national security, since its supply of firearms came from the coast.

== Casus belli ==
In 1763, the Asante vassal kingdom of Akyem under its King Pobi Asomaning II, the Okyenhene, made contact with the Kingdom of Dahomey while planning a rebellion with other dissidents within the empire, including the Kwahu and Brong. Meanwhile, the bantamahene, one of the major Asante military officers, had been relentlessly pressuring Asantehene Kusi Oboadum for war. Bantamahene Adu Gyamera had even gone so far as to threaten the ruler's impeachment. The asantehene did not order an invasion, however, until learning that the Akyem had sought out aid from the Oyo Empire.

== Battle ==
Sometime in 1764, the Ashanti army defeated the Akyem rebellion. A handful of the rebels fled east past the Volta River. The Ashanti army crossed the Volta in pursuit of the rebels. The exact size of either force is unknown. What historians are sure of is that the Ashanti army was ambushed in or near Atakpamé in what is now Togo. Forces of the Oyo Empire including the Dahomean infantry, the kingdom's elite Ahosi corps of female soldiers, as well as levies from the Oyo Empire, were able to hold the Ashanti army to a standstill. During the battle, the Juabenhene (head of the royal clan of Oyoko) was killed. The Ashanti army never reached Dahomey and was forced to retreat marking a victory for the Oyo Empire. An estimated number of 10,000 to 12,000 Ashanti army were either killed or made slaves of.

== Aftermath ==
News reached European merchants trading with the alliance that they had inflicted a severe defeat on the Ashanti. The consequences were far reaching in that the unpopular Asantehene was removed and replaced by the more youthful Osei Kwadwo. According to Dupuis in 1824, the Alaafin of Oyo yearned to reconcile relations with the Ashanti following the battle. There were fewer documented confrontations between Ashanti and Dahomey in the early 19th century, but peace was the norm between them. This particular battle caused the Ashanti to refocus their foreign policy back to their original goals rather than spreading themselves too thin.

== See also ==
- History of Togo
- Ashanti Empire
- Kingdom of Dahomey
- Oyo Empire

== Sources ==
- Fage, J.D. and Roland Oliver (1975). The Cambridge History of Africa Volume 4 c. 1600 - c. 1790. Cambridge: Cambridge University Press. p. 811. ISBN 0-521-20981-1.
- Thornton, John K. (1999). Warfare in Atlantic Africa 1500-1800. London and New York: Routledge. ISBN 1-85728-393-7.
- Pescheux, Gérard (2003). Le royaume asante (Ghana): parenté, pouvoir, histoire, XVIIe-XXe siècles. Paris: KARTHALA Editions. p. 582. ISBN 2-84586-422-1.
