= Osei Kwadwo =

4th Asantehene of the Ashanti Empire

4th Asantehene of the Ashanti Empire
- Reign: c. 1764 – 1777
- Predecessor: Kusi Obodom
- Successor: Osei Kwame Panyin
- Born: c. 1735
- Died: c. 1777
- Issue: Akyaawa Yikwan

Osei Kwadwo was the 4th Asantehene of the Ashanti Empire who reigned from 1764 to 1777. Osei Kwadwo was elected in replacement of Kusi Obodom who was removed out of power.

The Kwadwoan Revolution fostered during the reign of Asantehene Osei Kwadwo which led to the growth of meritocracy in the Ashanti Empire. The Asantehene formed various institutions for the administration of the state. In foreign affairs, the Asantehene waged war on the Alliance in 1765 which led to the subjudication of Akyem. States such as the Assin and Banda were conquered into the empire as the Ashanti formed cooperative relations with the Fante until relations declined between both states starting from 1765.

An Ashanti invasion of Krobo was foiled in 1772. Osei Kwadwo maintained peaceful relations with the Fante in the latter part of his reign. The Asantehene intervened in a civil disorder at Dagbon with the arrest of the Dagbon leader in 1772. Historians have debated whether Osei Kwadwo conquered Dagbon through war or diplomacy. He also improved relations with the Kingdom of Dahomey through an exchange of diplomatic missions.The Asantehene died in 1777, having announced Opoku Kwame as his successor before death. Succession disputes emerged after the death of the Asantehene until the ascension of Osei Kwame Panyin as his successor.

== Ascension ==
Osei Kwadwo (born c. 1735) was the son of Akua Afriyie, a sister of Kusi Obdodom, and Owusu Afriyie who was a son of Osei Kofi Tutu I. Kwadwo came into power around 1764 as replacement of Kusi Obodum whose removal was influenced by Ashanti's defeat against Oyo and Dahomey that year, as well as the loss of the Dwaben-hene in the conflict. In October 1764, Director-General J.P.T. Huydecooper recorded from Elmina stating;

"the drunkard Kusie", who had long ruled Ashanti, and as a result of whose cowardly attitude the trading paths had been closed for so long, "has now been kicked out of government and has been succeeded by a courageous youngman, Zai (Osei), who would most certainly follow the footsteps of the late king Poku"...

— Huydecooper

== Domestic affairs ==
=== Kwadwoan Revolution ===
The Kwadwoan Revolution occurred under Osei Kwadwo which was a period of bureaucratic reforms by the Asantehene. Osei Kwadwo replaced hereditary positions with appointive ones and the Ashanti administrative structure was professionalized as a result. Authority was no longer obtained based on predetermined status as Thomas Edward Bowdich wrote in 1821 that "the aristocracy in Ashantee until Sai Cudjo's [Osei Kwadwo] time, always acquired this dignity by inheritance only." The Asantehene's reforms enabled individuals to obtain power based on their merit.

=== Reforms ===
The Ankobia was founded as an internal security force. The Asokwafo evolved under the Asantehene to administer over the company of state traders. By the early 19th century, the leader of the Asokwafo was appointed Batahene to manage the state trading organization. During his reign, Osei Kwadwo formed the office of the Akwanmofohene, which translates as "chief inspector of the nuisances and path cleaners." It was formed as the head of the Akwanmofo, which was the agency responsible for the maintaining the roads of the Ashanti Empire. The first to be appointed into the Akwanmofohene office was Adabo, son of Kusi Obodom. Osei Kwadwo also commenced the Inner Council as an alternative to the Asantemanhyiamu, whose meetings were inconsistent and unwieldy. Describing the authority of Ashanti's resident commissioners on the coast in 1817, Bowdich attributes the development of the institution to Asantehene Osei Kwadwo, stating; "it was a law of Sai Cudjo...which granted to particular captains the honourable patent of receiving the pay of small forts, distinctly, each being responsible for his separate duties to his settlement."

In 1770, Konadu Yaadom was made Asantehemaa by the Asantehene who transferred a new stool from Kokofu to Kumasi for this purpose. A Dutch report in 1758 documented a reigning Asantehemaa called "Akjaaba" in the source but recognized as Akyaama by modern historians. An English report in 1766 accounts for a serious conflict between the reigning Asantehemaa and Asantehene osei Kawadwo. Historians such as McCasackie have argued that before Konadu Yaadom was enstooled as Asantehemaa, the reigning queen was Akyaama who was removed from office in 1770 following her conflict with Asantehene Osei Kwadwo from the 1760s. She was further erased from the royal genealogies.

== Foreign affairs ==
=== North ===
Osei Kwadwo engaged in war against Banda after the killing of Ashanti traders in the state. Banda was supported by Gyaman, Denkyira, Wassa and the Kong Empire. The campaign took place as an open pitched battle of which Banda was able to resist Ashanti's attacks twice until they were subjugated into the empire during Ashanti's third attack.

Amid civil disorders in Dagbon, Osei Kwadwo sent a force under Kwaaten Pete to reoccupy and arrest the Ya-na Abdallah Gariba around 1772. This comes from the source Ta'rikh Daghabawi, where the author notes the arrest of the Ya Na and he writes that "his sons ransomed him for a thousand slaves. This became tribute between Dagomba and Asante." Dispute prevails as to whether Dagbon was conquered through or war or diplomatic means. Scholar Ward writes about Osei Kwadwo's conquest of Dagbon as he coerced the Ya Na to pay tribute of a thousand slaves, cows, sheep and fowls. Historian Arhin also argues that Dagbon was defeated through conquest. Scholar A. A. Lliasu contradicts this where he argues that Osei Kwadwo enabled friendly relations with Dagbon after a faction invited his intervention amid Dagbon's civil war. He argues that Ashanti and Dagbon's relations were "a state of politico-economic symbiosis" as opposed to conquest or tributary. Lliasu does admit that Dagbon paid 200 slaves to the Ashanti Empire between 1744 and 1874.

=== South ===
During the reign of Kusi Obodom, an alliance was formed among the coastal states including Akyem, Wassa, Denkyira, Twifo and Fante. This alliance was formed to oppose Ashanti expansionism towards the Coast. By the late 1750s, the alliance disintegrated following the withdrawal of the Fante as well as the decline in relations with fellow member Denkyira. In June 1765 Osei Kwadwo waged war on the alliance. The armies of Wassa and Twifo escaped to Fante territory but the Akyem were defeated. As a result, Akyem Abuakwa was conquered into the Ashanti Empire. This conquest enabled the Ashanti to open the 5th Great Road by 1766.

In 1765, Osei Kwadwo established a military camp in the Fante territory of Abora following an agreement between the Ashanti and Fante. The base was formed to foster attacks against Wassa. In the process of this occupation, the Fante shared mistrust for Ashanti as this resulted in a decline of relations between both states. The Fante refused to share the spoils of the war against Akyem and they sold some Ashanti, who came into their villages for food, as slaves. Emissaries were sent on behalf of Ashanti to investigate Fante's hostility, but they were captured. Ashanti declared war as the last alternative and a direct confrontation was reported to have occurred between 17 and 28 June 1765, but this did not evolve into full-scale war. Osei Kwadwo withdrew back inland around July due to factors such as poor logistics. The Fante built a new alliance with former enemies, Wassa and Twifo in 1765, to check against a potential invasion by the Ashanti. Two invasion scares by Ashanti occurred in 1767 when the Fante almost consented aid for an Akyem rebellion, and when they executed a messenger belonging to a relative of Osei Kwadwo. Peaceful relations fostered between both states until 1772, when the Ashanti were believed to have supported the Assin who plundered Fante territory.

In 1772, Kwadwo defeated the Akyem Abuakwa ruler Obirikorang Abodee as the Akyem leader was chased out of his kingdom by 1773. He was replaced by another ruler selected by the Ashanti. In July 1772, Kwadwo sent envoys to the three Europeans forts in Accra through which he asked the governors of the forts for an installment of salary that could only be paid through firearms for four years. The Dutch and Danes agreed to the request although the British did not want to supply firearms to the enemies of their allied Fante states. The British wanted to also prevent hostile relations with Ashanti. Governor David Mill sent the weapons to Thomas Drew in Accra to be delivered to the Ashanti. Word of the supply reached the Fante who encamped a large military force near Accra, to ambush the Ashanti party. The party evaded this ambush as the Fante suspected the Ga for warning the Ashanti beforehand.

In December 1772, an Ashanti army marched through Accra where the leader of the army, Adusei, assured the Ga chiefs and Europeans of peaceful intentions. It was reported that year that the Ashanti army was defeated in the Krobo Mountains. The purpose behind this Ashanti invasion is unknown. In November 1775, an Ashanti delegation arrived in Abora where it concluded peace terms with the Fante council. Academic scholar Tenkorang states that, the Ashanti wanted to draw the Fante out of their conflict with Wassa. The Ashanti invaded Wassa in May 1776. King Enimil I of Wassa renewed an alliance with the Fante in response. By September 1776, the Ashanti invasion was defeated with Fante support.

Between July 1773 until news reached of his death at Cape Coast Castle in 1778, Osei Kwadwo maintained calm relations with the Fante according to historian Margaret Priestly. Under his predecessor, Kusi Obodom, Ashanti–Dahomey relations had soured. After Dahomean King Kpengla came into power in the late 18th century, he sent an embassy with gifts to Kumasi to improve the relations between the two states. Osei Kwadwo requited this gesture by sending an embassy to Abomey, the capital of Dahomey. Historian Wilks hypothesizes that it was through these exchange of missions between the two leaders that the Togo hills was affirmed as a neutral zone between Ashanti and Dahomey.

== Death ==
Osei Kwadwo died in 1777 as news of his death reached Accra by November 1777. At the end of his reign, he managed to consolidate the interior territories of the Empire by suppressing several revolts, reconquered the Assin and Wassa territories and he submitted Akwamu, Akuapim as well as Sehwi to Ashanti authority. Before his death, Osei Kwadwo declared Opoku Kwame as the next Asantehene. Upon his death, the kingmakers ignored this request as a period internal disorder developed within the state which led to the ascension of Osei Kwame Panyin as the successor of Osei Kwadwo.

== See also ==
- List of rulers of Asante
