= Thomas Edward Bowdich =

19th-century English traveller

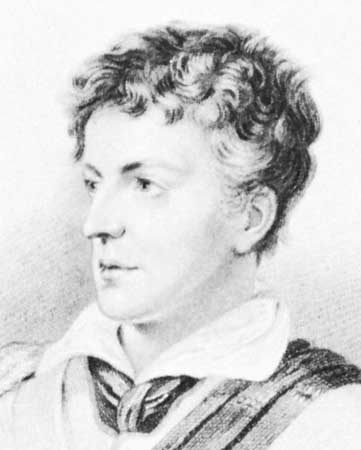
Thomas Edward Bowdich, after William Derby.

Thomas Edward Bowdich (20 June 1791 – 10 January 1824) was an English traveller and author.

== Life ==
Bowdich was born in Bristol, England, and was educated at Bristol Grammar School. In 1813, he married Sarah Wallis, who shared his subsequent career. In 1814, through his uncle, John Hope Smith, governor of the British Gold Coast settlements, he obtained a writership in the service of the African Company of Merchants and was sent to Cape Coast. In 1817, he was sent, with two companions, William Hutchison and Henry Tedlie, to Kumasi on a mission to Osei Bonsu, the King of Asante, and chiefly through his skilful diplomacy the mission succeeded in its object of securing British control over the coast natives.

In 1818, Bowdich returned to England, and in 1819 published an account of his mission and of the study he had made of the court of Kumasi, entitled Mission from Cape Coast Castle to Ashantee, &c. (London, 1819). He donated his Ashanti collection to the British Museum on his return, although the items would not receive the attention of the museum's trustees until after his death. His collection was an attempt to acquire items that depicted local crafts at the time. The collection remains the earliest documented one of Ashanti material, some of them the oldest surviving from that time, such as the oldest-known surviving adinkra cloth.

Bowdich publicly attacked the management of the African committee who ran the African Company of Merchants. His strictures were instrumental in leading the British government to dissolve the African Company and assume direct control over the Gold Coast.

From 1820 to 1822, Bowdich lived in Paris, France, studying mathematics and the natural sciences, and he was on intimate terms with Georges Cuvier, Alexander von Humboldt and other savants. During his stay in France, Bowdich edited several works on Africa, and also wrote scientific works. In 1822, accompanied by his wife, he went to Lisbon, Portugal, where, from a study of historic manuscripts, he published An Account of the Discoveries of the Portuguese in . . . Angola and Mozambique (London, 1824). In 1823, Bowdich and his wife, after some months spent in Madeira and the Cape Verde Islands, arrived at Bathurst (now Banjul) at the mouth of the Gambia, intending to go to Sierra Leone and thence explore the interior. However, Bowdich died from malaria while in Bathurst on 10 January 1824, leaving his widow Sarah with three children.

His widow, Sarah (Wallis) Bowdich Lee, published an account of Bowdich's last journey, entitled Excursions in Madeira and Porto Santo . . . to which is added A Narrative of the Continuance of the Voyage to its Completion, &c (London, 1825). Bowdich's daughter, Mrs Tedlie Hutchison Hale, republished in 1873, with an introductory preface, her father's Mission from Cape Coast Castle to Ashantee.

== Works ==
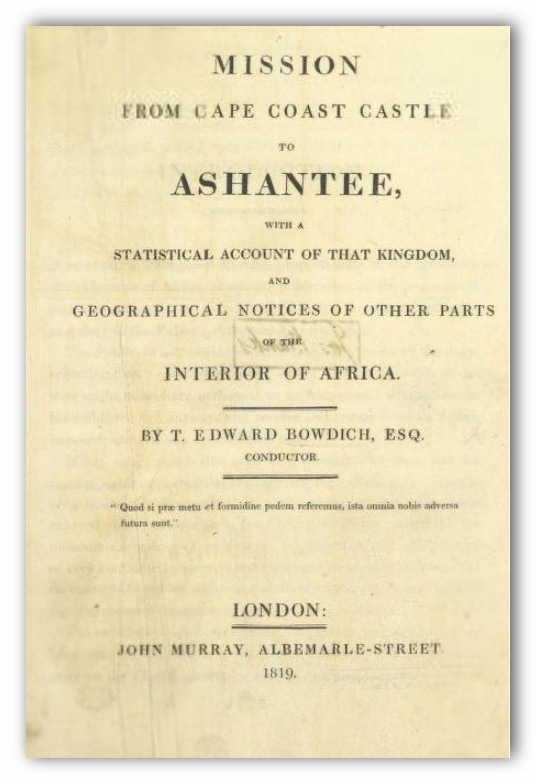
Title page

- Bowdich, Thomas Edward (1819), Mission from Cape Coast Castle to Ashantee, with a statistical account of that kingdom, and geographical notices of other parts of the interior of Africa, London: J. Murray
- Bowdich, Thomas Edward (1821), An Essay on the Superstitions, Customs, and Arts, Common to the Ancient Egyptians, Abyssinians, and Ashantees, Paris: printed by J. Smith, Rue Montmorency
- Bowdich, Thomas Edward (1822), Elements of Conchology Including the Fossil Genera and the Animals, Treuttel & Würtz
- Bowdich, Thomas Edward (1873), Mission from Cape Coast Castle to Ashantee, with a Descriptive Account of that Kingdom, London: Griffith & Farran
