= Ivor Wilks =

British academic (1928–2014)

Professor Emeritus Ivor G. Wilks (19 July 1928 – 7 October 2014) was a noted British Africanist and historian, specializing in Ghana. Considered one of the founders of modern African historiography, he was an authority on the Ashanti Empire in Ghana and the Welsh working-class movement in the 19th century. At the time of his death, he was Professor Emeritus of History at Northwestern University in Illinois, USA.

== Life and career ==
In the 1940s Wilks was a Lieutenant in the British Army, in Palestine. He attended Bangor University, and as an ardent supporter of Welsh independence participated in Welsh nationalist politics and the Welsh Republican Movement. Graduating in 1951, he took a degree in philosophy at Oxford University.

In 1953 Wilks left Oxford for the University College of the Gold Coast (now the University of Ghana), where he devoted his long career to what he described as the decolonization of West African history. His work examines the nature of power and leadership, collaboration and resistance. He was instrumental in setting up the Institute of African Studies at the University of Ghana, Legon.

In 1966 he relocated to Northwestern University in the USA, where he remained until retirement.

He was married to Grace O. Amanor and then to Nancy Lawler from 1989. He had four children, who live in Ghana, the USA and the UK.

== Contributions ==
His 1975 book Asante in the 19th Century remains both a classic and a standard text of Africanist scholarship.

Wilks was the author of 178 published works, and is considered one of the founders of modern African historiography.

== Awards ==
- ASA Distinguished Africanist Award 1998,
- Herskovits Professor of African Studies,
- Professor Emeritus

== Selected bibliography ==
- 1961 The Northern Factor in Ashanti History. Legon: Institute of African Studies.
- 1975. Asante in the Nineteenth Century: The Structure and Evolution of a Political Order. Cambridge: Cambridge University Press.
- 1984. South Wales and the Rising of 1839: Class Struggle as Armed Struggle. Urbana & Chicago: University of Illinois Press.
- 1986 (with N. Levtzion & B. Haight). Chronicles from Gonja: A West African Tradition of Muslim Historiography. Cambridge: Cambridge University Press.
- 1989. Wa and the Wala: Islam and Polity in Northwestern Ghana. Cambridge: Cambridge University Press.
- 1993. Forests of Gold: Essays on the Akan and the Kingdom of Asante. Athens, Ohio: Ohio University Press.
- 1995. A Portrait of Otumfuo Opoku Ware II as a Young Man. Anansesem Publications.
- 1996. One Nation, Many Histories: Ghana past and present. Anansesem Publications.
- 2001. Akwamu 1640–1750: a Study of the Rise and Fall of a West African Empire. Department of History. Trondheim: Norwegian University of Science and Technology.
