= Opoku Fofie =

Sixth monarch of the Ashanti Empire

- Asantehene
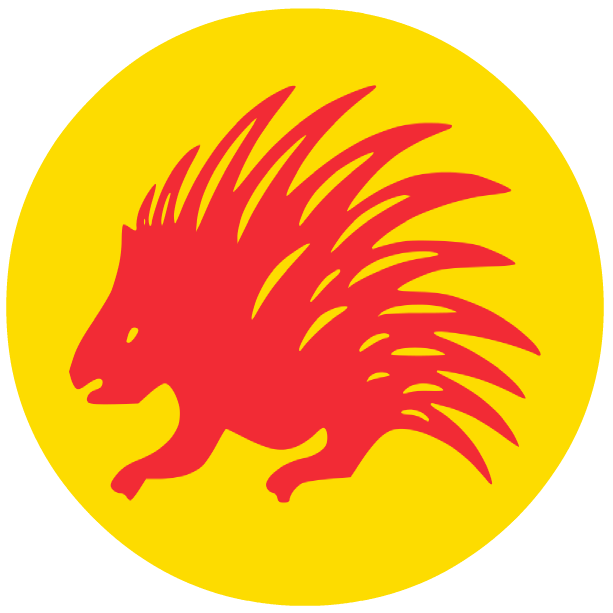
- Representation of a porcupine: nickname given to the kingdom of Kumasi and emblem of the Ashanti Empire.
- Predecessor: Osei Kwame Panyin
- Successor: Osei Bonsu
- Born: circa 1775
- Died: March 1804
- Father: Adu Twum
- Mother: Konadu Yaadom

Opoku Fofie, born around 1775 and died in March 1804, was the sixth asantehene (monarch) of the Ashanti Empire, belonging to the dynastic house of Opoku Ware of the Oyoko clan. The youngest son of the asantehemaa (queen mother) Konadu Yaadom and Adu Twum Kaakyire, he acceded to the throne by the principle of dynastic alternation in force since the founding of the empire, after the crisis that opposed his mother to her predecessor Osei Kwame from 1797 to 1803.

The removal of Osei Kwame, followed by Barnabu's battle against his armed Muslim supporters in the tributary states of Gyaman and Kong, paved the way for his accession to the throne. His reign began in December 1803, coinciding with the ritual suicide of his predecessor, and lasted no more than sixty days. This situation gave rise to the myth of Osei Kwame's vengeful spirit (saman). Osei Bonsu succeeded him in 1804.

Official versions of Ashanti genealogy differ greatly from historical research, due to the numerous genealogical modifications aimed at erasing the existence of Akyaama in the lineage. Indeed, the asantehemaa are the guarantors of tradition, official genealogy, and succession to the asantehene throne. This conflict is at the root of the many divergences.

== Biography ==
Dynastic context

Opoku Fofie, born around 1775, was the second son of the asantehemaa (queen mother) Konadu Yaadom and Adu Twum Kaakyire, son of Opoku Ware I, asantehene from 1718 to 1750. Consequently, he belongs to the Bosommuru ntoro (patrilineal dynasty) of Opoku Ware of the Oyoko clan and his accession to the throne respects the principle of dynastic alternation of the asantehene of the Ashanti Empire.

During the reign of Osei Kwame (1777-1801), a major dynastic conflict pitted the asantehene against the queen-mother Konadu Yaadom. This conflict arose from the banishment of Akyaama, mother of Osei Kwame and previous asantehemaa, and the genealogical changes made by Konadu Yaadom. The latter adopted the children of the deposed queen to preserve their right of succession and erase the memory of her predecessor from the collective memory. Akyaama's exile led to a succession of other disqualifications and maneuvers designed to keep her future descendants from the Golden Throne.

In the 1790s, following these rewritings of the royal lineage, Opoku Kwame, Opoku Fofie's eldest brother, was named heir to the throne. Although this agreement eased the conflict between the two dynasties, Opoku Kwame died under suspicious circumstances in 1797. Konadu Yaadom accused the younger Osei Kwame of poisoning his elder son. After an attempt on her life, the asantehemaa fled the capital Kumasi to take refuge in Kokofu with her son Opoku Fofie. Under the prerogatives befitting her office, she appointed the latter as the new legitimate heir to the throne.

Ephemeral reign

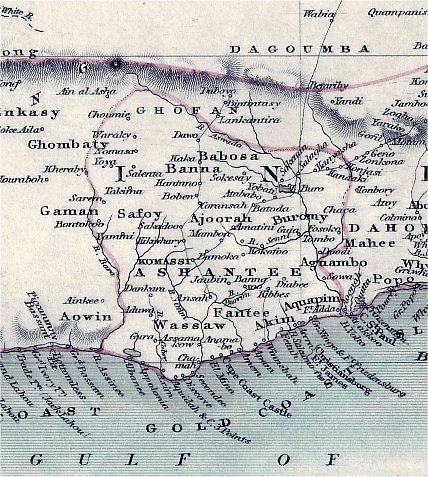
Partial map of the Gold Coast with the delimitation of the Ashanti Empire in the early 19th century. To the west, the kingdom of Gyaman (Gaman), and to the north-west Kong.

In 1801, Konadu Yaadom ordered the removal of Osei Kwame, but the latter fled to Juaben and planned to continue exercising power there in his own right. The Muslims of Gyaman and Kong, to whom he is close, rise to demand his restoration to the throne. Opoku Fofie, who governs from Kumasi as his heir, learns that Muslim armies are heading his way. To counter this, he won broad support from the districts surrounding Kumasi, as well as from the Akan tributary states of Banda, Takyiman, and Nkoransa. He created a new fekuw (company) made up of Muslim military units loyal to him, to reinforce the Ankobea (institution of the Empire's army).

Faced with the risk of civil war, Osei Kwame agreed to surrender in 1803. The rebel armies supporting him nevertheless continued to advance on Kumasi. The confrontation took place at Barnabou, near the village of Boabeng, 15 km northeast of Techiman. Opoku Fofie won the battle and took several thousand prisoners, including around 5,000 Muslims. None of them were executed in human sacrifice or sold into slavery, as they either repurchased their freedom or were ransomed by neighboring Muslim states. According to Ivor Wilks, Opoku Fofie coordinated the fifteen-month military campaign and did not accede to the Ashanti royal throne until the battle was over, in December 1803.

It was also in December 1803 that Osei Kwame committed suicide. According to Thomas McCaskie, Opoku Fofie's accession to the throne took place either on December 5/12, 1803, or January 16/23, 1804. However, given that more than half the “royals” (Note: Term used in scientific literature (Wilks, McCaskie, Pescheux, ...) to designate any member of the Ashanti aristocracy with a title of nobility is named royal without actually being part of the Asantehene royal dynasty. They each belong to their royal dynasty.) of the Oyoko clan attended his enthronement, while the other half attended Osei Kwame's funeral, he concludes that these events took place in the immediate vicinity. Because of the periods of homage scheduled in Ashanti tradition for these two events, he favors the two possible dates in December 1803.

Opoku Fofie's reign came to an abrupt end sixty days after his coronation, following his sudden death. In 1817, Thomas Edward Bowdich reported that Opoku Fofie reigned for only a few weeks. Colonial archives note that news of his death reached the European governors of the Gold Coast in March 1804. In the official Ashanti version, his death is dated 1799, to respect the revised genealogical order. However, Ivor Wilks' research, combined with contemporary documents, confirms that the end of his reign was before or during March 1804.

== Posterity ==
=== Black throne ===
According to Ashanti tradition, the funeral of an asantehene is accompanied by the blackening of his throne. This is then called akonwa tuntum (black throne) and joins the house of thrones, a mausoleum dedicated to the asantehene. Although the Ashanti say that the throne is coated with human blood, it is a mixture of soot, egg yolk, and sheep's blood. (Note: Several recipes exist for the bath in which the throne is soaked to commemorate the ancestors. Sacrifices or blood collected from humans are sometimes mentioned, but more generally blood from animals is used.) Given the context of the end of Osei Kwame's reign, no black throne was dedicated to him, meaning that his funeral rites were not fully completed. Conversely, Opoku Fofie did have one, despite his short-lived reign.

=== Symbolism ===
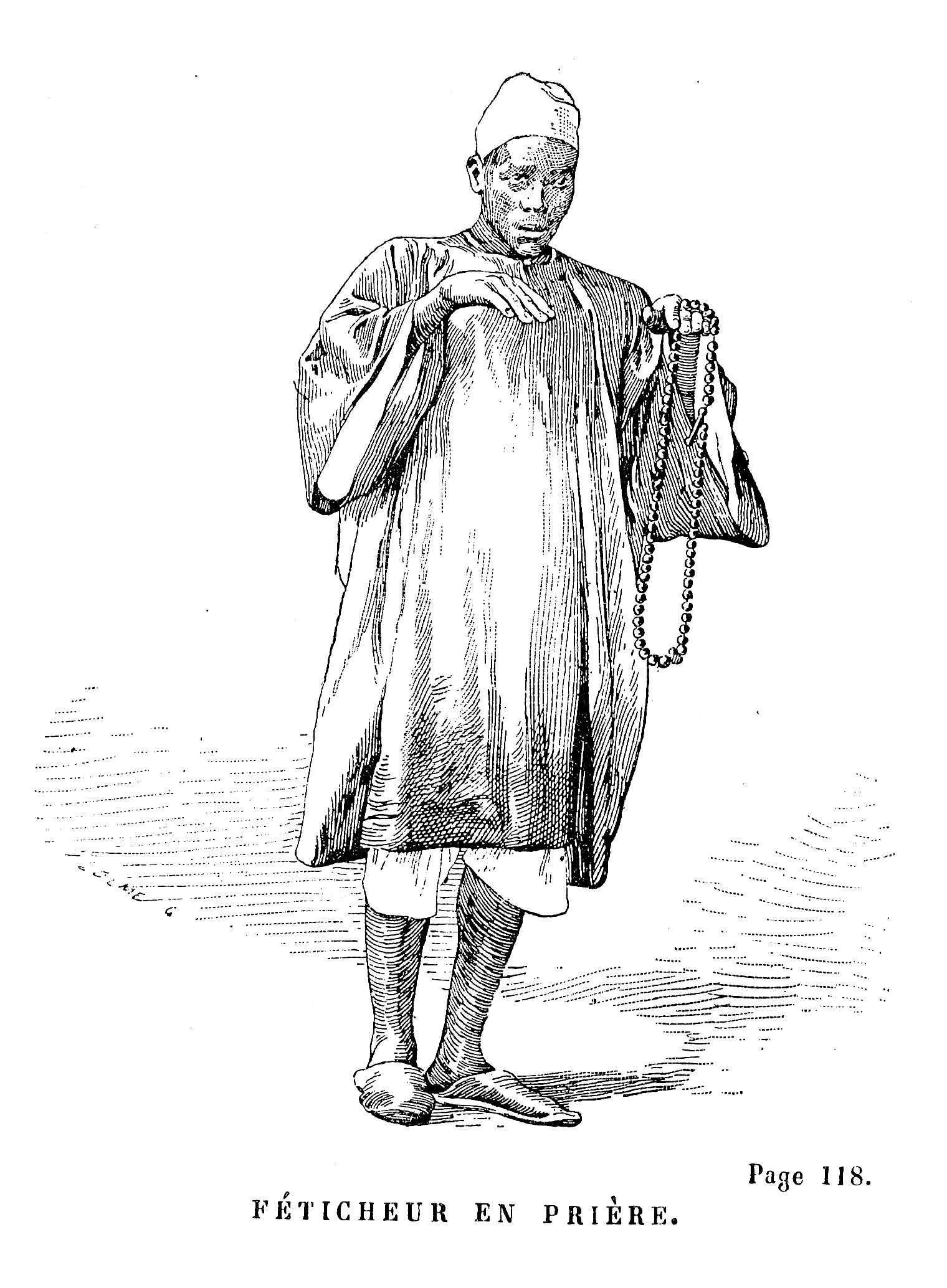
Wizards play a key role in Ashanti witchcraft rituals.

Despite his brief reign, Opoku Fofie left a strong imprint on Ashanti's oral tradition and cultural heritage. This is due to several factors: a turbulent dynastic context, the proximity between Opoku Fofie's enthronement and Osei Kwame's funeral, and his sudden and imminent death.

Ashantis believes that Opoku Fofie was killed by the saman (ghost) of his predecessor for having slept with Firempomaa Tanowaa, one of his favorites, before the end of his funeral. Opoku Fofie's death was seen as a further consequence of the conflict between the yafunu (a dynastic branch from the same matrix) members of Akyaama and those of Konadu Yaadom, so much so that the latter's death was also attributed to the ghost of Osei Kwame. In 1820, Joseph Dupuis reported the causes presented by oral tradition, evoking witchcraft, and also spoke of a chronic illness that took his life.

The symbolism of this story links the incompleteness of the funeral rituals granted to Osei Kwame to the premature death of his successor. Indeed, the immediate proximity of the coronation of a new asantehene and the burial of the old one is unconventional in Ashanti tradition, where funeral rituals are supposed to be completed beforehand.

=== Consequences ===
According to the rule of succession, the Osei Tutu house is to succeed. The three candidates, Osei Kofi, Osei Bonsu, and Osei Badu, are all children of Konadu Yaadom, who married Owusu Ansah, son of Osei Kwadwo. Osei Bonsu succeeded to the throne, confirming the principle of dynastic rotation and strengthening the influence of the asantehemaa. Thanks to genealogical modifications, she succeeded in completing Akyaama's dynastic erasure. To resolve dynastic conflicts, Osei Bonsu decreed a new law whereby the asantehene's sons and grandsons became heirs presumptive to the royal throne.

Opoku Fofie's short-lived reign also weakened cohesion between the states of the Ashanti Empire by strengthening active rebel forces. This period benefited the Gyaman in particular, who attacked the smaller surrounding states that were allies of the Empire. Other tributary states also stopped paying tribute. The situation in the region did not calm down until after 1819.

The causes of death potentially linked to witchcraft are so deeply rooted in Ashanti oral tradition and culture that they are responsible for the emergence of three anti-witchcraft cults between 1879 and 1920. Indeed, the attribution of Opoku Fofie's death to witchcraft echoes the growing interest in witchcraft since the late eighteenth century.

== Genealogical divergence ==
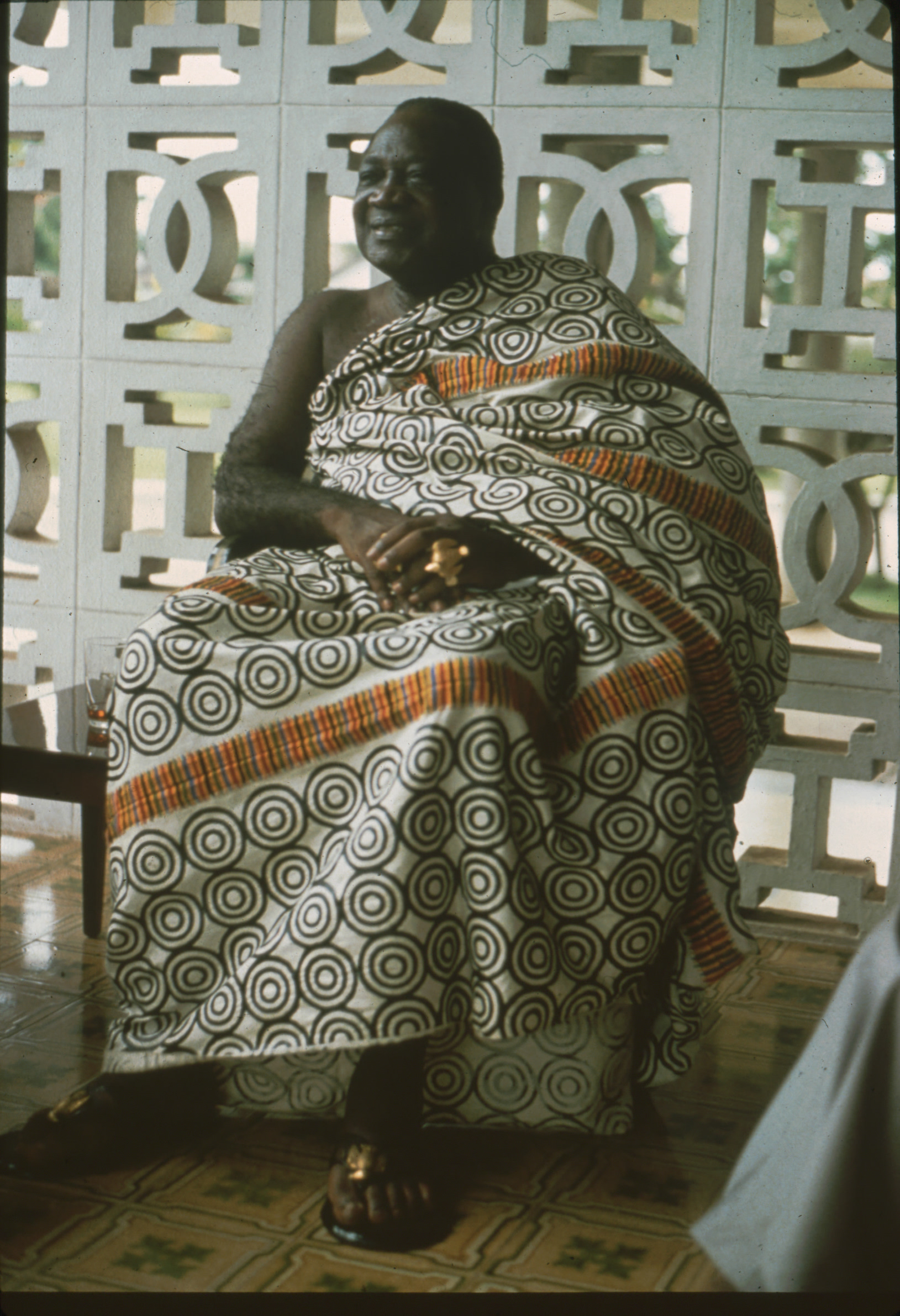
Opoku Ware II, a direct descendant of Opoku Fofie, is the 15th asantehene (1970-1999).

Among Opoku Fofie's siblings are two other asantehene: Osei Bonsu and Osei Yaw Akoto. The official version of the royal genealogy also includes Osei Kwame. No mention is made of Akyaama, who reigned before Konadu Yaadom. Konadu Yaadom made genealogical changes to transfer the matrilineality of the asantehemaa's children to her lineage.

Despite his short reign, Opoku Fofie also fathered several children: Kwame Akyamfo became Apesamakohene (chief of Apesamako), and Adusei Kra became Akotenhene (chief of Akoten). Opoku Ware II is a direct descendant of Opoku Ware I as he comes from a younger line of Opoku Fofie.

There are two opposing genealogical versions. The one established by historians and the one established by the official Ashanti genealogy. Modifications to the official version were at the heart of numerous conflicts and the creation of a new dynastic branch by Kwaku Dua I. These tensions were resolved with the return of dynastic rotation on the accession of Opoku Ware II.

The family tree below shows the difference between the official genealogy, which deletes Akyaama, and that revised by the research of Iron Wilks and Gérard Pescheux.

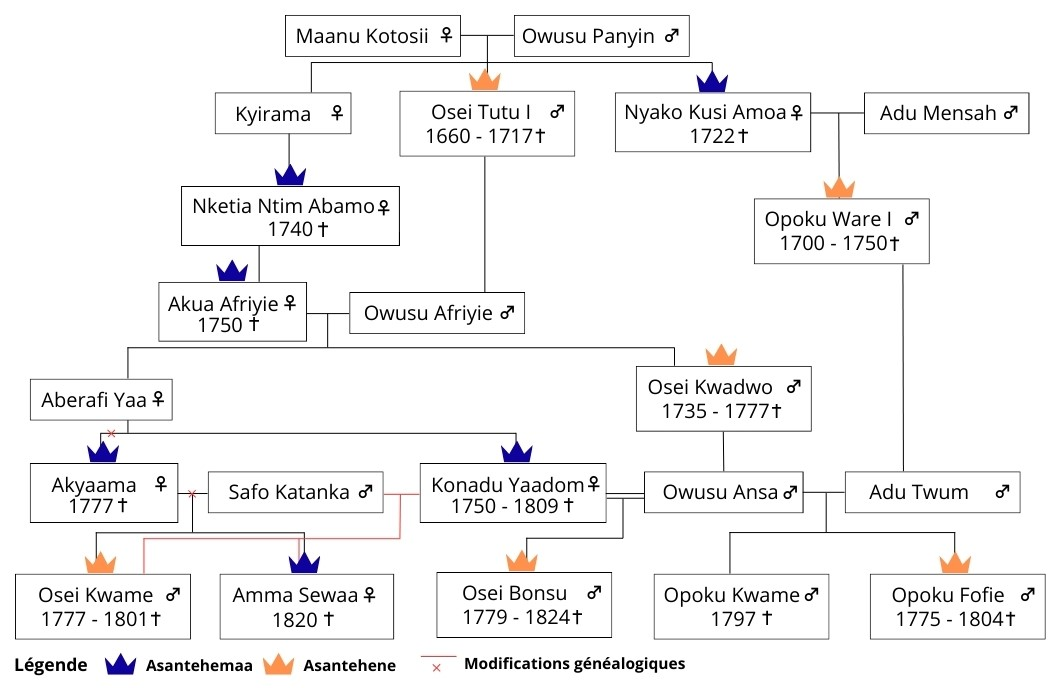

== See also ==
- Osei Bonsu
- Osei Kwame Panyin
- Oyoko (clan)
- Konadu Yaadom

== Bibliography ==
- Pescheux, Gérard (2003). Le royaume asante (Ghana). Karthala Éditions. ISBN 978-2-8111-3751-9.
- Wilks, Ivor (1989). Asante in the Nineteenth Century: The Structure and Evolution of a Political Order. CUP Archive. ISBN 978-0-521-37994-6. JSTOR 182917.
- McCaskie, Thomas C. (1989). "" Death and the Asantehene: A Historical Meditation "". The Journal of African History. 30 (3): 417–444. doi:10.1017/S0021853700024464. ISSN 0021-8537. JSTOR 182467.
- McCaskie, Thomas C. (1995). "KonnurokusΣm: Kinship and Family in the History of the Oyoko KɔKɔɔ Dynasty of Kumase". The Journal of African History. 36 (3): 357–389. doi:10.1017/S0021853700034460. JSTOR 182467. S2CID 162608255.
- Kyerematen, A. (1969). "" The Royal Stools of Ashanti "". Africa: Journal of the International African Institute. 39 (1): 1–10. doi:10.2307/1157946. ISSN 0001-9720. JSTOR 1157946.
