= Prince Kofi Nti of Asante and Trinidad =

Prince Kofi Nti (Nana Kofi Nti) also known in the Caribbean as William Kofi Nti, was the son of King Karikari, the tenth Asantehene, or ruler, of the Ashanti Empire. William was added to his name when he was baptised in England. He spent many years in Trinidad before moving to Sierra Leone and later returning to England.

== Biography ==
King Karikari, the son of Afia Kobi, ruled from 28 May 1867 until his abdication on 26 October 1874. After the 1874 war, the British imposed conditions on the Ashantis to take the sons of King Karikari to be educated in British culture and civilization. After the death of one of the sons from tuberculosis, Prince Kofi was taken to Trinidad in the West Indies as a place of safe exile.

When he arrived in Trinidad, he was placed under the care of James Henry Collins, the headmaster of a boys school at Tranquillity, Port of Spain. His popular name was the "Black Prince". It is believed he socialized with the social elite. It is recorded that he was part of the festivities when two sons of the Prince of Wales, Princes Edward and George, visited the island.

He designed a Victorian-style signal station (lighthouse) on top of the Fort George hills west of Port of Spain. He remained in Trinidad until 1886 and then moved to Sierra Leone. He was appointed as an interpreter to King Prempeh I during the king's stay in Sierra Leone on his way to exile in the Seychelles.

He moved to England after his relationship with the Asante royals turned sour following the refusal of the royals to adopt the English language and as allegations were leveled at him for not speaking the Akan language properly. He later died in England.

The memorial to his lighthouse stands 1,120 above sea level and was built by enslaved Africans.
