= Asantehemaa =

Asante queen mother

The Asantehemaa is the queen mother according to West African custom, who rules the Asante people alongside the Asantehene. African queen mothers generally play an important role in local government; they exercise both political and social power. Their power and influence have declined considerably since pre-colonial times, but still persist in the 21st century .

They have an important role in the Akan tradition which is based on matrilineal descent. In areas of Ghana where Akan culture is predominant, each town has a chief and a queen mother who rule alongside the modern political system.

The Asantehemaa is linked to the traditional Akan system succession of patrilineal and matrilineal alternation . She may not necessarily be the mother of the heir or the king in office. The Asantehemaa have symbols dedicated to their authority and the most significant is a throne carved and decorated with gold. Although there are also queen mothers within the chiefdoms and states internal to the Ashanti state, the title of Asantehemaa is only given to the queen mother designated to rule alongside the Asantehene. This forms a pyramidal political model whose two supreme functions are those of the king and the queen mother.

The Asantehemaa is chosen by the Asantehene in the royal lineage, among the oldest women. It is therefore not systematically the king's mother or an heir. She is considered the royal genealogist and is responsible for determining the legitimacy of members of the royal lineage. The functions of the king and the queen mother are complementary. The Asantehene is the public leader, guided by the advice of the Asantehemaa. She also takes care of domestic policy issues, such as the well-being of women and children or the management of conflicts between communities and chiefdoms. In addition, she holds a session with elders and linguists twice a week at the Kumasi Palace to resolve spiritual or cultural conflicts. Traditionally, the role of the Asantehemaa is to preserve Ashanti customs, rituals and identity

== Etymology ==
In Twi, the term Asantehemaa means queen of the Asantes. It uses the characteristic particle Ohene and hemaa (queen). The queen mother translation is attributed to the anthropologist Robert Sutherland Rattray.

== Function ==
The Asantehemaa occupies a central position in the Ashanti political system since she regulates the legitimacy of successors and guarantees respect for customs and traditions in the actions of the Asantehene. The role of the Asantehemaa is therefore major in the choice of a successor when the Ashanti Royal Throne becomes vacant.

She carries out different rituals, event and religious ceremonies. This includes ancestral veneration and the execution of the various offerings and sacrifices.

She also regulates community conflicts that involve women and can intervene in the event of domestic problems between a man and a woman. She represents the supreme authority for these matters.

The Asantehemaa has her own palace and royal quarters near the Manhyia Palace. She occupies the second highest level of the Ashanti hierarchy and has the power to depose the Asantehene.

== List of Asantehemaa ==
The dynastic list by modern historians does not follow that established by the representatives of the Oyoko clan. The revised chronology and the study of Dutch colonial archives has made it possible for the identification of Asantehemaa Akyaama, who was banished from the throne following a dynastic conflict, and further erased from oral tradition. Historian Thomas McCaskie's concluded that there was genealogical manipulation aimed at legitimizing children conceived out of wedlock, adopted children as well as dismissing and erasing the existence of people banished from the clan.

=== Nyaako Kusi Amoa ===
Oral tradition states that Nyarko Kusi Amoah was Osei Kofi Tutu I's niece and he appointed her as Queen Mother. She married four different nobles from chiefdoms who joined the Ashanti Empire. At the end of the fourth marriage, she gave birth to Opoku Ware I, the second Asantehene. She headed the House of Ohemma (women rulers), in Kumasi, which establishes the structure and functions of the Queen Mother according to the tradition provided by the Oyoko clan. After the founding of the Ashanti Empire, she also obtained a black and silver stool. This seat comes from the previous Queen Mother of Oyoko and is integrated into the hierarchical restructuring carried out by Osei Tutu and Okomfo Anokye. Nyaako was killed during the attack on Kumasi by King Eibirimoro of Aowin in 1717 or 1718.

=== Nketia Ntim Abamo ===
She was one of the last royals who survived the sacking of Kumasi in the early 18th century by Ebrimoro, king of Aowin. Nketia was the daughter of Kyirama, sister of Osei Tutu I and she was the mother of Kusi Obodom. The date of death of Nketia Ntim Abaom is uncertain because she was subject to the genealogical remodeling by Konadu Yaadom, in order to erase the existence of Akyaama from the lineage. Thomas McCaskie proposed her death to have been in the 1740s.

=== Akua Afriyie ===
She was the daughter of Nketia Ntim Abamo. Akua married Owusu Afriyie, a son of Osei Tutu I, and probably ascended to the throne of Asantehemaa in the 1740s. Her son, Osei Kwadwo, was therefore the nephew of Kusi Obodom and also grandson of Osei Tutu I. However, the genealogy surrounding Akua Afriyie was likely rewritten by Konadu Yaadom in order to erase Akyaama's existence and extend Konadu Yaadom's rule and influence. During the reign of Kusi Obodom, Dutch reports speak in 1758 of Akyaama, as Asantehemaa, which means that Akua Afriyie no longer ruled as queen. Her reign came to an end around the 1750s.

=== Akyaama ===
She reigned from the 1750s until her banishment in 1770. She was theoretically Asantehemaa but her banishment caused her dynastic erasure. Her reign was characterized by a succession of dynastic conflicts. Her son, Osei Kwame Panyin is notably reclassified as a child of Konadu Yaadom in order to exclude and erase Akyaama from the Oyoko lineage and oral tradition. Her fall resulted in the creation of a new throne for Asantehemaa Konadu Yaadom.

=== Timeline of known Asantehemaa ===
- Konadu Yaadom, from 1770 or 1778 to 1809.
- Adoma Akosua, from 1809 to 1819, banished following her conspiracy against Osei Bonsu.
- Ama Serwaa, from 1819 to 1820 or 1828.
- Yaa Dufie, from 1820 or 1828 to 1836.
- Afua Sarpon, from 1836 to 1859, banished by King Kwaku Dua I
- Afua Kobi, from 1859 to 1884.
- Yaa Akyaa I, from 1884 to 1896.
- Konadu Yaadom II, from 1917 to 1945.
- Serwa Nyarko II, from 1945 to 1977.
- Nana Afia Kobi Serwaa Ampem II, from 1977 to 2016.
- Nana Konadu Yiadom III, from 2017 to 2025.
- Nana Yaa Akyaa II, from 2026
