= Prempeh =

Prempeh may refer to:

- Prempeh I (1870-1931), Asante ruler
  - Prempeh II, (1892–1970), succeeding ruler of Asante
- Prempeh College, a boarding school in Ghana
- Emma Prempeh (born 1996), British painter
- Jerry Prempeh (born 1988), French footballer
