= Ahenema =

Traditional royal slipper worn by ethnic groups in Ghana

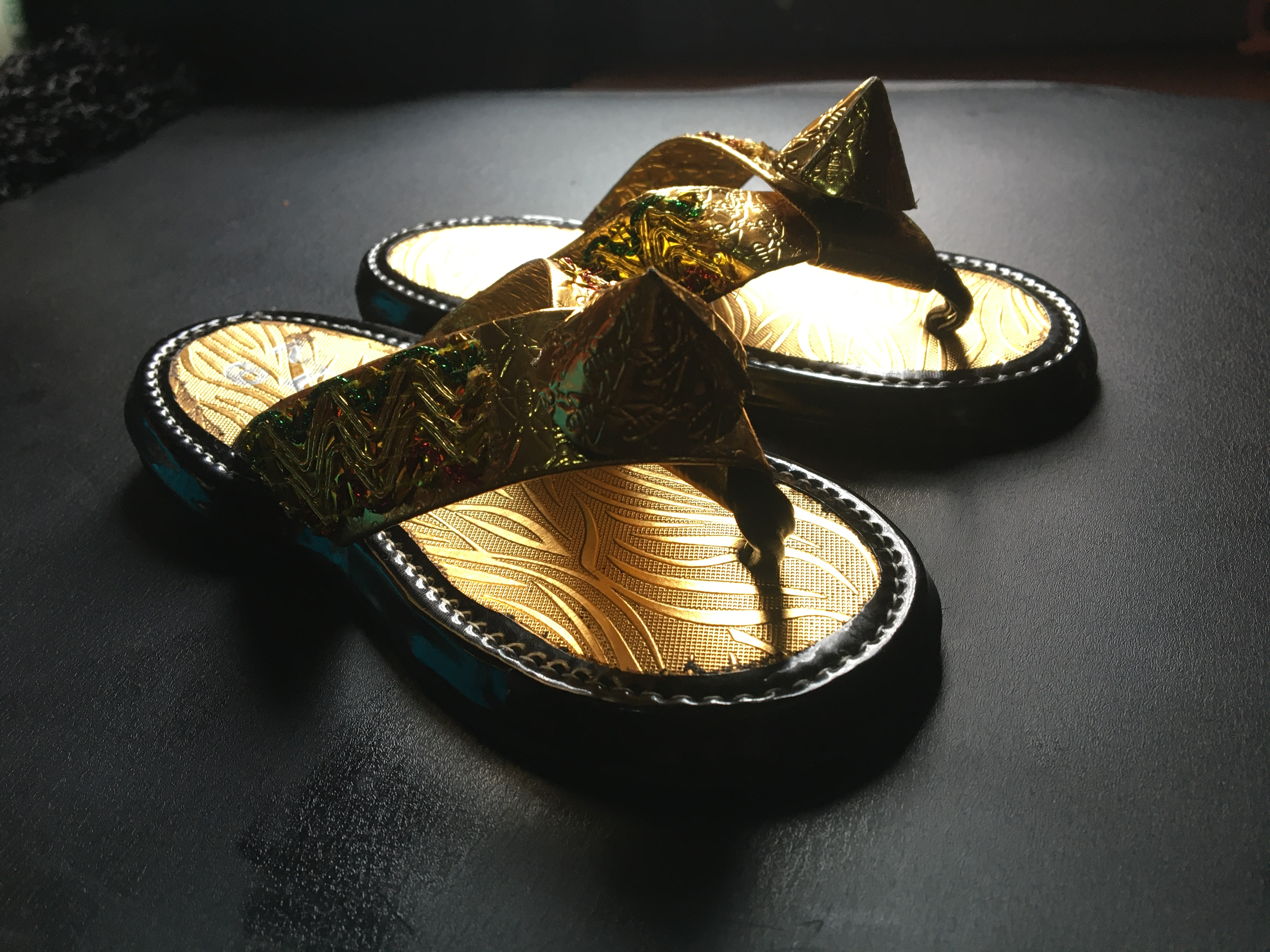
Ahenema slippers

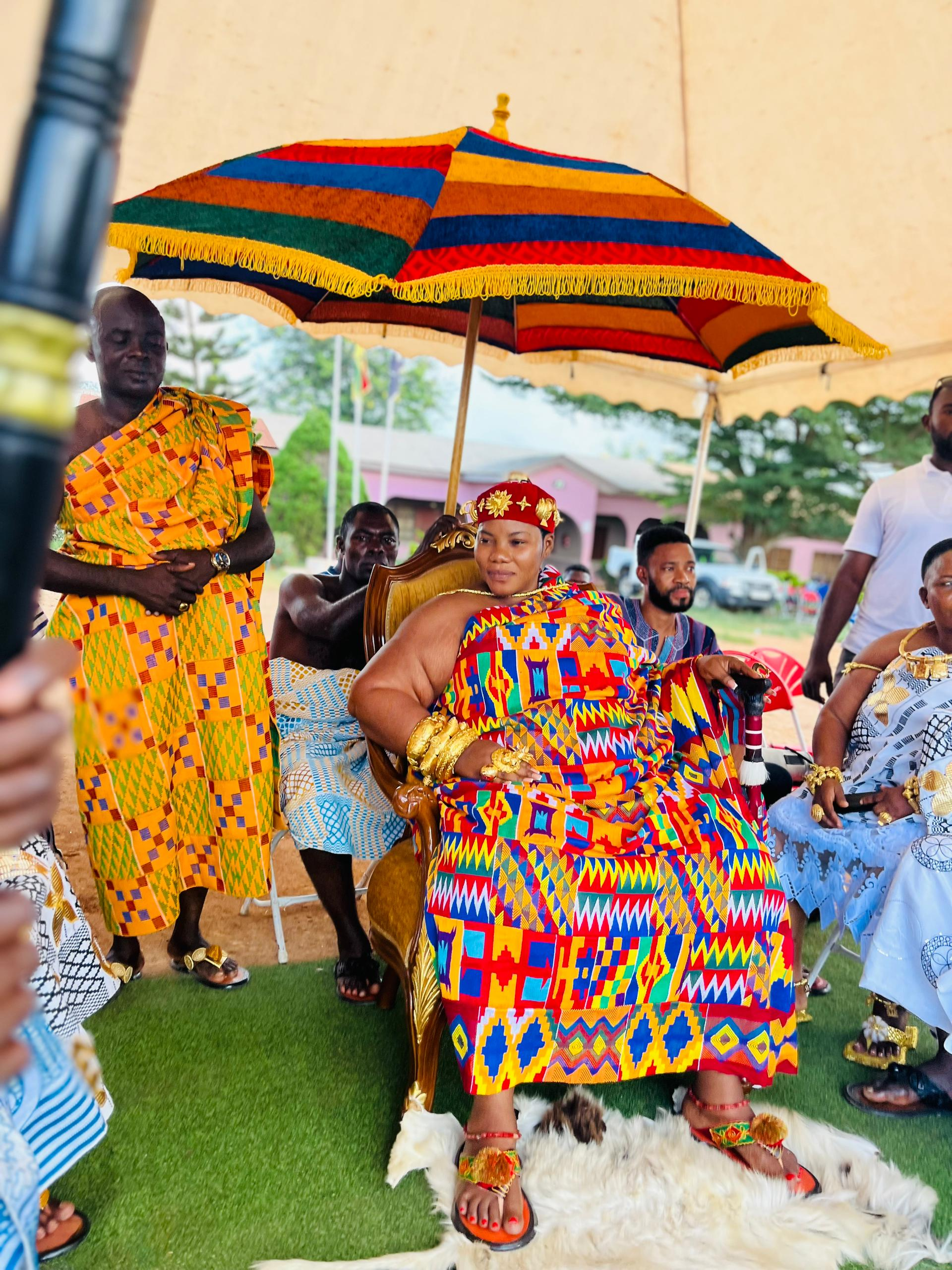
A chief in Ahenema royal slippers

Ahenema is a traditional, royal slipper worn by the Kings, Queens and children of the Akan, Ga, and Ewe ethnic groups in Ghana. This traditional slipper came to be worn by anyone to events such as festivals, funerals, wedding ceremonies and church.

== History ==
Ahenema dates back to the 18th century during the reign of Asantehene Osei Kwadwo and Asantehemaa Konadu Yaadom. In the past, Ahenema were worn by people of royal descent, and was often named after the king. The method of naming was later changed and the Ahemema was named after the children of the king. This was because the kings' name should not be mentioned in vain, hence the name Ahenema, which translates as king's children. The number 8 is carved into the sole of an Ahenema slipper as it represents stability.

== Types ==
There are two types of Ahenema. The first is the "Asansan tuo", which has a curved shape, and the other is the "Atine", which has a straight shape and is worn by chiefs.
