= Panyin =

Panyin may refer to:

- Kwaku Dua I Panyin (c. 1797–1867), Asantehene
- Osei Kwame Panyin (died 1803), Asantehene
