= Adoma Akosua =

African queen mother

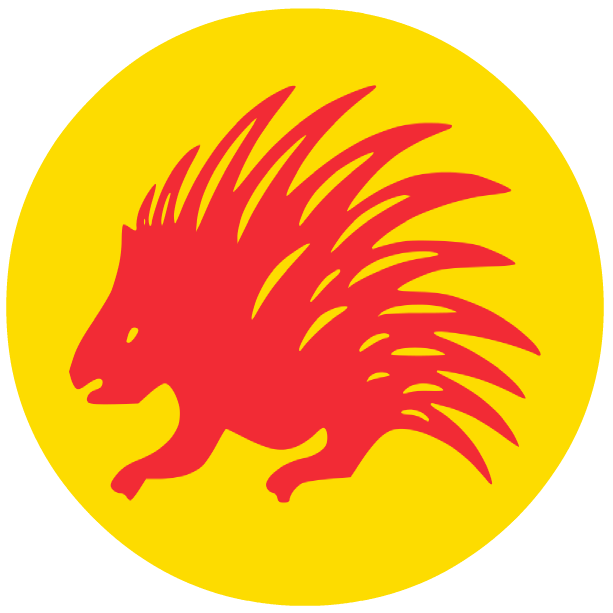
- Emblem of the Ashanti Empire
- Born: 1773; Kumasi
- Died: c. 1838; Kumase
- Occupation: Asantehemaa

Adoma Akosua (born c. 1773) was the fifth Asantehemaa of the Ashanti kingdom in West Africa. Born in about 1773 into the Oyoko clan, where the kingdom's rulers are traditionally chosen, she came from a branch that had been banished and excluded from the succession. In 1807, due to a lack of male heirs in the other lineages, the clan ended its exile; Adoma and her relatives were once again allowed to reside in the capital. In 1809, she ascended to the throne of Asantehemaa, Queen Mother. From 1817, she conspired to overthrow the king (the Asantehene), who had departed on a military campaign against the Gyaman.

Her conspiracy failed, and she was deposed in favor first of her sister-in-law Amma Sewaa, then of her cousin Yaa Dufi.

She probably died in 1838, although official discourse says she was executed by ritual strangulation in 1819.

== Background ==
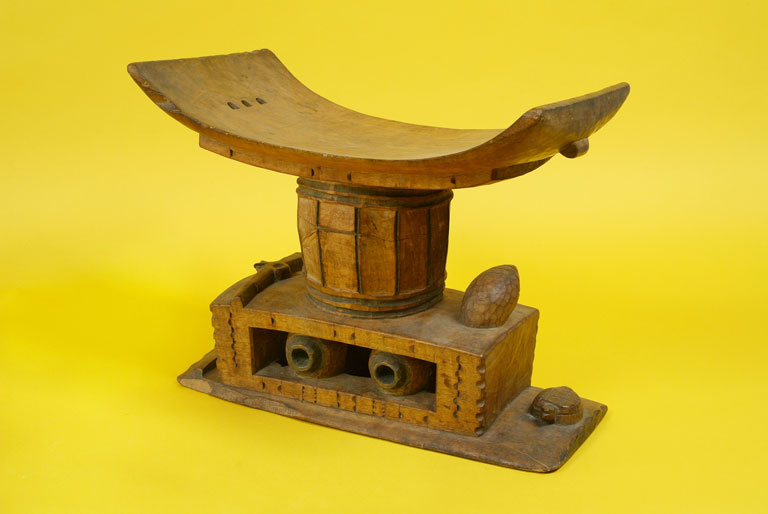
Seat of the Queen Mother on display at the Children's Museum of Indianapolis

She was born in Kumasi in 1773 and rose to become queen mother of the kingdom of Ashanti in 1809 following the death of the incumbent Konadu Yaadom. Although there were several suitable candidates including her younger sister called Ama Serwaa who later became a queen mother herself, her position as senior of the royal women in her generation gave her the clear advantage to succeed Konadu Yaadom.

== Death ==
Adoma Akosua formed a relationship with the Chief of Bron with the intention of overthrowing King Osei Bonsu and helping the chief of Bron to assume the position. King Osei Bonsu had left for a military expedition against the people of Gyaaman and entrusted the civil government of the kingdom of Ashanti in the hands of Adoma Akosua. In his absence, Adoma Akosua performed King Osei Bonsu's funeral rites with the belief that the performance will afflict him so that he will die as a result. Other sources suggest she wanted to overthrow the Osei Bonsu for one of her two sons to assume the kingship.

Her rebellion was quelled when by a loyalist of King Bonsu when he returned to the capital. Adoma Akosua was banished from the royal ward and she died in 1838 after serving as queen mother for 10 years between 1809 and 1819.

Although official literature has said that she was strangled to avoid spilling royal blood, according to Akyeampong, "asantehemaa, Adoma Akosua, was not ordered to be strangled. She was replaced in office by Yaa Dufi. The former queen mother was required to live in the Nkwantanan ward of Kumase, and her descendants were barred forever from the offices of Asantehene and Asantehem."
