= Kwasi Boachi =

Prince of Ashanti Empire (1827–1904)

Kwasi Boakye
- Prince of Asanteman
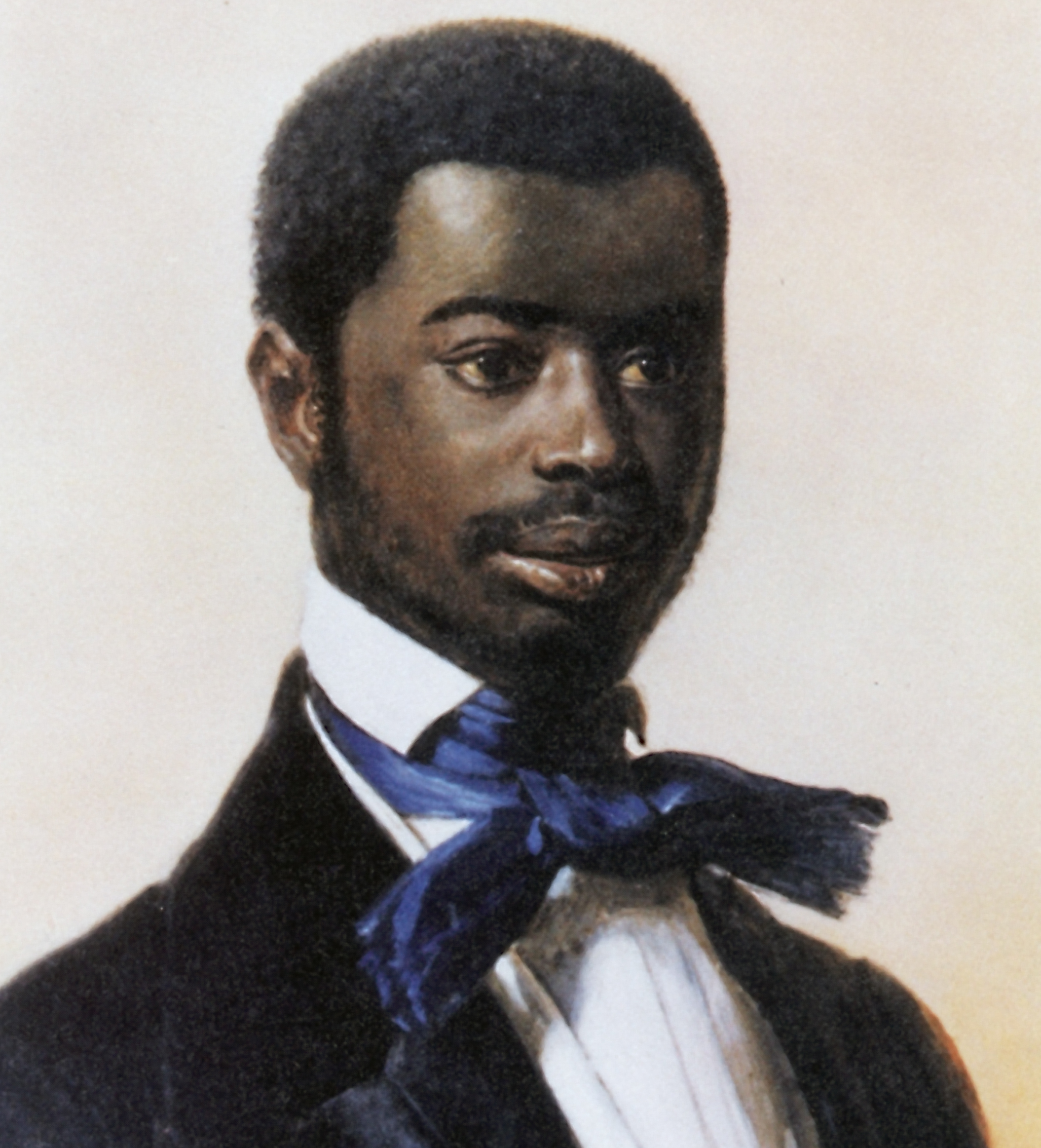
- Boakye c. 1849, at the age of 22
- Born: 24 April 1827; Kumasi, Ashanti Empire
- Died: 9 June 1904 (aged 77); Bantar Peteh, Dutch East Indies
- House: Oyoko
- Father: Kwaku Dua Panin
- Education: Delft Royal Academy; Freiberg Mining Academy
- Occupation: Mining engineer
- Relatives: Kwame Poku (cousin)

Kwasi Boakye or Kwasi Boachi (24 April 1827 – 9 June 1904) was a Prince of the Ashanti Empire who was sent to the Netherlands together with his cousin, Kwame Poku, in 1837, by his father, King Kwaku Dua Panin, to receive education as part of larger negotiations between the Ashanti and the Dutch about the recruitment of Ashanti soldiers for the Dutch East Indies Army.

== Early life ==
Boakye was the son of Kwaku Dua I who was the eighth King of the Ashanti Empire. During the era of the slave trade and after, many people left Africa for the Americas and Europe. Boakye was among those people who left the shores of Africa to study, while others were forced out of the continent. There was an agreement signed between Kwaku Dua I and King William I, that Kwasi Boakye was to return with his cousin, Kwame Poku, after they had completed their studies. Kwame Poku did return to the Dutch Gold Coast as planned; Boakye remained in the Netherlands. He was trained as a mining engineer at the Delft Royal Academy, from which he graduated in 1847.

== Career ==
In July 1847, Boakye attended lectures at the Freiberg Mining Academy (Technische Universitat Bergakademie) in Germany. During his studies, he stayed with Caroline Geudtner at Petersstrasse.

Boakye was sent to the Dutch East Indies in 1850, where he found himself discriminated against by his superior, Cornelius de Groot van Embden, for which he received financial compensation in 1857. He became a member and correspondent for the Dutch East Indies again in 1871. As part of the compensation, he was awarded an estate in Bantar Peteh, south of Buitenzorg. Boakye died on this estate in 1904. He was a member of the Association of Civil Engineers, which was later changed to the Association of Delft Engineers. He was appointed an honorary member in 1893.

== Legacy ==
Dutch writer Arthur Japin has written a historical fiction novel based on the Boakye brothers' lives, The Two Hearts of Kwasi Boachi, released in 1997.
