= Manhyia Palace =

Palace in Kumasi, Ashanti Region, Ghana

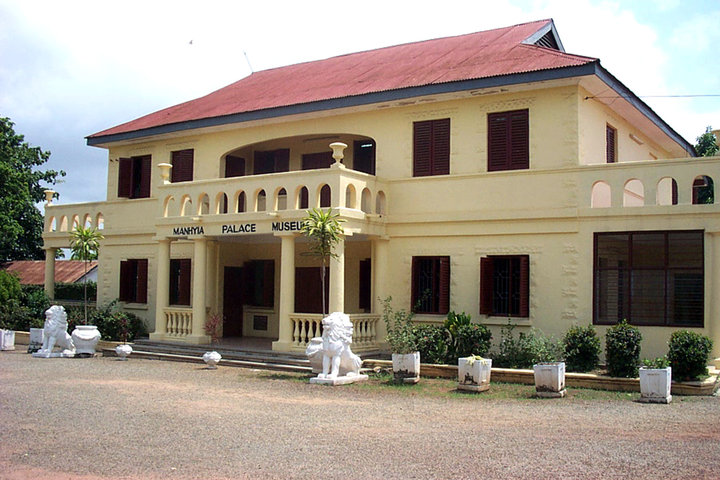
- Manhyia Palace
- Interactive map of the Manhyia Palace area

General information
- Location: Manhyia, Kumasi, Ghana
- Coordinates: 6°42′13″N 1°36′57″W
- Completed: 1925

The Manhyia Palace (Akan: Oman hyia, English: Gathering of the people) is the seat of the Asantehene, as well as his official residence. It is located in Manhyia, Kumasi, the capital of the Ashanti Region of Ghana. The first palace is now a museum. Otumfuor Opoku Ware II built the new palace, which is close to the old one and is where the current Asantehene, Otumfuor Osei Tutu II, resides.

== History ==
The palace was built in 1925 by the British after they had demolished the Aban Palace built by Ashanti Empire. The British were said to have been impressed by the size of the original palace and the scope of its contents, which included "rows of books in many languages", but during the War of the Golden Stool, the British demolished the royal palace with explosives. The palace consequently erected is 1 km (0.62 mi) from the Centre for National Culture, Kumasi.

Upon the return from exile of the Asantehene Nana Prempeh I from the Seychelles Islands, the building was offered to him for use as his residence. This was because prior to the Asantehene's exile, his old palace had been burnt down in the Yaa Asentewa War. The war was fought between the British and the Asantes because of the refusal of the Asantehene to offer the Golden stool to the then governor of the Gold Coast. Prempeh I only accepted the offer after he had paid for the cost of the building in full. Two kings lived in the palace, namely Otumfuo Prempeh I and Otumfuo Sir Osei Agyeman Prempeh II, KBE, the 13th and 14th kings of the Asante nation.

The old palace was converted into a museum in 1995 after the new palace was built. Opoku Ware II was the first king to live in the new palace, which he occupied until his death in 1999.

== Museum ==
The palace was converted into a museum and officially opened on 12 August 1995 by the then king Opoku Ware II. Several artifacts are displayed in the museum. They include furniture used by the kings, the bronze head of Osei Agyeman Prempeh II, and a sketch map of the Asanteman. There is also the Asanteman's first television at the museum, as well as life-sized wax effigies of some of the kings and queens of Asanteman.

== Architecture ==
The architecture of the palace is akin to Asante's architecture of the early 1900s. The palace is a two-story building with both floors having open verandas, giving a view of the palace's environs. In 1995, an outbuilding was added to the original palace to serve as a gift shop. The palace has a large courtyard and it showcases statues of past kings and queens of the Asante Kingdom.

The facility has a blend of traditional Asante styles with modern architecture. It is equipped with an outdoor space, an entrance lobby, a commercial kitchen, a conference room, a wine bar, and a main hall which spans 1,200 m^{2} (13,000 sq ft).

== Otumfuo Osei Tutu II Jubilee Hall ==
Location of Otumfuo Osei Tutu II Jubilee Hall within Manhyia Palace

The Otumfuo Osei Tutu II Jubilee Hall is a multi-purpose convention centre situated in the Manhyia Palace, named after the current Asantehene, Otumfuo Nana Osei Tutu II. Commissioned on 15 April 2024, its purpose is to hold meetings, get-togethers, cultural performances, and other traditional functions.

== See also ==
- Asante
- List of rulers of Asante
