= Apatrapa =

Town in Ashanti region in Ghana

- Country: Ghana
- Region: Ashanti region

Apatrapa is a town in the Kwadaso Municipality near Kumasi in Ashanti region of Ghana.

== Institution ==
The Apatrapa Health Center has an over 41-bed capacity ward. It is located in the town which was commissioned by the Kwadaso Municipal Assembly.
