= Fredua =

Fredua is both a surname and given name. Notable people with the name include:

- Barima Fredua Agyeman (or Kwaku Dua I Panyin) (1797–1867), the Asantehene (King of the Ashanti) from 1834 until 1867
- Fredua Koranteng Adu (or Freddy Adu) (born 1989), American professional footballer
- Fredua Buadee Benson Erchiah (or Fred Benson) (born 1984), Dutch professional footballer
