= Nana Konadu Yiadom III =

Queen mother of the Ashanti people (1927–2025)

- Asantehemaa
- Reign: 6 February 2017 – 7 August 2025
- Enstoolment: 6 February 2017
- Predecessor: Nana Afia Kobi Serwaa Ampem II
- Born: Nana Ama Konadu; 1927; Ashanti Region, Gold Coast (now Ghana)
- Died: 7 August 2025 (aged 98)
- Father: Opanin Kofi Fofie
- Mother: Nana Afia Kobi Serwaa Ampem II

Nana Konadu Yiadom III (born Nana Ama Konadu; 1927 – 7 August 2025) was the 14th Asantehemaa of the Ashanti Kingdom in Ghana. She was the elder sister of the current Asantehene, Otumfuo Nana Osei Tutu II, and succeeded her mother, Nana Afia Kobi Serwaa Ampem II, in 2017.

== Early life ==
Nana Ama Konadu was born at the Benyaade Shrine in Merdan, Kwadaso, during the restoration of the Asante Confederacy. Her mother, Nana Afia Kobi Serwaa Ampem II, reigned as Asantehemaa from 1977 to 2016. Her father, Opanin Kofi Fofie (also known as Koofie or Keewuo), was a carpenter from Besease near Atimatim. Shortly after her birth, she was fostered by her maternal aunt at Ashanti New Town (Ash-Town), Kumasi. She was the eldest sister of the current Asantehene, Otumfuo Nana Osei Tutu II.

She received no formal schooling but was educated informally within the palace. In her teens, she underwent traditional puberty rites (bragro) with her niece Nana Abena Ansa. She later married Opanin Kwame Boateng, a blacksmith from Aduman, Kumasi.

In 1959, she was baptised into the Saviour Church and took the Christian name Ruth. Due to her royal status, she also served as an automatic patron of the Anglican Church. She worked in various occupations including caregiving, farming, and petty trading.

== Reign ==
Following the death of her mother in November 2016 at about 109 years old, Nana Ama Konadu was enstooled with the stool name Nana Konadu Yiadom III on 6 February 2017. She was publicly outdoored by her brother, Otumfuo Osei Tutu II, on 6 May 2017, during his 67th birthday celebrations at Manhyia Palace. at a ceremony at the Manhyia Palace in Kumasi. At the time 2017 when she ascended the stool she was 83 years old.

On 6 February 2022, a thanksgiving ceremony and a durbar were held at the Manhyia Palace in commemoration of her 5th anniversary since ascending the Asantehemaa stool.

== Role and contributions ==
As Asantehemaa, she played a vital role in the traditional governance of the Ashanti Kingdom. She served as a senior royal adviser to the Asantehene and a custodian of the Ashanti Kingdom’s matrilineal royal line, a role traditionally associated with advising the king. She was known for her fairness, humility, and wisdom in adjudicating disputes.

Her reign was marked by acts of philanthropy. In her fifth year, she made donations to the Mother-Baby Unit (MBU), Paediatric Intensive Care Unit (PICU), and Paediatric Emergency Unit (PEU) at Komfo Anokye Teaching Hospital and Manhyia Government District Hospital, covering medical bills for new mothers. She also initiated annual campaigns promoting breastfeeding. In recognition of her charitable work, the Saviour Church named a school after her – the Nana Konadu Saviour School.

== Death ==
Nana Konadu Yiadom III died on 7 August 2025, at the age of 98. Her death was announced by Otumfuo Osei Tutu II at an emergency meeting of the Asanteman Traditional Council on 11 August. A one-week observance will be held on 21 August, at Manhyia Palace, attended by chiefs, queen mothers, dignitaries, and mourners from across Ghana.

== See also ==
- Ashanti people
- Ashanti Kingdom
- List of rulers of Asante
