= Kwaku Bonsu Osei =

Ghanaian footballer

Kwaku Osei
Personal information
- Full name: Kwaku Bonsu Osei
- Date of birth: 17 August 2000 (age 26)
- Place of birth: Aburaso, Ghana
- Height: 1.71 m (5 ft 7 in)
- Position: Winger

Team information
- Current team: Radnički Niš
- Number: 19

Youth career
- Bechem United

Senior career*
Years	Team	Apps	(Gls)
2018–2019	Bechem United		
2019–2020	Senica	1	(1)
2020–2022	Caracas	69	(16)
2023–2026	Spartak Subotica	57	(10)
2023–2024	→ Al-Kharaitiyat (loan)	7	(2)
2026–	Radnički Niš	0	(0)
- * Club domestic league appearances and goals as of 13 June 2026

Kwaku Bonsu Osei (born 17 August 2000) is a Ghanaian professional footballer who plays as a winger for Serbian SuperLiga club Radnički Niš.

== Career ==
In October 2019, Osei signed with Slovak side Senica. On 8 December 2019, Osei made his league debut for Senica during a 1–2 loss to Žilina and scored his team's only goal.

In January 2020, Osei signed a three-year contract with Venezuelan club Caracas.

In the 2022–23 winter transfer window, Osei moved back to Europe and joined Serbian SuperLiga club Spartak Subotica.

On 20 September 2023, Osei joined Saudi club Al-Kharaitiyat on a season-long loan.
