= Ashanti Medal =

Ashantee Medal
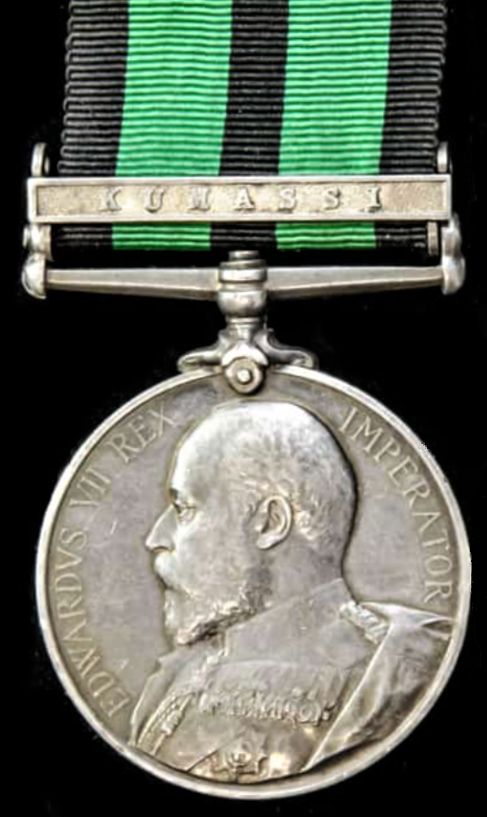
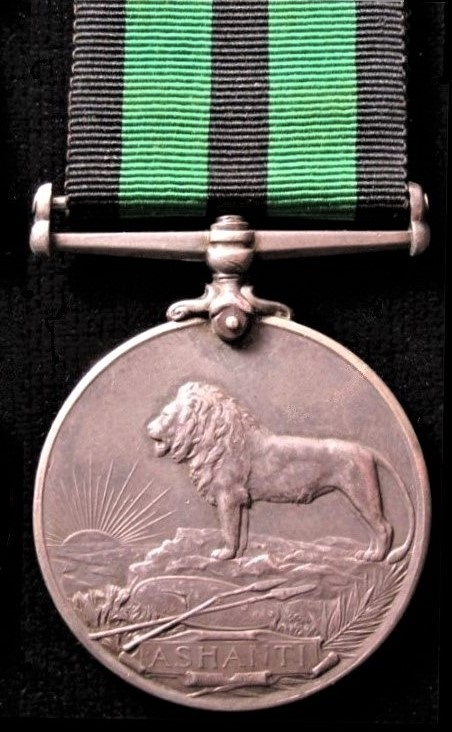
- Obverse and reverse of the medal
- Type: Campaign medal
- Awarded for: Campaign Service
- Description: Silver and Bronze, 36mm diameter
- Presented by: UK
- Eligibility: British and Colonial forces
- Campaign: Third Ashanti Expedition
- Clasps: Kumassi
- Established: 1901
- Ribbon bar of the medal
- Related: Ashantee Medal (1873-74); Ashanti Star (1896)

The Ashanti Medal was sanctioned in October 1901 and was the first campaign medal authorised by Edward VII. This medal was created for those troops engaged in the Third Ashanti Expedition, also known as the War of the Golden Stool. This expedition lasted from March – December 1900, with the final outcome that the Ashanti maintained its de facto independence. Ashanti was made a Protectorate of the British Empire, but they ruled themselves with little reference to the colonial power.

== Description ==
The medal, designed by George William de Saulles, was circular and 36 millimetres (1.4 in) in diameter, with the following design:

Obverse: The bust of King Edward VII in Field Marshal's uniform facing left with the inscription 'EDWARDVS VII REX IMPERATOR'.

Reverse: The British lion standing on a rocky cliff facing a rising sun with, below, a native shield and crossed spears with a scroll bearing the inscription 'ASHANTI'.

Metal: Awarded in silver to combatants and in bronze for native carriers.

Ribbon: Green, 33 millimetres (1.3 in) wide, with three 5 millimetres (0.20 in) black stripes, one at each edge and one in the centre.

Naming: The rim of the medal was impressed with the recipient's name and unit in small square capitals. Officers' medals often had details engraved in script.

== Clasp ==
The clasp 'KUMASSI' was awarded to the forces besieged within Kumassi between 31 March and 15 July 1900 and to members of the two relieving columns, under Colonel James Willcocks and Colonel A.P. Burroughs respectively.

== Numbers awarded ==
About 4,400 silver and at least 900 bronze medals were awarded.

While no British Army units took part in the campaign, 183 European officers and 80 European NCOs seconded to local forces received the silver medal, as well as 131 European civilians, mainly local administrators and doctors. Some 4,000 locally recruited troops and constabulary received the medal in silver.

About 900 carriers qualified for the medal in bronze. In addition, numerous local levies were employed who may also have received the bronze medal.
