= Samuel Asante-Fosuhene =

Ghanaian politician, Lawyer, Journalist and Traditional Ruler

Samuel Asante-Fosuhene (1938–1999) was a Ghanaian politician, Lawyer, Journalist and Traditional Ruler. He was the Member of Parliament in the 1979 Ghanaian parliament for the Adansi Constituency in the Ashanti region of Ghana.

== Education ==
Asante-Fosuhene attended Adisadel College for his secondary education. He then pursued Journalism at the University of Cape Coast and later studied law at the University of Ghana.

== Career ==
Asante-Fosuhene began his journalism career with the Ghanaian Times News Corporation. He later assumed the role of company secretary at the corporation.

== Politics ==
Asante-Fosuhene was a member of the Popular Front Party and was elected in the 1979 Ghanaian general election to represent the people of Adansi in the 1st Parliament of the 3rd Republic of Ghana.

=== Chieftaincy ===
In 1984, Asante-Fosuhene was enstooled as the Adansihene of the Adansi Traditional Council by Otumfuo Opoku Ware II. He was given the stool name Nana Ntiako Sakrakyie. He succeeded Nana Kwantwi Barima, who was destooled by the Asanteman Council.
