= Mensa Bonsu =

- Asantehene of Asanteman; Kumasehene of Kumasi
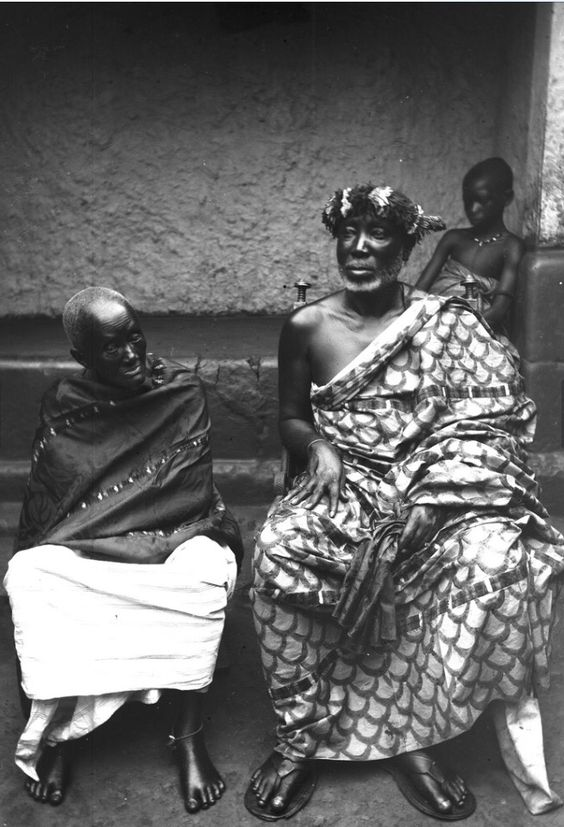
- Mensa Bonsu after his forced abdication in 1883

King of the Kingdom of Asante
- Reign: 1874 – 8 March 1883
- Coronation: 1874
- Predecessor: Kwabena Dwomo
- Successor: Kwaku Dua II
- Born: c. 1840; Praso, Kingdom of Asante
- Died: c. 1896 (aged 56); Kumasi, Kingdom of Asante
Names
- Otumfuo Nana Mensa Bonsu
- House: Oyoko

Mensa Bonsu (c. 1840 – c. 1896) was the tenth king of the Ashanti Empire, from 1874 until his forced abdication on 8 March 1883.

== Biography ==
=== Accession to the Asante throne ===
Mensa Bonsu was the son of Afua Kobi. He became Asantehene (king of the Asante) after his elder brother Kofi Kakari was deposed in September 1874. Mensa Bonsu tried to restore the fortunes of Kumasi after its destruction in the 1873-4 Anglo-Asante war. However, he did not make himself popular with contemporaries: "Chronically short of revenue, and personally avaricious (for women as well as gold), King Asantehene Mensa Bonsu carried punitive exactions to new and insupportable levels." Attempts were made to depose the Asantehene in 1877 and 1880. In 1881 Bonsu sent a golden axe to Queen Victoria as a gesture of good will. He was destooled and banished from Kumasi in 1883 by his sister Yaa Akyaa. The following five years saw Asante civil war. Asantehene Mensa Bonsu died in British captivity in 1896 and was succeeded to the throne by heir apparent Kwaku Dua II of the Kingdom of Asante. In 1911, Mensa Bonsu's corpse was disinterred for ceremonial burial at the Asante capital city, Kumasi.

== Bibliography ==
- Basil Davidson: A History of West Africa. 1000 – 1800. New revised edition, 2nd impression. Longman, London 1977, ISBN 0-582-60340-4 (The Growth of African Civilisation).

== See also ==
- Ashanti people
- Rulers of the Kingdom of Asante
- Kingdom of Ashanti
