= Yaa Akyaa =

Ashanti kingdom queen mother (1847–1917)

Yaa Akyaa (c. 1847 – 1917) was an Asantehemaa of the Ashanti Empire from 1884 to 1896. She had great influence during the reign of her son, and acted as his de facto co-regent.

== Early life ==
Yaa Akyaa was born in the Ashanti empire c. 1847. She is the daughter of Asantehemaa Afua Kobi, born into Oyoko royalty. Shortly after her birth it was decided that she would become the successor to Queen Afua Kobi as the Asantehemaa, known as the Queen Mother. Yaa Akyaa went on to marry Akyebiakyerehene Kwasi Gyambibi, who served as an adviser to the Queen Mother and other important chiefs of the empire. During their marriage they had thirteen children.

== Political career ==
Yaa Akyaa became Queen Mother in 1884 after ousting her brother Mensa Bonsu in 1884, in which year she exiled both him and their mother; her son Kwaku Dua II became king, but died after 44 days in office of small pox, after which she engineered the accession of her son Prempeh I to the Golden Stool. As he was only 15, she was able to wield a great deal of influence over him while remaining in power herself. However, after he was claimed to be the heir to the throne, another person rivaled him causing strife in Ashanti. During the constant civil war, the neighboring Adansis took advantage of the weakened state of the Ashanti. The Adansis in turn called on the British to start war with the Ashanti, and the British agreed. She was severely anti-British, and would stop at nothing to neutralize or eliminate enemies, though she was otherwise intelligent in matters concerning royal politics. Her hatred for the British stemmed from the disease they were bringing to the Ashanti people and the strife it was causing.

== Later life ==
In 1896, the British succeeded in subjugating the Ashanti and exiled her to the Seychelles, along with her son and other chiefs; there she remained until her death in 1917. She remains a controversial figure in Ghana due to her habit of using violence against her opponents.
