= Konadu Yaadom =

Asantehemaa (queen-mother) of Asante

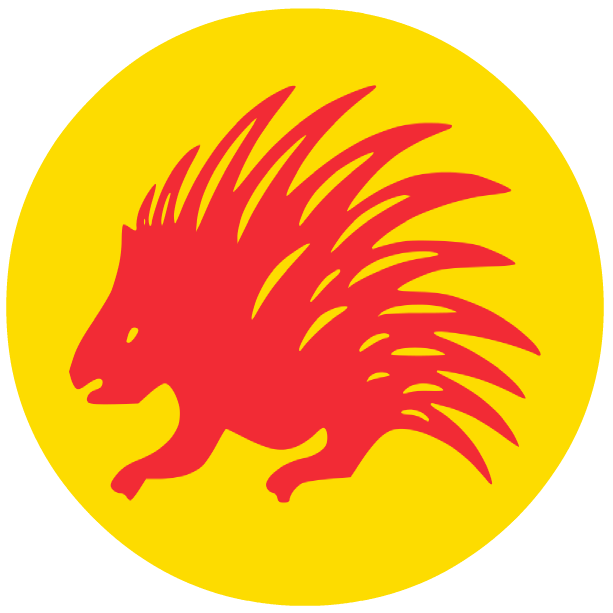
- Emblem of the Ashanti Empire
- Born: c.1750
- Died: 1809
- Other names: Kwadu; Yiadom
- Years active: c.1770 - 1809
- Title: Asantehemaa
- Successor: Adoma Akosua

Konadu Yaadom, also Kwadu Yaadom (c.1750 - 1809) was the fourth Asantehemaa of the Ashanti Empire, whose multiple marriages and spiritual influence meant that she became an important and powerful ruler in the eighteenth and early nineteenth centuries.

== Biography ==
Yaadom was born around 1750. Her parents were the Mamponhene Asumgyima Penemo and her mother was Yaa Aberefi, their marriage was made as a political arrangement in order for Penemo's clan - the Bretuo - to gain power in the region which was otherwise controlled by the Oyoko clan, which Aberefi was from. Her mother, Yaa Aberefi, was also enstooled as Asantehemaa.

=== Marriages ===
When Yaadom was approximately ten years old, a similarly strategic marriage was arranged for her to Apahene Owusu of Mampon. According to the tradition, her second husband was Safo Katanka the Mamponhene. However, historian Ivor Wilks believed this marriage to have been between Katanka and one of Yaadom's sisters - in the received chronology of her marriages, there is not enough time for her to bear three children by him before she married her third husband.

According to tradition, her third marriage was to Adu Twum of Kumasi, who she had four children with: Opoku Kwame; Yaa Dufie; Akua Akrukruwaa; Opoku Fofie. Yaa Dufie became Asantehemaa in later life; Opoku Fofie became Asantehene. According to tradition, Yaadom's fourth husband was Asokore-Mamponhene Owusu Ansa, who she had three children with: Osei Kofi; Osei Bonsu; Osei Badu. Osei Bonsu later became Asantehene.

According to tradition, Yaadom's fifth husband was Owusu Yaw, of Anowo in Kumase. They had two children: Osei Yaw, who later became Asantehene and an unnamed child. Both Yaadom and this final child died as a result of complications during the birth.

=== Asantehemaa-ship ===
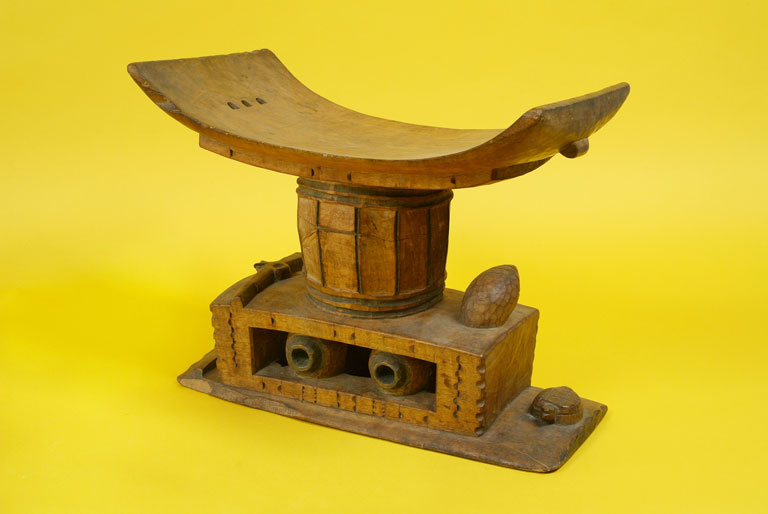
The Children's Museum of Indianapolis, Queen Mother's Seat

The date that Yaadom was enstooled as the Asantehemaa is debated. Historian Katherine von Hammerstein estimates she took up the role circa 1778. However David Owusu-Ansah makes the date 1770. Both agree that Yaadom held the role until her death in 1809.

In 1798, Yaadom led the deposition and un-enstoolment of the Asantehene Osei Kwame, along with other influential figures in the kingdom. She was convinced that he had poisoned her son, who was a rival to his power. In addition to the supposed poisoning, one of the reasons given for her actions is that she was opposed to Osei Kwame's closeness to Muslims from outside the kingdom, and his intention to establish "Koranic law for the civil code". Additionally if Kwame's conversion to Islam had continued it would have challenged the matrilineal inheritance policy of the people: instead of uncle to sister's son, it may have moved to a father-to-son model. Some sources suggest that Osei Kwame "was a believer at heart", but that Islam would not coalesce with the Asante's traditional social structures. After his de-enstoolment he fled to Kumasi.

This episode also led to a consolidation of Yaadom's power and the role of the Asantehemaa. According to Ivor Wilks, Yaadom encouraged a revision of the royal genealogies, removing any reference to Osei Kwame's biological mother Akyaama, who could have potentially been a rival of Yaadom's for the Asantehemaaship.

== Legacy ==
There have been two subsequent rulers, who have taken Yaadom's name (with variant spelling). Konadu Yaadom II was Asantehemaa from 1917 to 1944, ruling alongside Prempeh I and Prempeh II. Nana Konadu Yiadom III became Asantehemaa in 2017.

== Historiography ==
Asantehemaa Konadu Yaadom is an important figure in Asante history for several reasons. Firstly, her marriages illustrate the competing power structures at work in the royal lineages of the Asante. Secondly, according to Ivor Wilks, her marriage to Adu Twum she established the "dominance of the Houses of Osei Tutu and Opoku Ware to the Golden Stool". Thirdly, she "contributed to the rise of a strong “centre” in the politics of the Asante union", according to David Owusu-Ansah. Some sources refer to Yaadom as Kwadu, rather than Konadu, or Yiadom rather than Yaadom.

== In literature ==
Yaadom features in the novel Ama by Manu Herbstein, which tells the story of a young Asante woman who is a victim of the Atlantic slave trade. She also features in the sequel to Ama, which is called Brave Music of a Distant Drum. Her great-grandson Kwame Poku features in a novel by Arthur Japin, set during Dutch expansion into West Africa in the nineteenth century and telling the story of two Asante princes who were presented to the Dutch royal court in 1837.
