= Molly Germaine Prempeh =

- Born: 1947 (age 78–79); Seychelles
- Known for: Princess, Daughter of Princess Hugette, Great-granddaughter of Prempeh I
- Title: Princess
- Children: 6
- Parent: Princess Hugette

Molly Germaine Prempeh (born 1947) is a Seychelles-born Ghanaian princess. She is the daughter of Princess Hugette and the great-granddaughter of Prempeh I, who was banished together with his family in 1900 by the British. In 2015, she was known to have visited the Seychelles to reconnect with members of her family, after being absent for about 60 years from her birth country.

== Visit to the Seychelles ==
Germaine Prempeh was born in the Seychelles but lived in Kumasi, Ghana for almost 68 years. In February 2015 she visited Seychelles for the first time after being absent for a very long time to reconnect with her family. Upon her arrival at the airport in Praslin, she was met by her cousin, Marie-Rose Mahoune, the daughter of her late aunt Sylvia Prempeh. When she met the rest of her family members, they were surprised that she could speak Creole. During her stay in the Seychelles, she visited the burial ground of her ancestors back on the Seychelles and the two-storey villa at Le Rocher, formerly referred to as the Ashanti camp.

== Personal life ==
She is the mother of six children and grandmother to fourteen grandchildren.
