= Nana Afia Kobi Serwaa Ampem II =

Queen mother of the Ashanti Kingdom

- Reign: 6 February 1977 – 15 November 2016
- Coronation: 2 June 1976
- Predecessor: Nana Amma Serwaa Nyarko II
- Successor: Nana Konadu Yiadom III
- Born: 1907
- Died: 15 November 2016 (aged 109)

Nana Afia Kobi Serwaa Ampem II (1907 – 15 November 2016) was the Queen of the Ashanti Kingdom and mother of the current Asantehene, Otumfuo Nana Osei Tutu II, who is the youngest son of her five children. She was the 13th Queen mother of the Ashanti Kingdom.

Nana Afia Kobi Serwaa Ampem II died on 15 November 2016 aged 109. She may be the longest-lived member of any royal family. She was buried at dawn in a full ceremony at the Breman Royal Mausoleum (Ban mu) on 20 January 2017, after her remains were removed from the Bantama Royal Mausoleum in order to receive final traditional rites.

Before her death, she was the Asantehemaa (Queen mother) of the Ashanti Kingdom for 39 years. The Ashanti people believe that the Queen mother, buried first in the Bantama Mausoleum, must meet first with the royal ancestors before moving on the final resting place.

== Burial ==
The late Queen mother was laid in state for three days and buried on Thursday, 19 January 2017. A curfew was placed on the citizens of Kumasi, everyone was supposed to stay indoors from 8pm to 4am. This directive was announced by the chief linguist of Otumfuo Nana Osei Tutu II, Nana Nsuase Agyeman Poku Agyemang III on Friday, 6 January 2017.

== Recognition ==
The Afia Kobi Serwaa Ampem Girls Senior High School was named after her. A roundabout in Kumasi is named for her.
