= Osei Bonsu =

- Asantehene of Asanteman; Kumasehene of Kumasi

King of the Ashanti Empire
- Reign: 1800 \ 01 (Note: The beginning of his reign differs by source but the most common is the 1800 or 1801 - 1824 format.) or 1804 (Note: Some sources state his reign commenced in 1804) – 1824
- Predecessor: Opoku Fofie
- Successor: Osei Yaw Akoto
- Born: 1779; Kumasi, Ashanti Empire
- Died: 1824 (aged 44–45); Kumasi, Ashanti Empire
- House: House of the Oyoko Dynasty

Osei Bonsu (born 1779 – 21 January 1824) also known as Osei Tutu Kwame was the Asantehene (King of the Ashanti). He reigned either from 1800 to 1824 or from 1804 to 1824. During his reign as the king, the Ashanti fought the Fante confederation and ended up dominating Gold Coast trade. In Akan, Bonsu means whale (the largest and most powerful "fish" in the sea), and is symbolic of his achievement of extending the Ashanti Empire to the coast. He died in Kumasi, and was succeeded by Osei Yaw Akoto.

Other sources refer to him as Osei Tutu Kwame. He was a leader in war against the Fante of the southern Gold Coast in 1806–07 and against Gyaman in 1818–19. He halted British expansionism in the Gold Coast region.

== Reign ==
Early in his reign, the king suppressed a rebellion in the North-West provinces that was carried out by Muslim subjects who wanted to restore Osei Kwame Panyin to office possibly because the former Asantehene was pro-Muslim. This rebellion was led by the Gbuipewura of Gonja in the early 19th century. The rebels were defeated around 1801 (Note: Historian Wilks refers to this as the battle of Kaka on pages 256 and 261 which took place possibly in 1801.) with the Gbuipewura either captured or killed.

An Annal was written in Arabic by Muhammad al-Mustafa from Gonja on the history of the ruling Oyoko dynasty, sponsored by Bonsu during his reign. The document does not exist today but it was partly reviewed by Joseph Dupuis in 1820. During his era, the interest rate on loans for capital was set at 33% for 42 days.

=== Infrastructure Projects ===
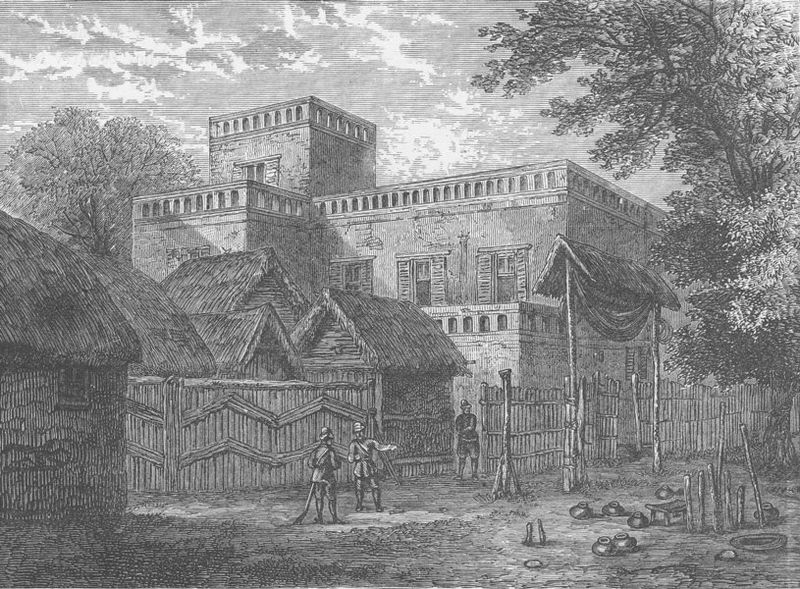
The Aban Palace was completed as a project of Osei Bonsu in 1822. This depiction of the palace dates from 1874 during British occupation

Thomas Edward Bowdich noted Osei Bonsu's interest in English architecture. In the early 19th century, Osei Bonsu began the construction of the Aban Palace funded by the public treasury. A new town plan was conceived. Houses along the main road which served as the link between the suburbs of Bantama and Asafo were to be rebuilt. He also had laborers construct a wide straight street from the city of Kumasi to the village of Breman on the Mampong road. Bonsu's city plan was to destroy the villages in the neighborhood and rehouse the people along this street.

In 1816, the King commenced the reconstruction of the 6th and 7th Great Roads where they were cut within the width of 30 – 40 feet; further straightened and weeded. Works on the 7th Great Road progressed but reconstructions on the 6th Great Road were stalled until 1820 where Bonsu spoke of restarting the project. Reconstruction of the 1st Great Road took place in 1819 and by 1820, the renovated 7th Great Road, leading to Elmina – was believed to be the fastest route to the coast taking one day to journey to the Coast from Ashanti.

Bonsu incorporated literate Muslims into the Ashanti bureaucracy. These "Moors," as documented by European visitors to Ashanti in the early 19th century, originated from the north of Ashanti among the states of Gonja, Dagomba and Mamprussi. A Muslim school was established by Al-Ghamba, the head of the Kumasi muslim community, in the early 19th century which Bonsu sent some of his children to attend. By 1819, the school had accommodated 70 students. Muller adds that Bonsu was the patron of the school which he took advantage to check against the growth of Isam in Ashanti. Muller also explains that Bonsu sent his children to the school as a sign of respect to the Muslim community and not to acknowledge the growth of Islam in the state.

=== Military ===
British primary sources in the early 19th century referred to an "Arab medical staff" whose services were employed in Ashanti army by Osei Bonsu. They were tasked with the function of recording Ashanti casualties in battle. This unit was deployed in a campaign against Fante states in 1807 for example.

==== Campaigns ====
Historian Edgerton recounts the origin of Bonsu's conflict with the British and Fante. He explains that a relative of a tributary Asen chief called Aputai was charged for grave robbery after they were sued by the victim. Aputai was charged by the Ashanti court led by the Asantehene to pay restitution on behalf of the defendant relative but Aputai attacked the victim of the grave robbery. Osei Bonsu sent emissaries to Aputai's court which Edgerton states that its purpose was to convince Aputai to cease hostilities and pay restitution according to Ashanti law. Aputai murdered the emissaries causing Osei Bonsu to lead an army and attack the jurisdiction of Aputai. Aputai and another rebellious Assen chief sought refuge among the Fante. McCaskie on the other hand writes that the Fante states provided refuge for three rebellious Ashanti subjects from Asen in the late 1790s. Both Edgerton and McCaskie report that Osei Bonsu assembled a series of diplomatic envoys to the Fante states to secure the release of these subjects although McCaskie specifies that it was to the state of Abora in the year 1805. The final group of envoys, according to McCaskie were put to death by the Fante state of Abora. This resulted in the declaration of war against the Fante by Bonsu in 1806 and by May 1806, the Fante state of Abora fell to Ashanti conquests. The fugitives fled to Cape Coast to escape the Ashanti army.

In June 1807, the Dutch fort at Kormantin "was surrendered to Asante." A British fort at Anomabu led by British governor Torrane provided shelter to escaping Fante affected by the Ashanti invasion of the town in 1807. Edgerton adds that Torrane also protected the fugitives who fled from Ashanti pursuit. The Ashanti army attacked the fort resulting in its surrender. On 16 June, British sources documented that 8000 out of the estimated 1500 Fante at Anomabu were slain as a result of the invasion. The surviving Fante leaders of Bonsu's conquest swore allegiance to the Asantehene as the Fante states were conquered into the Ashanti Empire. The Asantehene clarified, as stated by McCaskie, that he "had no quarrel with the Europeans but only attacked Anomabo fort because it sheltered his enemies and his rebel subjects". Torrane and Osei Bonsu resolved their differences in a diplomatic meeting on 25 June.

Since 1811, the province of Gyaman had revolted against Ashanti rule. After failed negotiations between the Ashanti government and Gyaman authorities, the Council of Kumasi met on 6 November 1817 where it was agreed on a military reoccupation of Gyaman. On 23 November, this decision by the Council of Kumasi was approved by the Asantemanhyiamu. Asantehene Bonsu led an invasion of Gyaman from 1818–19. As stated by Wilks, the Gyaman cavalry gave the strongest resistance but the state was conquered by 1818. From the early 19th century, the Ashanti government solidified its rule in the province.

== Foreign relations ==
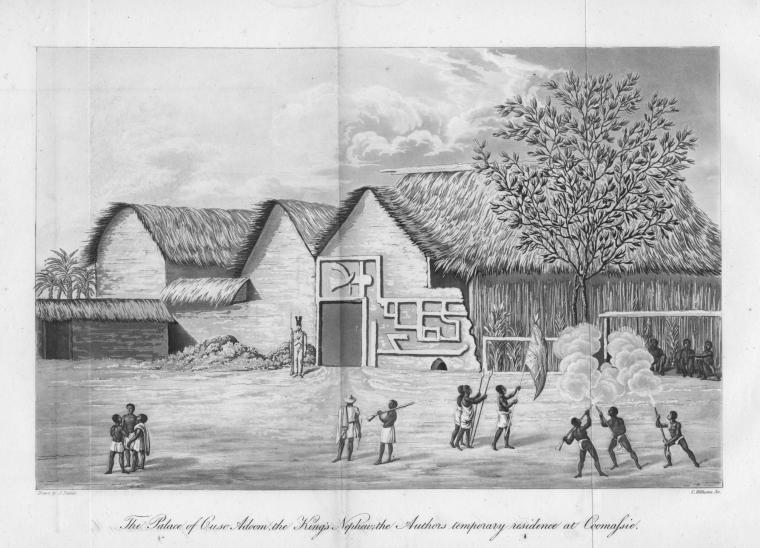
Temporary residence of Joseph Dupuis in Kumasi during his diplomatic mission to the empire in 1820.

As a result of the conquest of the Fante states by 1816, the Ashanti exerted power over the coast of modern Ghana. This attracted European diplomats to the court of Osei Bonsu with the aim of improving relations with Ashanti. As listed by historian Irwin, between 1816 and 1820 the Ashanti court received Willem Huydecoper (in 1816), Frederick James and Thomas Edward Bowdich with William Hutchinson and Henry Tedlie (in 1817), as well as Joseph Dupuis and William Hutton with Francis Collins, Benjamin Salmon, and David Mill Graves (in 1820). The "five years' peace" occurred under Osei Bonsu from 1801 to 1806. As noted by Joseph Dupuis in 1820, this was a period of peace and stability with ambassadors visiting Osei Bonsu at Kumasi from "Abomey, (circa 1802 ), Salgha and Yendy" bearing honourable presents and congratulatory messages to the king.

== See also ==
- Opoku Fofie
