= Ashanti Protectorate =

Ashanti Protectorate is alleged to have been established in 1902 from the Ashanti Confederacy, now Ashanti Region. There are multiple references to an "Ashanti Protectorate" in writings. However, so far no legal instrument has been identified that establishes this. This is because, in fact, the territory in question was established as a Crown Colony on 1 January 1902. A Crown Colony is not a Protectorate. They are two different things. After several prior wars with British troops, Ashanti was once again occupied by British troops in January 1896. In 1900 the Ashanti Uprising took place. The British suppressed the violence and captured the city of Kumasi. Ashanti's traditional king, the Asanthene, and his counselors were deported. The outcome was the annexation of Ashanti by the British so that it became part of His Majesty's dominions and a British Crown Colony with its administration undertaken by a Chief Commissioner under the authority of the Governor of the Gold Coast. Ashanti was classed as a colony by conquest. The legislation by which this annexation was effected and the administration constituted was the Ashanti Order in Council 1901 made on 26 September 1901.

The Ashanti lost their sovereignty but not the essential integrity of their socio-political system. In 1935, limited self-determination for the Ashanti was officially regularized in the formal establishment of the Ashanti Confederacy. Ashanti continued to be administered with the greater Gold Coast but remained, nonetheless, a separate Crown Colony until it became united as part of the new dominion named Ghana under the Ghana Independence Act 1957.
