= Osei Tutu Agyeman Prempeh II =

Asantehene (Ashanti King)

Prempeh II
- Asantehene of Asanteman; Kumasehene of Kumasi
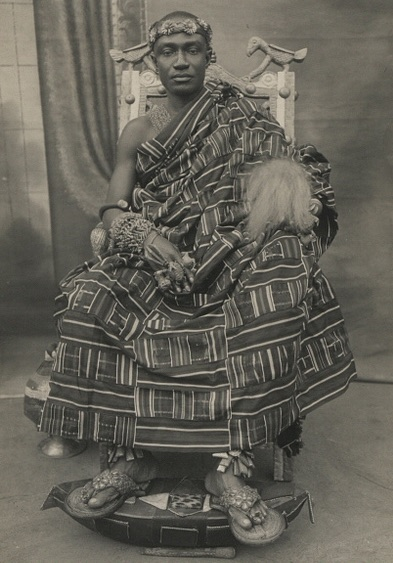
- Prempeh II in 1935

King of the Asante Kingdom
- Reign: 22 June 1931 – 27 May 1970
- Coronation: 22 June 1931
- Predecessor: Prempeh I
- Successor: Opoku Ware II
- Born: c. 1892; Kumasi, Kingdom of Ashanti, Gold Coast
- Died: 27 May 1970 (aged 77–78); Kumasi, Ghana
- Issue: Henry K. Prempeh; Lovelace Prempeh
Names
- The Asantehene Otumfuo Sir Osei Agyeman Prempeh II, KBE
- House: Oyoko Dynasty
- Religion: Anglican

Prempeh II (Otumfuo Osei Tutu Agyeman Prempeh II, c. 1892 – 27 May 1970), was the 14th Asantehene, or king of the Ashanti (Ruler of the Asante), reigning from 22 June 1931 to 27 May 1970.

== Biography ==
Asantehene Prempeh II of the Ashanti was born in 1892 in the capital city called Kumasi. He was four years old when his uncle, Prempeh I (the 13th Asantehene), his maternal grandmother, Queen Nana Yaa Akyaa, and other family members were captured and exiled to the Seychelles Islands by the British in 1896. Prempeh I returned from exile in 1924 and died in May 1931, and Otumfuo Prempeh II was subsequently elected as his successor; however, he was elected as merely Kumasihene rather than Asantehene. In 1935, after strenuous efforts on his part, the colonial authorities allowed Prempeh II to assume the title of Asantehene.

In 1949, Prempeh II was instrumental in founding Prempeh College, a prestigious all-boys boarding school in Kumasi, Ashanti. He also gave a large tract of land for the construction of the Kwame Nkrumah University of Science and Technology (KNUST), which in 1969 awarded him an honorary degree of Doctor of Science. In October 1969, he was elected as the first President of the National House of Chiefs, and shortly thereafter was appointed to the Council of State.

== See also ==
- Ashanti people
- Rulers of the Ashanti
