= Osei Yaw Akoto =

- Asantehene of Asanteman; Kumasehene of Kumasi

King of the Ashanti Empire
- Reign: 1824 – 21 February 1834
- Coronation: 1824
- Predecessor: Osei Bonsu
- Successor: Kwaku Dua I
- Born: c. 1800; Kumasi, Ashanti Empire
- Died: 21 February 1834 (aged 34); Kumasi, Ashanti Empire
- Burial: Kumasi, Ashanti Empire
Names
- Otumfuo Nana Osei Yaw Akoto
- House: Oyoko

Osei Yaw Akoto (c. 1800 – 21 February 1834), was the seventh King of the Ashanti Empire reigning from 1824 until his death on 21 February 1834.

== Biography ==
Immediately after his coronation, the Ashanti - who had won a crushing victory over a British army unit under his predecessor Osei Bonsu - were defeated by the British in July 1824. The Ashanti army had to withdraw to the capital Kumasi and the southern vassal states declared their independence. In 1826, the Ashantis suffered a second decisive defeat at Dodowa in another war with the British. Osei Yaw Akoto had launched his army into battle without sufficient preparation, and for the first time the British were using Congreve rockets as weapons. In 1831, the Ashantis, in a treaty with British Governor George Maclean, had to recognize the independence of their former vassal states in the south, and the Dagombas and Gonja in the north also broke with the domination of the Ashantis.

== See also ==
- Ashanti people
- Rulers of the Kingdom of Ashanti

== Bibliography ==
- Basil Davidson: A History of West Africa. 1000 – 1800. New revised edition, 2nd impression. Longman, London 1977, ISBN 0-582-60340-4 (The Growth of African Civilisation)
