= Kofi Karikari =

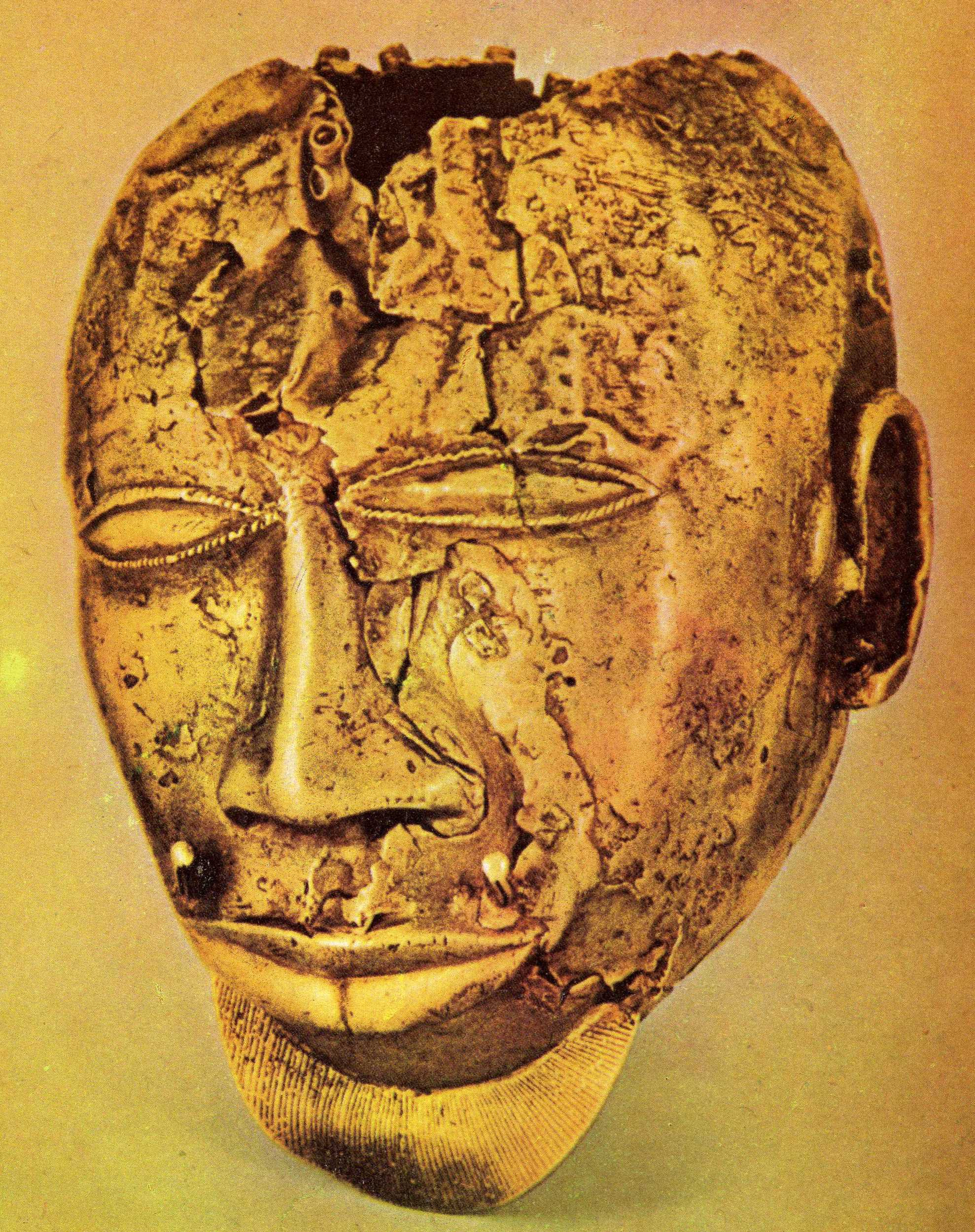
- Golden trophy head belonging to the treasury of Kofi Karikari

Asantehene of Asanteman
- Reign: 28 May 1867 – 26 October 1874
- Predecessor: Kwaku Dua Panin
- Successor: Mensa Bonsu
- Born: Unknown date, c. 1837; Kumasi, Ashanti Empire
- Died: Unknown date, c. 1884 (aged 47); Kumasi, Ashanti Empire
Names
- Otumfuo Nana Kofi Karikari
- Mother: Afua Kobi

Kofi Karikari (c. 1837–c. 1884) was the tenth King of the Ashanti Empire, and grandnephew of Kwaku Dua I, whose sudden death in April 1867 sparked internal strife about the succession. Kofi Karikari was chosen by an electoral majority, reigning from 28 May 1867 until his forced abdication on 26 October 1874. Karikari was the son of Afua Kobi.

A notable achievement of Karikari was the intentional neglect of the armed forces, a step taken to avoid the escalation of war. A golden trophy head, owned by Karikari can be found at the Wallace Collection in London, acquired by Sir Richard Wallace in May 1874 for £500.

Kofi had a great-great granddaughter, Beryl Karikari who had two sons, Korieh, and Akwasi Duodu.
