= Osei Kwame Panyin =

- Asantehene of the Ashanti Empire

Rulers of Asante
- Reign: 1777–1803
- Predecessor: Osei Kwadwo
- Successor: Opoku Fofie
- Born: Between 1762 and 1765
- Mother: Akyaama

Osei Kwame Panyin was the ruler of the Ashanti Empire from 1777 to 1801, holding the title of Asantehene. His reign was marred by uprisings, which would eventually lead to his suicide in 1803 to prevent an Ashanti civil war.

== Early life ==
Osei Kwame Panyin was born at some point between 1762 and 1765, to a woman named Akyaama, and Safo Kantanka, the King of Mampong. During that time, the region was a founding part of the Ashanti Empire, and was known as the Islamic gateway to the empire due to its location in the north.

== Rulership ==
=== Rise to power ===
Prior to his death, the Ashanti King Osei Kwadwo had declared Panyin to be his successor. However, upon Okoawia's death in 1777, when Panyin was around 17 years old, Okoawia's family members and councillors decided to ignore the former ruler's wishes resulting in an uprising by Atakora Kwame. He led an army to the Ashanti capital, Kumasi, and the northern provinces rose up in support of Panyin. Shortly after Panyin was made Asantehene (King), Kwame was overthrown from his position as councillor, leaving Panyin to deal with the political involvement of the former Queen Mother Konadu Yaadom.

=== Consolidation and uprising ===
Panyin consolidated his position over the course of the 1780s by removing former councillors from their positions and replacing them with allies. Where they could not be replaced, Panyin had those officials executed. Following the death of Yaadom's son Opoku Kwame, she accused the King of poisoning him. After Panyin refused to attend the Odwira festival, Yaadom took this as a reason to rise up against him, eventually placing Panyin under house arrest. She then proceeded to execute Panyin's former high-ranking allies.

He fled his captors, and briefly found romance in Ama Sewaa, although he would be accused of undertaking an incestuous relationship with her. When Yaadom gathered the majority of the Ashanti clans against Panyin in 1803, he committed suicide rather than trigger a civil war.

== See also ==
- Opoku Fofie
