= Afua Kobi =

Asantehemaa of the Ashanti Empire

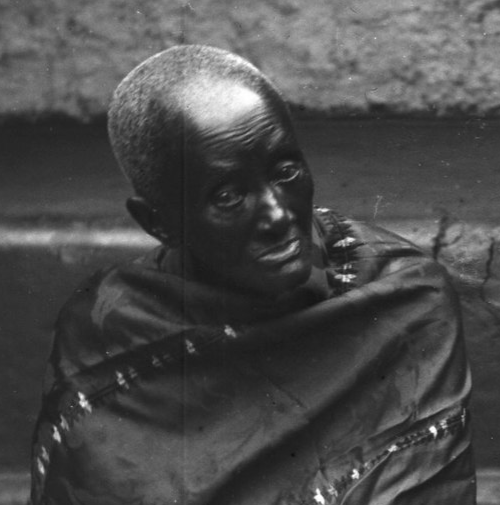
Afua Kobi (c.1815-1900), queen mother of the Ashanti Empire. Photo taken between 1874 and 1884

Afua Kobi (fl. 1834–1884) was an Asantehemaa of the Ashanti Empire.

Afua Kobi, an Asante ruler in the Asante Kingdom in present day Ghana, was an "asantehemaa", that refers to a "queen mother". She informed the Asante royal council to avoid the war with British in the 19th century, but was active in the ensuing war. Afua Kobi was born into Asante aristocracy and was the daughter of asantehene, the king Owusu Afriye and asantehemaa Afua Sapon, and became the ninth asantehemaa in the Asante dynasty.

== Personal life ==
After being the ninth Asantehemaa in the Asante dynasty, she married one of the ruling asantehenes's council. Between 1835 and 1850, they had five children which includes two out of those five children became asantehenes and one later became asantehemaa. After the death of her husband, Kofi Nti, Afua married Boakye Tenten, who was also a council member, however, they had no further children. Therefore, her descendants held their key position leading in to the twentieth century when her great-great grandson was elected to the Asante throne known as "The Golden Stool.

== History ==
Despite the fact that Afua was ninth asantehemaa in the Asante Dynasty, her sons were not considered to be serious candidates for the Asante throne. However, as the conflict with the British escalated, the war began, one of her children, Kofi Karikari were enlisted to become asantehene. He was persuaded to make an oath that he would not seek throne, meaning he would give up his chances in becoming a candidate to the Asante throne. In 1867, Kofi was elected to the Golden Stool after the executions and the other candidates being exiled. Even though Kofi was supported by those who recommended the war with the British, His position regarding on handling the British colonialism remained unclear. His Mother, in her position as the asantehemaa, she took action, and in 1872, this was her response to the British governor "I am only a woman, but would fight the governor with my left hand" (Aidoo,1981, p. 71).

She was against a war with the British Empire, and in 1873 she spoke before her son and the council of military chiefs warning them that such a conflict would destroy their empire. Nevertheless, the chiefs chose to fight; they lost, and Kofi Karikari was replaced by his younger brother Mensa Bonsu. She remained as senior counselor in 1881, although neither son achieved anything of note during his reign. Afua Kobi's daughter was Yaa Akyaa, who was eventually successful in seeing her children installed on the throne, and who in 1884 kicked her brother Mensa Bonsu from the throne; he and his mother were then exiled by Yaa Akyaa's agency.
