= Opoku Ware II =

- Asantehene of Asanteman; Kumasehene of Kumasi
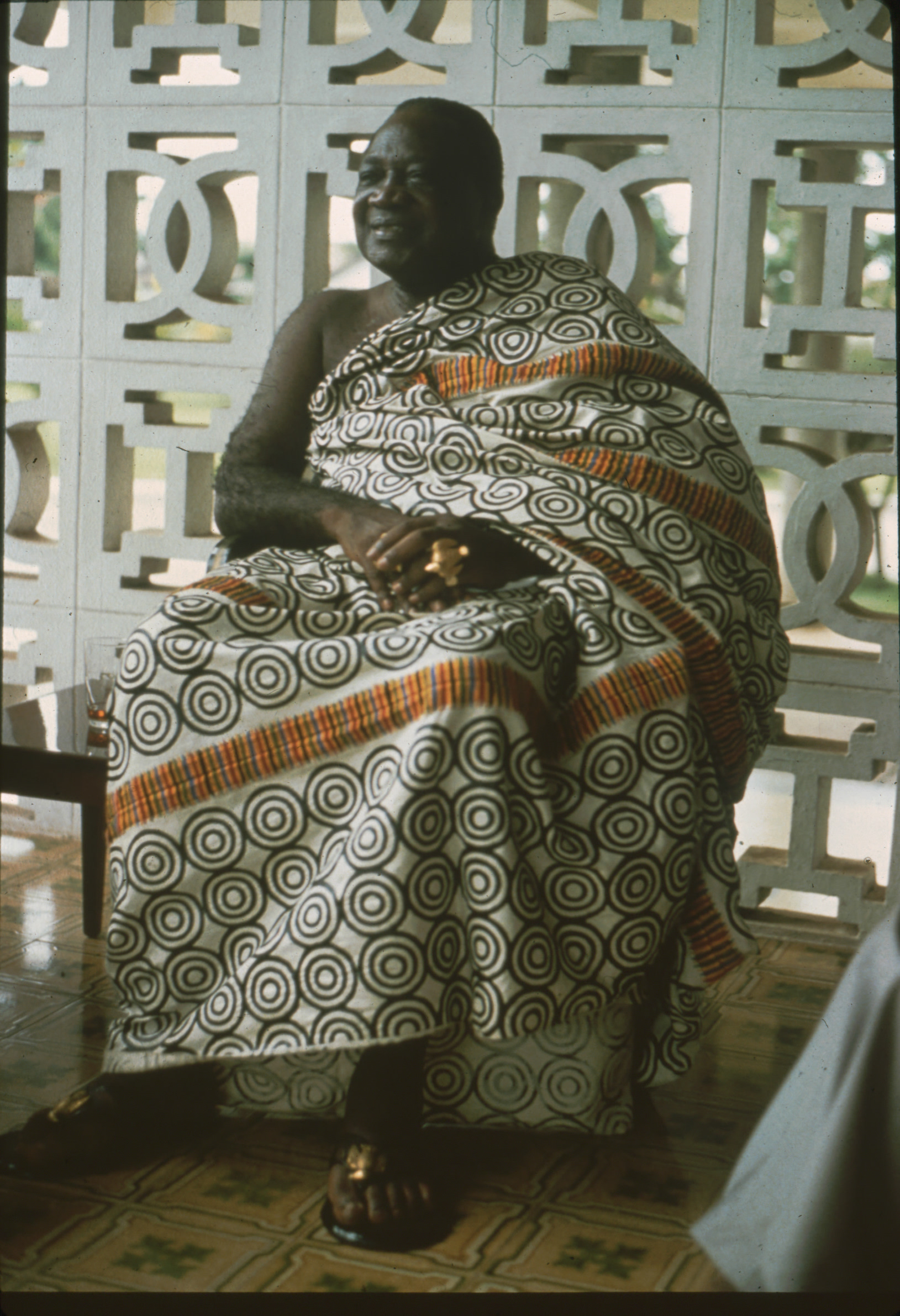
- Opoku Ware II in 1980

King of the Asante
- Reign: 27 July 1970 – 25 February 1999
- Coronation: 27 July 1970
- Predecessor: Prempeh II
- Successor: Otumfuo Nana Osei Tutu II
- Born: Jacob Matthew Poku; 30 November 1919; Kumasi, Ashanti Protectorate
- Died: 26 February 1999 (aged 79); Kumasi, Ashanti
- Spouse: Princess Victoria Opoku Ware
- Issue: Nana Osei, Gifty (1950–2018) and Leslie Poku
Names
- Otumfuo Opoku Ware II
- House: Oyoko
- Religion: Anglican

Commissioner for Communications
- In office February 1968 – April 1969
- President: Joseph Arthur Ankrah (1966–1969); Akwasi Amankwa Afrifa (1969)
- Preceded by: Alfred Jonas Dowuona-Hammond
- Succeeded by: Haruna Esseku (Minister for Transport and Communications)

Personal details
- Education: Adisadel College
- Alma mater: Middle Temple

Otumfuo Opoku Ware II (born Jacob Matthew Poku; 30 November 1919 – 26 February 1999) was the 15th Asantehene. He succeeded his uncle Osei Tutu Agyeman Prempeh II on 27 July 1970. He ruled for 29 years until his death in February 1999. He was succeeded by Otumfuo Nana Osei Tutu II.

== Early life and education ==
The future monarch was born under the name Jacob Matthew Poku in Kumasi the capital of Ashanti, then the Ashanti Protectorate, in 1919 into the Ashanti royal family. At the time, Prempeh I was Asantehene, as the Ashanti Emperor-King is called, before being succeeded by his nephew Prempeh II in 1931. Prempeh II in turn was Opoku Ware II's uncle, making the boy one of several candidates to succeed him, as to be decided by the Queen-mother, or Nana Asantehemaa. After attending Anglican school, Poku went to Adisadel College in Cape Coast. After working in the public sector for a while, in the 1950s, he moved to the United Kingdom to study law at the Middle Temple and was admitted to the bar in 1962.

== Career ==
Then, he worked as a building inspector and later for the Public Works department from 1937 to 1943. After that, he was trained as a surveyor and worked on the Kumasi Traditional Council Hall and Kwame Nkrumah University of Science and Technology.

Returning to the Gold Coast now Ghana after being called to the bar in 1962, he worked in the capital Accra first and then set up a firm in Kumasi. Through his success as a lawyer, Poku was able attain a great respect in Ashanti politics. Following the coup that overthrew Ghana's first president, Kwame Nkrumah in 1966, the National Liberation Council military government appointed Poku to their executive board as Commissioner for Communications (equivalent to Minister for Communications) in 1968.

== Reign ==
In 1970, he was named ambassador to Italy, but shortly thereafter his uncle, the King of the Ashanti, Prempeh II, died. Due to his legal and political successes, he was chosen to succeed his uncle and enthroned as the Asantehene. As King, Opoku Ware II maintained a good relationship with Ghana's President Ignatius Acheampong, and later Jerry Rawlings.

He focused on trying to implement the traditional justice of the Ashanti ethnic group, rather than becoming involved in national politics. Much like his predecessors, he rarely appeared in public and usually had a spokesman represent him. When he did appear, he was as tradition demands covered in gold and wore an intricately woven kente cloth.

In 1985 the stool Nkosuostool (Development stool) was created by Asantehene, Otumfuo Opoku Ware II, as a catalyst for development in Kumasi and beyond. Since then the trend of bestowing the title of Nkosuohene or Hemaa on notable people in Ghana has gained prominence.

In August 1995 he marked his silver jubilee celebration representing 25 years of his reign as Otumfuo Asantehene.

== Personal life and death ==
In 1945, he married another member of the royal family, Victoria. In 1996, Opoku Ware II's wife Victoria died. On 26 February 1999, the King himself died. He was given a state and Ashanti cultural funeral spanning four days of ceremonies blending both African and Christian traditions and buried on 25 March 1999 after a month of mourning at the Royal Mausoleum. He was succeeded on 26 April by Otumfuo Nana Osei Tutu II after a period of mourning. He was survived by his three children Oheneba/Prince Adusei Opoku Ware, Gifty (1950-2018) and Ambassador Princess Leslie Poku.
