= Aburaso =

Town in Ashanti Region, Ghana

- Town
- Location of Aburaso in Ashanti Region
- Country: Ghana
- Region: Ashanti Region
- District: Kwadaso Municipality

Population
  - Total: —
- Time zone: GMT
  - Summer (DST): GMT

Aburaso is a town near Kumasi and located in the Kwadaso Municipality in the Ashanti Region of Ghana. The current Assembly member of Aburaso is Emmanuel Nyanteng.

== Health ==
- Aburaso Methodist Hospital
