= Kwadaso Municipal District =

- Municipal District
- Districts of Ashanti Region

- Location of Kwadaso Municipal District within Ashanti
- Coordinates: 6°41′N 1°39′W
- Country: Ghana
- Region: Ashanti
- Capital: Kwadaso

Population (2021)
  - Total: 154,526
- Time zone: UTC+0 (GMT)

Kwadaso Municipal District is one of the forty-three districts in Ashanti Region, Ghana. Originally it was a sub-metropolitan district council within the Kumasi Metropolitan Assembly until 15 March 2018, when it was elevated to municipal district assembly status to become Kwadaso Municipal District. The municipality is located in the central part of Ashanti Region and has Kwadaso as its capital town.
