= Kwaku Dua II =

Kwaku Dua II. Kumaa (also Kwaku Dwa II. Kumaa) was from April 28, 1884 to June 11, 1884 the Asantehene (ruler) of the Ashanti Empire in what is today Ghana.

His reign did not last a quarter of a year when he died of smallpox. His sudden death triggered a period of several years of civil war, which only ended in 1888 when his successor Agyeman Prempeh took office.

== Literature ==
- Basil Davidson: A History of West Africa. 1000 – 1800. New revised edition, 2nd impression. Longman, London 1977, ISBN 0-582-60340-4 (The Growth of African Civilisation).
