= Kwaku Dua I =

Asantehene of Asanteman
- Reign: 25 August 1834 – 27 April 1867
- Predecessor: Osei Yaw Akoto
- Successor: Kofi Karikari
- Born: Fredua Agyeman; Unknown date, c. 1797; Kumasi, Asante Empire
- Died: 27 April 1867 (aged 70); Kumasi
- Issue: Prince Kwasi Boachi
- Dynasty: Oyoko
- Father: Boakye Yam Kumaa
- Mother: Amma Sewaa
- Conflicts: Battle of Katamanso; Anglo-Ashanti wars

Kwaku Dua Panin (born Fredua Agyeman; c. 1797 – 27 April 1867) was the eighth Asantehene of the Asante Empire from 25 August 1834 until his death.

== Early life ==
Prince Kwaku Dua took part in the fighting against the Gyaman, a state 200 kilometers (120 mi) north of Kumasi, from 1818 to 1819, and particularly distinguished himself in combat when he commanded a division in the battle of Katamanso in 1826.

In 1834, Kwaku Dua Panin succeeded Osei Yaw Akoto. His wives included Nana Takyiau and her sister, Nana Konadu Somprema.

== Reign ==
=== Domestic affairs ===
Under Kwaku Dua's reign, mercantilism was pursued. The public sector of the Asante economy grew during his era. The Asantehene was also notable for the unlawful extortion of payments from wealthy Asante in order to build the state reserves. Kwaku Dua created the Manwere fekuo, the 10th and final state administrative unit based in Kumasi. The office was formed around 1844 with Kwasi Brantuo selected by Kwaku Dua to head the office. Brantuo was Kwaku Dua's nanny during childhood and upon the election of the Asantehene, he became a treasurer. Kwaku Dua also created senior offices within the Manwere fekuo for his sons and princes.

=== Infrastructure projects ===
Kwaku Dua organized the construction of new streets to replace the old narrow streets of Kumasi for the convenience of his carriage. In 1841, he ordered for the construction of proper bridges across the streams of the metropolitan area. Reconstruction of the 7th Great Road occurred from 1836—1838. In 1839, it was documented by Freeman that permanent camps of road labourers were supplied by the King in Assin to maintain the 6th Great Road.

The Ashantehene built a new village during his reign which he called "Elmina." (not to be confused with Elmina) The village contained a large square building or barracks called "Dutch Fort" which served as a military depot. Kwaku Dua also ordered Dutch artillery pieces although the Dutch provided immobile cannon rather than field carriages. This depot may have been the royal arsenal at Eburaso. In the mid 19th century, T. B. Freeman described this depot as the royal arsenal where "all the stores of ammunition of war are kept, consisting of gunpowder, lead bars, etc. No stranger is allowed to visit this place. It is occupied by a strong guard, and is said to cover as large a space of ground, as the palace."

=== Foreign relations ===
Witnessing the frequent human sacrifices in Asante, the Dutch were convinced that the Asante had vast manpower, some of which could be made available to the Royal Dutch Army. On 18 March 1837, Kwaku Dua Panin signed an agreement with King William I of the Netherlands to provide recruits, a thousand of whom would join the Dutch East Indies Army within a year in exchange for guns.

Jacob Huydecoper, a Gold Coast Euro-African from Elmina, opened a recruitment agency in Kumasi to this end. As recruitment was still supposed to be voluntary, slaves offered to the recruiting agent received an advance payment – ostensibly to purchase their freedom. As part of the deal, two Asante princes, Kwasi Boachi—Kwaku Dua Panin's son—and Kwame Poku, were to be educated in the Netherlands. Boachi eventually graduated from the Royal Academy of Delft and became the first black mining engineer in the Netherlands who would go on to have a distinguished career in the East Indies. In 1841, Kwaku Dua was presented with a horse-drawn four wheeled carriage by Thomas Birch Freeman on behalf of the Wesleyan Missionary Society.

From 1841 to 1844, Kwaku Dua Panin fought against the Gonja and Dagomba to the north. In 1863, the Asante invaded territory to their south which was then under British protection, which soured relations with the British.

== Death ==
Kwaku Dua Panin died suddenly on 24 April 1867; he was succeeded by Kofi Karikari. Historian McCaskie writes that at the time of his death that year, the Adaka Kesie (The chest containing Asante's disposable currency reserves) was full with a value of nearly 180,000 mperedwan approximately £1,440,000 in the 19th century.
