= Prempeh I =

- Asantehene of Asanteman; Kumasehene of Kumasi
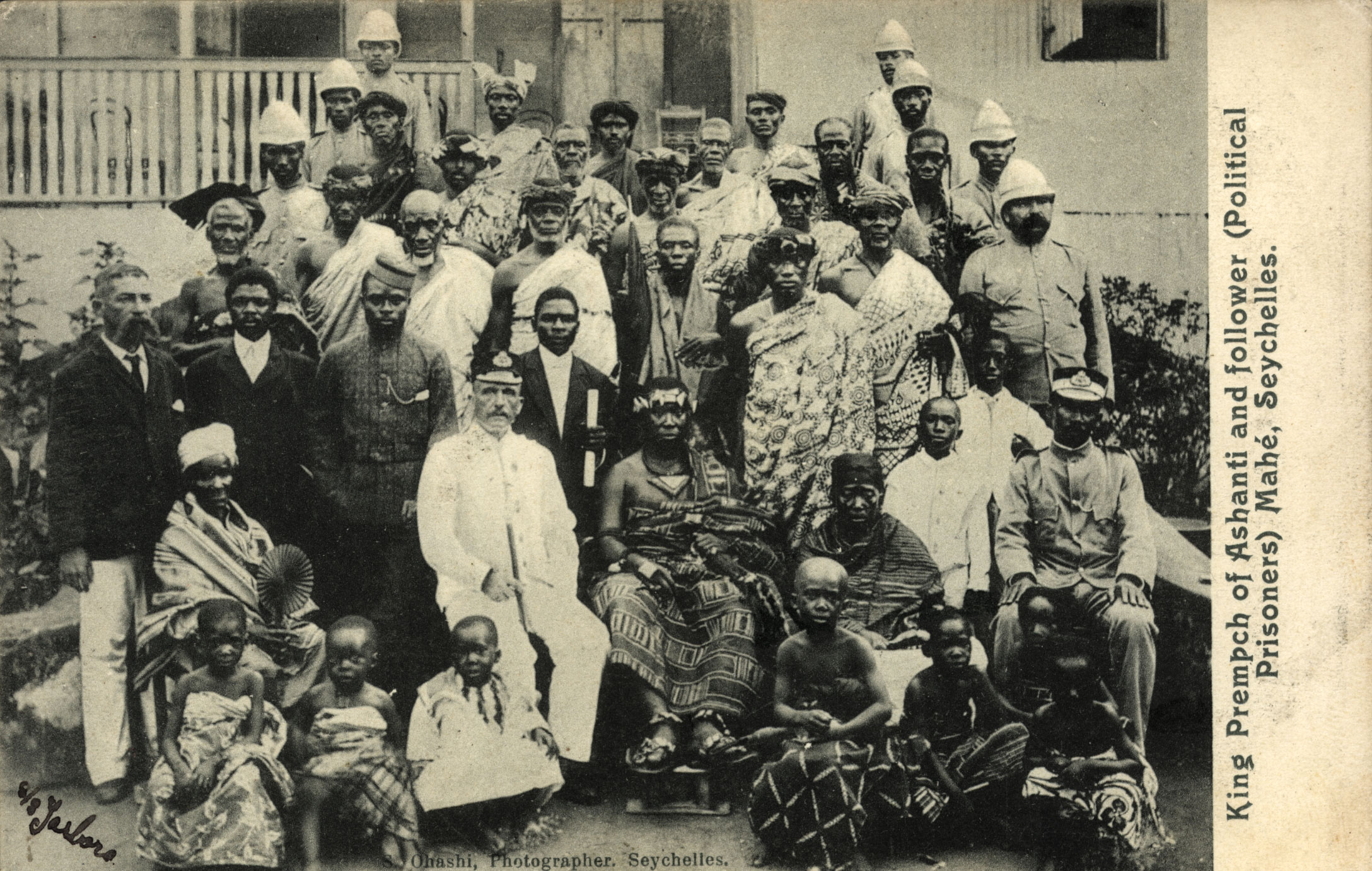
- Prempeh I (center; seated) in Mahé, c. 1900

King of the Asante Kingdom
- Reign: 26 March 1888 – 12 May 1931
- Coronation: 26 March 1888
- Predecessor: Kwaku Dua II; Owusu Sekyere II (regent)
- Successor: Prempeh II
- Born: 18 December 1870; Kumasi, Ashanti Empire
- Died: 12 May 1931 (aged 60); Kumasi, Ashanti Crown Colony, Gold Coast
- Burial: Bantama Royal Mausoleum, Kumasi
Names
- Otumfuo Nana Prempeh I
- House: Oyoko
- Father: Kwasi Gyambibi
- Mother: Yaa Akyaa

Prempeh I (Otumfuo Nana Prempeh I; 18 December 1870 – 12 May 1931) was the 13th King of the Ashanti Empire and the Oyoko Abohyen Dynasty. King Prempeh I ruled from March 26, 1888 until his death in 1931, and fought an Ashanti war against Britain in 1895-1896.

== Biography ==
=== Early life and family ===
King Prempeh I's original throne name was Prince Kwaku Dua III Asamu of the Ashanti Empire. Prempeh I's mother, Queen Yaa Akyaa, was Queen Mother of Ashanti from 1880 to 1917. Through strategic political marriages she built a military power to secure the Golden Stool for her son Prince Prempeh.

== Reign ==
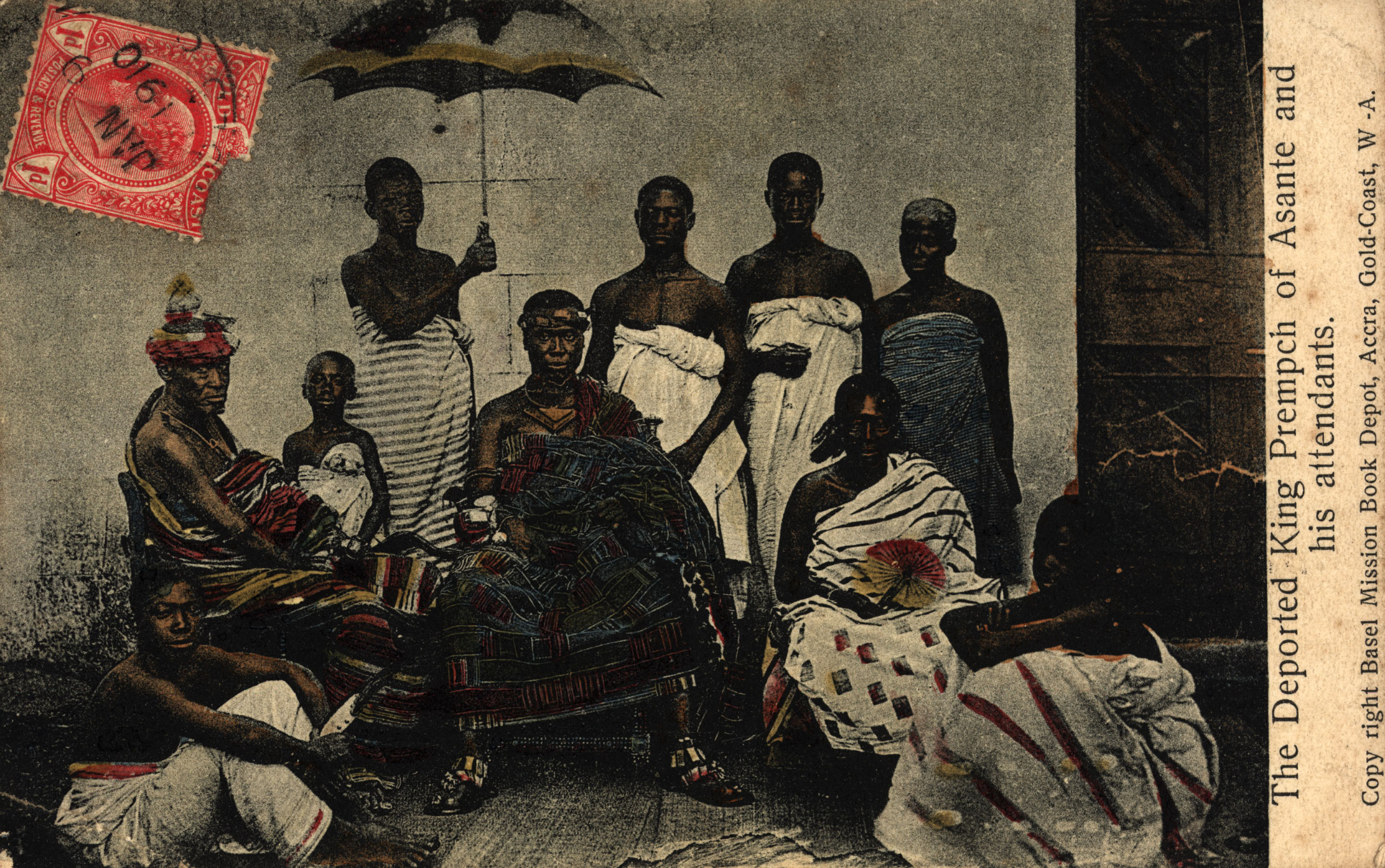
Prempeh I and his attendants

In 1888 Prince Prempeh ascended the throne, using the name Nana Kwaku Dua III. His kingship was beset by difficulties from the very onset of his reign. He began the defending of Ashanti from Britain and when Prempeh I was asked by Britain to accept a protectorate over Ashanti, he rejected it and stated in his reply that Britain had miscalculated. He began an active campaign of the Ashanti sovereignty. The British offered to take Ashanti under their protection, but he refused each request. Eventually a British expedition was launched on the basis of Prempeh's failure to pay an indemnity and his perpetuation of human sacrifices within his kingdom.

=== Ashanti-British relations ===
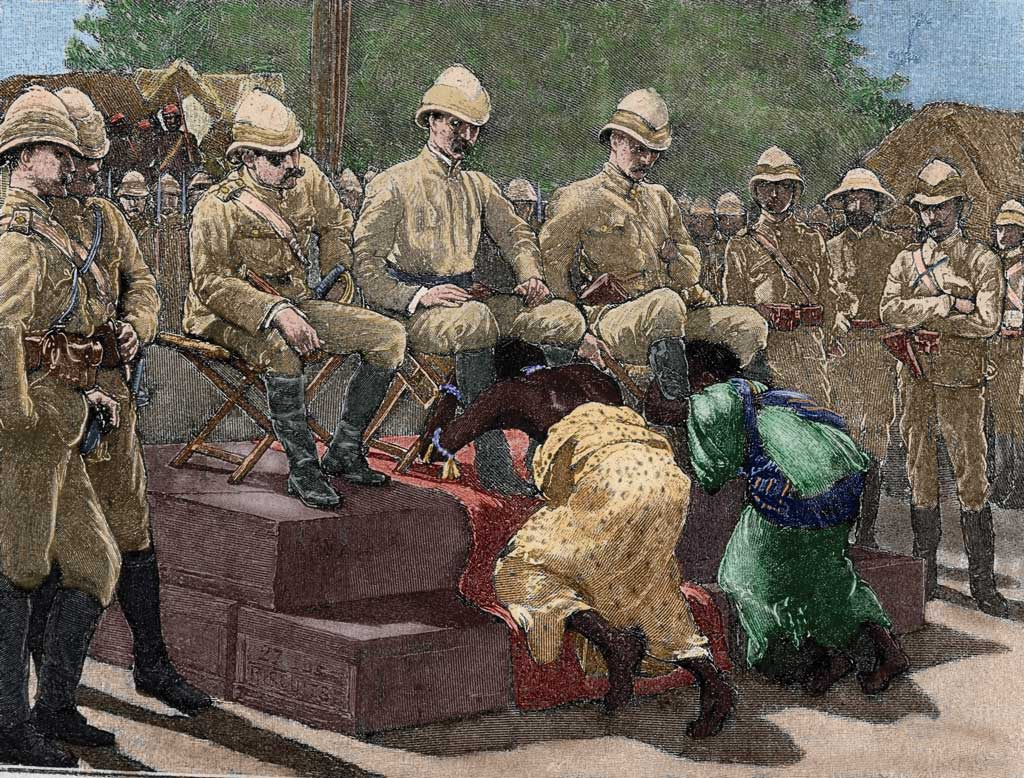
The Submission of King Prempeh, the Final Act of Humiliation

In December 1895, the British left Cape Coast with an expeditionary force. It arrived in Kumasi in January 1896 under the command of Robert Baden-Powell. The Asantehene directed the Ashanti not to resist the British advance, as he feared reprisals from Britain if the expedition turned violent. Shortly thereafter, Governor William Maxwell arrived in Kumasi as well.

Britain annexed the territories of the Ashanti and the Fante people, despite the British and Fante being allies during this time. Asantehene Agyeman Prempeh was deposed and arrested, and he and other Ashanti leaders were sent into exile in the Seychelles. The Ashanti Empire was dissolved. The British formally declared the state of the Ashanti and the coastal regions to be the Gold Coast Colony. A British Resident was permanently placed in the city of Kumasi, and soon afterwards a British fort was built there.

Asantehene Prempeh I was deported to the Seychelles from 1896 to 1924, a total of 28 years in exile. Upon his return he became Kumasehene, not Asantehene, since the British restricted the title.

Eleven years later, Baden-Powell published Scouting for Boys. Eventually Prempeh was released, and subsequently he became Chief Scout of the Gold Coast.

The Telegraph Battalion of the Royal Engineers (predecessor of the Royal Corps of Signals) played a prominent part in the Ashanti Campaign; men of the Telegraph Battalion hacked a path for an overhead line from the Coast to Prahsu, covering 72 miles through the jungle. These troops then staggered out of the jungle, confronted King Prempeh and accepted the surrender of his army. King Prempeh's throne is now displayed in the Royal Signals Museum at Blandford.

In 1900, a request that the Ashanti people turn over the "golden stool" – the very symbol of absolute Ashanti monarchical governance. The Empire of Ashanti gave no resistance and became semi-autonomous members of the British Empire. The Ashanti did later rebel against the British to fight the War of the Golden Stool (also known as the Yaa Asantewaa War) in 1900-1901. This resulted in the annexation of Ashanti to the British Empire, but preserved the sanctity of the Golden Stool. The British exiled Asantewaa and other Asante leaders to the Seychelles to join Asante King Prempeh I. In January 1902, Britain finally designated Asanteman as a protectorate. Asanteman was restored to independence on 31 January 1935.

Prempeh I spent time in his villa on Mahé from repatriation, the largest island of the Seychelles in the Indian Ocean. The villa was formerly a huge plantation, covered with coconut trees, mango, breadfruit and orange trees as well as a two-story villa. Prempeh I villa, and 16 new wooden houses with sandy floors and roofed with corrugated iron sheets, were built in the Seychelles and allocated to the various Asante nobles. Prempeh made an effort to educate himself in English, and ensured that the children received education.

The King, Asantehene Prempeh I once stated, "My Kingdom of Ashanti will never commit itself to any such policy of protection; Ashanti people and the Kingdom of Ashanti must remain an independent sovereign state as of old, and at the same time be friends with all white men".

== Death ==
Upon Prempeh's death on 12 May 1931, he was succeeded by his heir apparent Prempeh II as Asantehene. He was buried in Kumasi.

== See also ==
- Ashanti people
- Rulers of the Kingdom of Ashanti
- Molly Germaine Prempeh

== Sources ==
- King Prempeh's throne
- Asantehene (ruler of Asante).
- Manhyia archives
- Kingdom of Ashanti Kings And Queens Of Asante
