= List of rulers of Asante =

King of the Asante
- Asantehene ma Asanteman

Incumbent
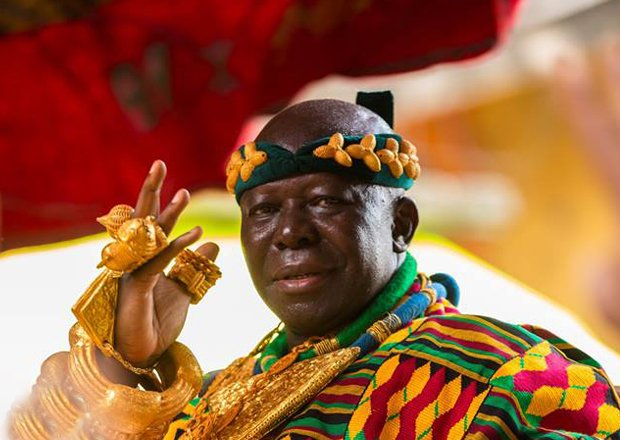
- Ɔsɛe Tutu II since 26 April 1999

Details
- Style: His – Your Majesty
- First monarch: Ɔsɛe Tutu Ɔpemsoɔ
- Formed: c. 1670; 355–356 years ago
- Residence: Manhyia Royal Palace
- Website: The Asante Monarchy

The Asantehene is the title for the monarch of the historical Asante Empire as well as the ceremonial ruler of the Asante people today. The Asante royal house traces its line to the Oyoko (an Abusua, or "clan") Abohyɛn Dynasty of Nana Twum and the Ɔyoko Dynasty of Ɔsɛe Tutu Ɔpemsoɔ, who formed the Empire of Asante in 1701 and was crowned Asantehene (King of all Asante). Osei Tutu held the throne until his death in battle in 1717, and was the sixth king in Ashanti royal history.

The Asantehene is the ruler of the Asante people. The Asantehene is traditionally enthroned on a golden stool known as the Sika 'dwa, and the office is sometimes referred to by this name. The asantehene is also the titular ruler of Kumase, which served as the capital of the Ashanti Empire and today, the Asante Region. The Asante Empire comprised parts of present-day southern Ghana and portions of present-day eastern Côte d'Ivoire between the 17th and 20th centuries.

The current asantehene is Otumfuo Nana Osei Tutu II, born Nana Kwaku Dua, who ascended as the 16th Asante king in April 1999. Osei Tutu II was one of seven descendants who were eligible to the heir presumptive.

== Elections and regents ==
During the period between the death of an Asantehene and the election of a successor, the Mamponghene, the Asantehene's deputy, acts as a regent. This policy was only changed during a time of civil war in the late 19th century, when the Kwasafomanhyiamu or governing council itself ruled as regent. The succession is decided by a series of councils of Asante nobles and other royal family members.

== The colonial era and Asante independence ==
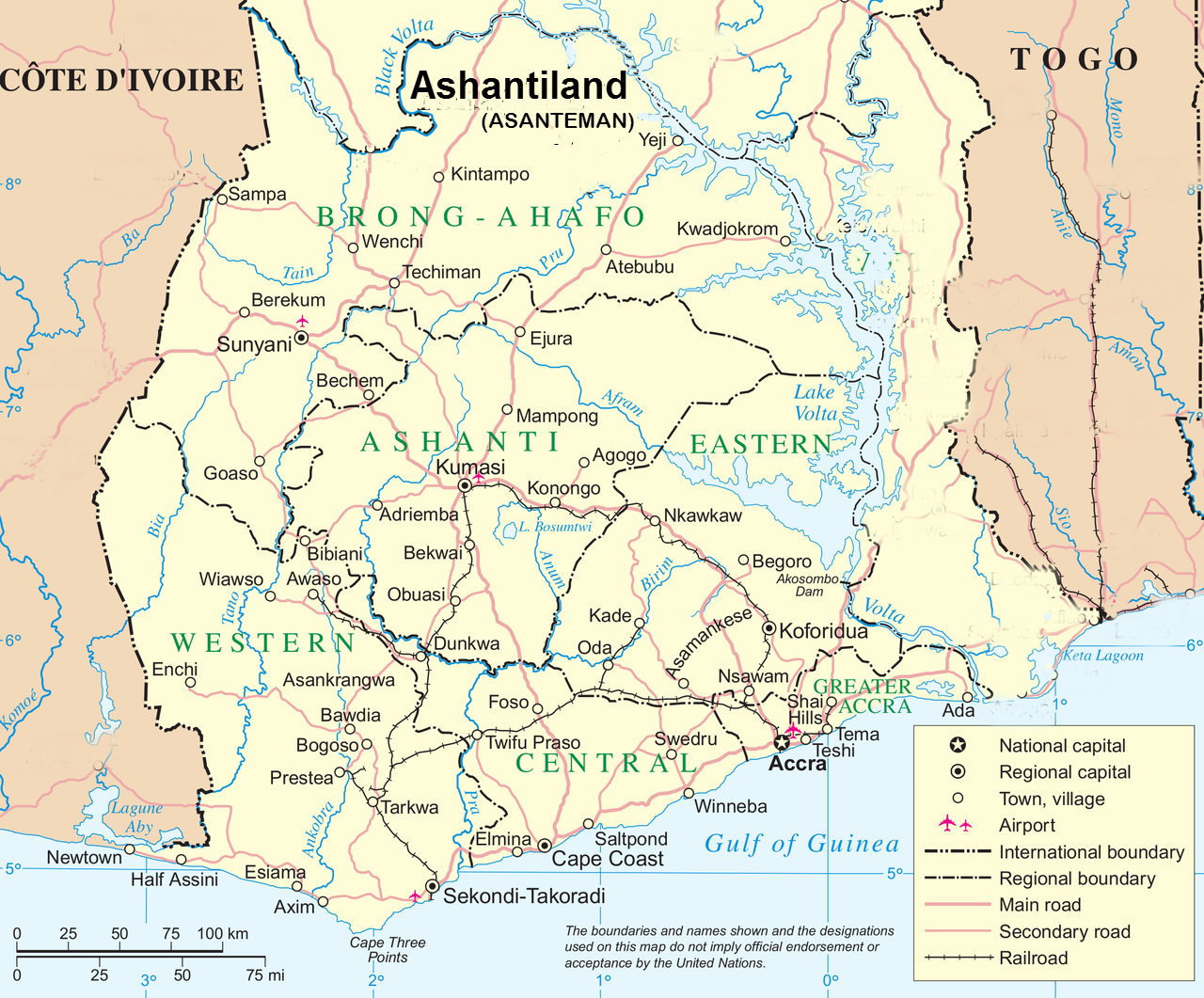
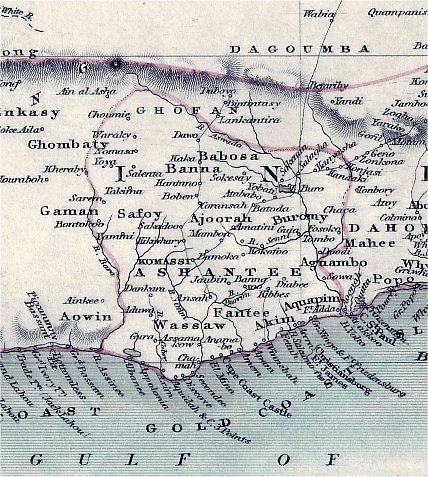
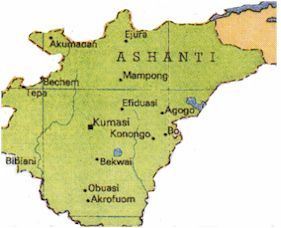
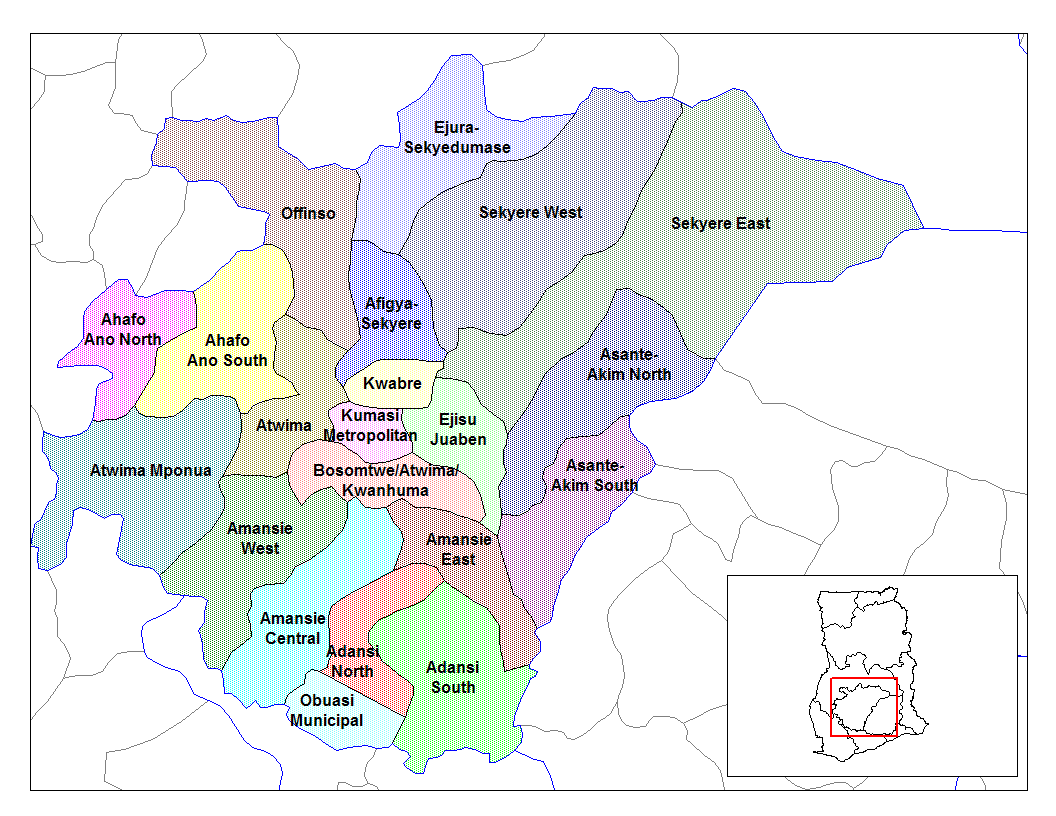
Map of Ashantiland (1st left) and the Kingdom of Ashanti (2nd left) and Ashanti Region (2nd right) with its administrative districts (1st right)

The Asante Confederacy was made a British protectorate in 1902, and the office of Asantehene was discontinued. In 1926, the British permitted the repatriation of Prempeh I – whom they had exiled to the Seychelles in 1896 – and allowed him to adopt the title Kumasehene, but not Asantehene. However, in 1935, the British finally granted the Ashanti moderated self-rule as the Kingdom of Ashanti, and the title of Asantehene was revived.

== List of rulers ==
All rulers in the lists below were members of the Oyoko Abohyen Dynasty.

=== Kwaamanhene of the Kwaaman State ===
Name	Reign
Nana Twum	c. 1570–1590
Nana Antwi	1590–1600
Nana Kobia Amamfi	1600–1630
Nana Oti Akenten	1630–1640

=== Kumasehene of the Kumaseman State ===
Name	Reign	Notes
Nana Obiri Yeboah	about 1640–c. 1680	
Otumfuo Nana Osei Tutu Opemsoo	about c. 1680/c. 1695–1701 (definitely Kumasehene by 1695)	Founder of Asanteman. Reign continues as Asantehene.

=== Asantehene of the Kingdom of Ashanti (Ashanti Empire) ===
All regents were members of the Oyoko Dynasty who were and still are the holders of the title Mamponghene.

Upon the death of the Asantehene, it is the task of the Mamponghene to act as the regent, or Awisiahene.

Name	Reign	Notes	Image
Otumfuo Nana Osei Tutu I	1701–c. 1717		
Regent c. 1717 to 1720 Amaniampon, the mamponghene
Otumfuo Nana Opoku Ware Katakyie	1720–1750	Grandnephew and nominee of predecessor.	
Otumfuo Nana Kusi Oboadum	1750–1764	Uncle of predecessor. Forced to abdicate after a disastrous battle.	
Regent 1764 Safo Kantanka, the mamponghene
Otumfuo Nana Osei Kwadwo Okoawia	1764–1777		
Regent 1777 Atakora Kwame, the mamponghene
Osei Kwame Panyin	1777–1803		
Otumfuo Nana Opoku Fofie	December 1803 – March 1804		
Osei Tutu Kwame Assibey	1804 – 21 January 1824	Known as Otumfuo Nana Osei Tutu Kwame Asiba Bonsu from 1807.	
Otumfuo Nana Osei Yaw Akoto	1824 – 21 February 1834		
Otumfuo Nana Kwaku Dua I	25 August 1834 – 27 April 1867		
Otumfuo Nana Kofi Karikari	28 May 1867 – 26 October 1874	Forced to abdicate.	
Regent 1874 Kwabena Dwomo, the mamponghene
Otumfuo Nana Mensa Bonsu	1874 – 8 March 1883	Forced to abdicate.	King Mensa Bonsu of Asanteman
Otumfuo Nana Kwaku Dua II	28 April 1884 – 11 June 1884	Died after short illness.	
Asante Civil War 1883–1888
Interim Council 1884 to 1887. Chairman: Owusu Kofi (11 June 1884 to November 1884) and Akyampon Panyin November (1884 to 1887).
Regent 1887 to 26 March 1888 Owusu Sekyere II, the mamponghene
Otumfuo Nana Prempeh I	26 March 1888 – 19 November 1895	Original throne name was Kwaku Dua III Asamu. Destooled in November 1885, Surrendered to the British Gold Coast governor on 20 January 1896. Exiled to Sierra Leone and Seychelles 1900. Released 12 September 1924. Restored as Kumasihene 12 November 1926.	
Otumfuo Nana Osei Tutu Agyeman Prempeh II	22 June 1931 – 27 May 1970	Enstooled as Kumasihene from 22 June - 31 January 1935, after which he was installed as asantehene Under the British government until 27 May 1970.	King Asantehene Prempeh II of Asanteman
Otumfuo Nana Opoku Ware II	6 July 1970 – 26 February 1999	Ruled as Ashanti King or Asantehene	King Asantehene Opoku Ware II of Asanteman
Regent 26 February 1999 to 26 April 1999 Osei Bonsu II, the mamponghene
Otumfuo Nana Osei Tutu II	26 April 1999–present	The reigning Asantehene	King Asantehene Osei Tutu II of Asanteman

== See also ==
- Emblem of His Majesty the King of Ashanti
