= History of Kumasi =

The history of Kumasi dates to the late 17th century when it emerged as the capital of the Ashanti Empire. Although various oral sources differ on the origin of Kumasi, majority agree it emerged as the capital of Ashanti under Osei Kofi Tutu I in the late 17th century. In the early 18th century, Kumasi was invaded and sacked by the Aowin but the invasion was curbed by Asantehene Opoku Ware I. 19th century written accounts by European visitors described the neatness and sophistication of the city. The population of Kumasi under the Ashanti Empire varies per source. The city was ransacked by the British Empire in 1874 during the Anglo-Ashanti Wars. A Civil war occurred within the 1880s which led to further decline of Kumasi. Another British invasion of the city occurred within 1895—1896 as Kumasi was left in ruins.

Ashanti became a formal colony of the British Empire in 1901. The city was modernised within this period with the construction of railways, universities, industries and hospitals. Around World War II, there was an influx of migrants into the city. The colonial government introduced new residential systems, parks and green belts. Within the mid 20th century, Kumasi was referred to as the "Garden City of West Africa".

After Ghana gained independence as a sovereign state, Kumasi has served as the capital of the Ashanti Region. It is the 2nd largest city in Ghana after Accra.

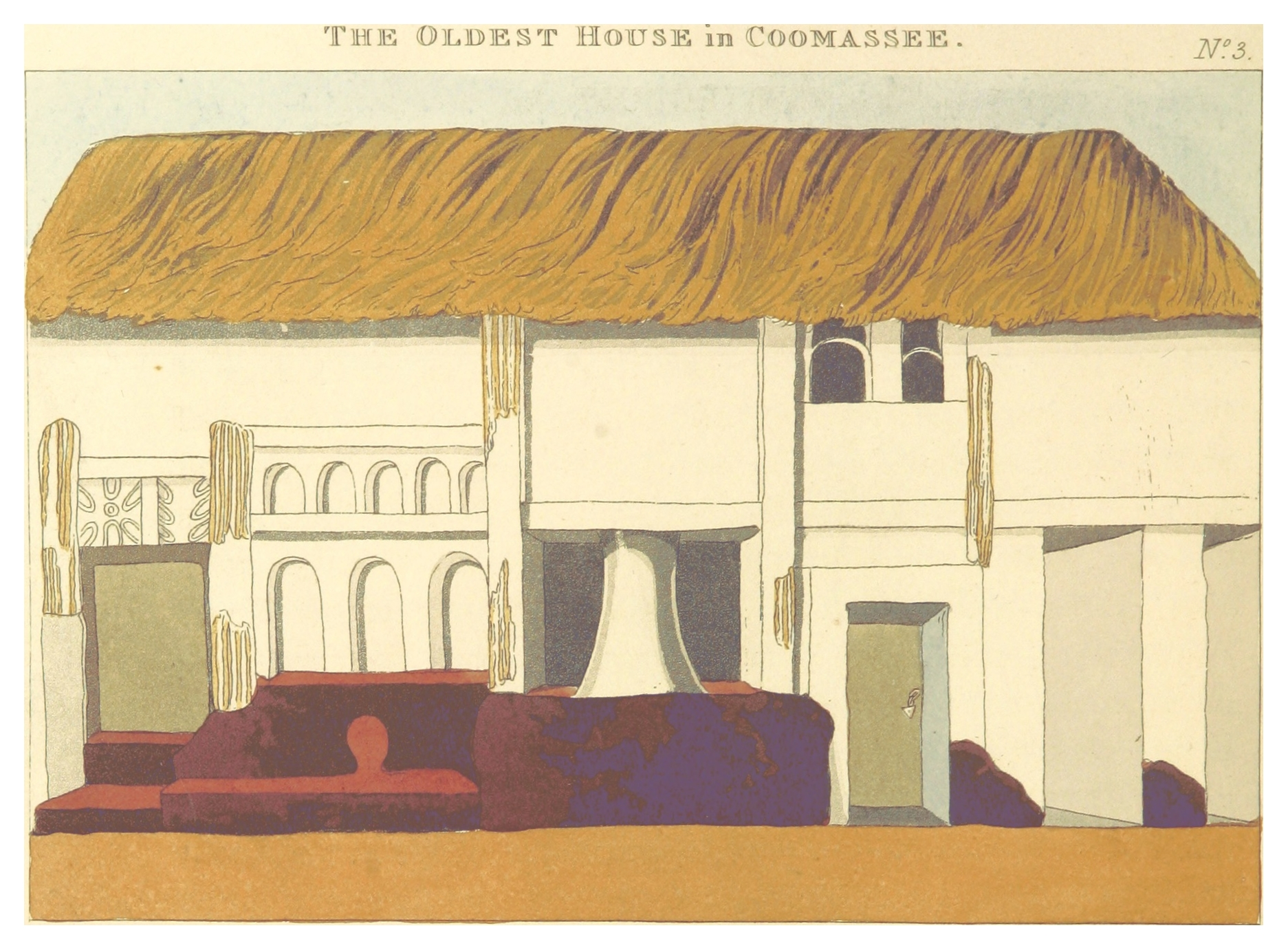
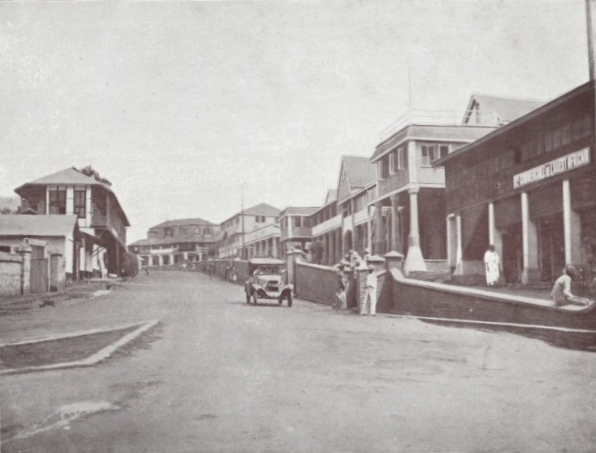
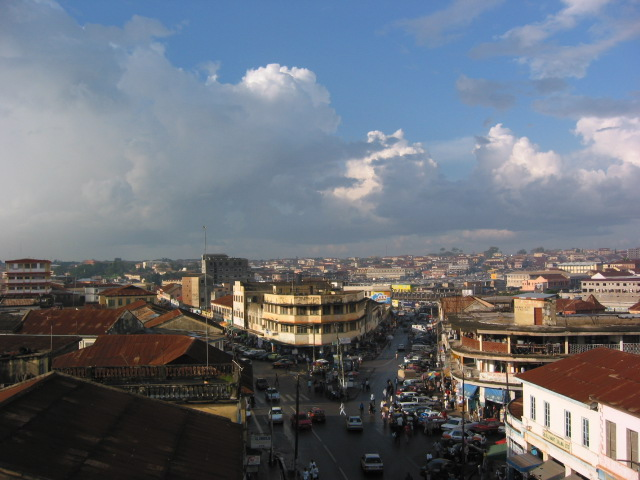
Clockwise: "The oldest house in Kumasi" by Thomas Edward Bowdich in 1817. The Kingsway, in 1925. Aerial view of Kumasi in 2003

== Ashanti Empire ==
=== Founding ===
Kumasi was founded around 1680 or in the 1680s by Asantehene Osei Kofi Tutu I as the capital of the Ashanti Empire. Various accounts exist on the formation of the city. One states that Osei Tutu negotiated for the land under a Kum Tree. Hence, from which the name Kumasi derived from. Other oral sources state it was Nana Oti Akenten who negotiated with the chief of Tafo for a plot of land under a Kum tree. Other traditions indicate that Oti built Kwaman and it was his son Nana Obiri Yeboa who created Kumasi instead. The majority of oral sources attribute the choice of site to Okomfo Anokye who was said to have planted two Kum seeds; one in Kwaman and another in Kumawu as he decreed that the one which grew would be designated as the capital of Osei Tutu's empire. Kumasi was built over the eastern slopes of a ridge, rising from the marshes of the Nsuben rivers.

=== Capital of the empire ===
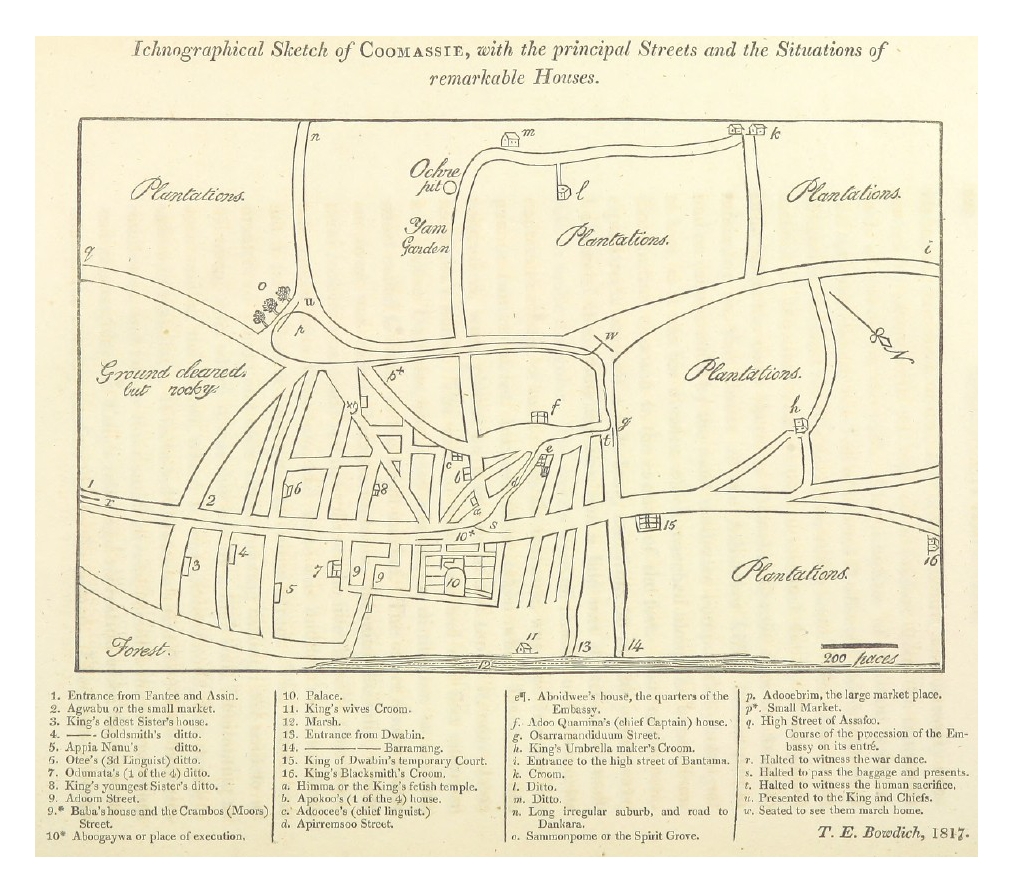
Bowdich's sketch of Kumasi c. 1817

In 1718–19, Aowin King Ebirimoro invaded Kumasi and sacked the capital. Asantehene Opoku Ware I and his army were away from the capital in battlefield when news reached of the destruction of Kumasi. The Dutch in Axim recorded that the Aowin plundered the city's gold and captured 20,000 of its populace. A number of Kumasi's royals were killed in the invasion. Opoku Ware was able to "beat back" this invasion.

In 1816, Huydecooper described Kumasi as having clean and straight streets with "houses excellently built, the latter being fairly tall but for the most part only one story." A year later, Thomas Edward Bowdich documented that the central city, with the exclusion of suburbs such as Bantama and Asafo - was oblong shaped and had a perimeter of approximately 4 miles. Four of its principal streets according to Bowdich, were half a mile long and about 50 to 100 yards wide. Bowdich also notes that Kumasi's streets were named and a "superior captain" was placed in charge of each street. At the time of Bowdich's visit in 1817, Kumasi had 27 streets and by the mid-1880s, another source identified 50 streets. The city had 77 wards and specific wards were inhabited by a particular class of artisans or workers. For instance, goldsmiths, umbrella makers, coffin makers, executioners and city patrollers resided in specific sections of the city. The palace complex was located in the eastern quarter of the central city. Bowdich refers to a piazza 200 yards long that "lines the interior of the wall secluding the palace." For sanitation, Bowdich recorded the presence of public toilets on the outskirt of town and the existence of toilets in each house as well. They were "not unfrequently upstairs" and boiling water was poured in daily to prevent "the least offence". The waste of houses was burned behind the street every morning. In peaceful times, the red and white clay of buildings were regularly polished and renewed. A uniformed police existed to maintain security.

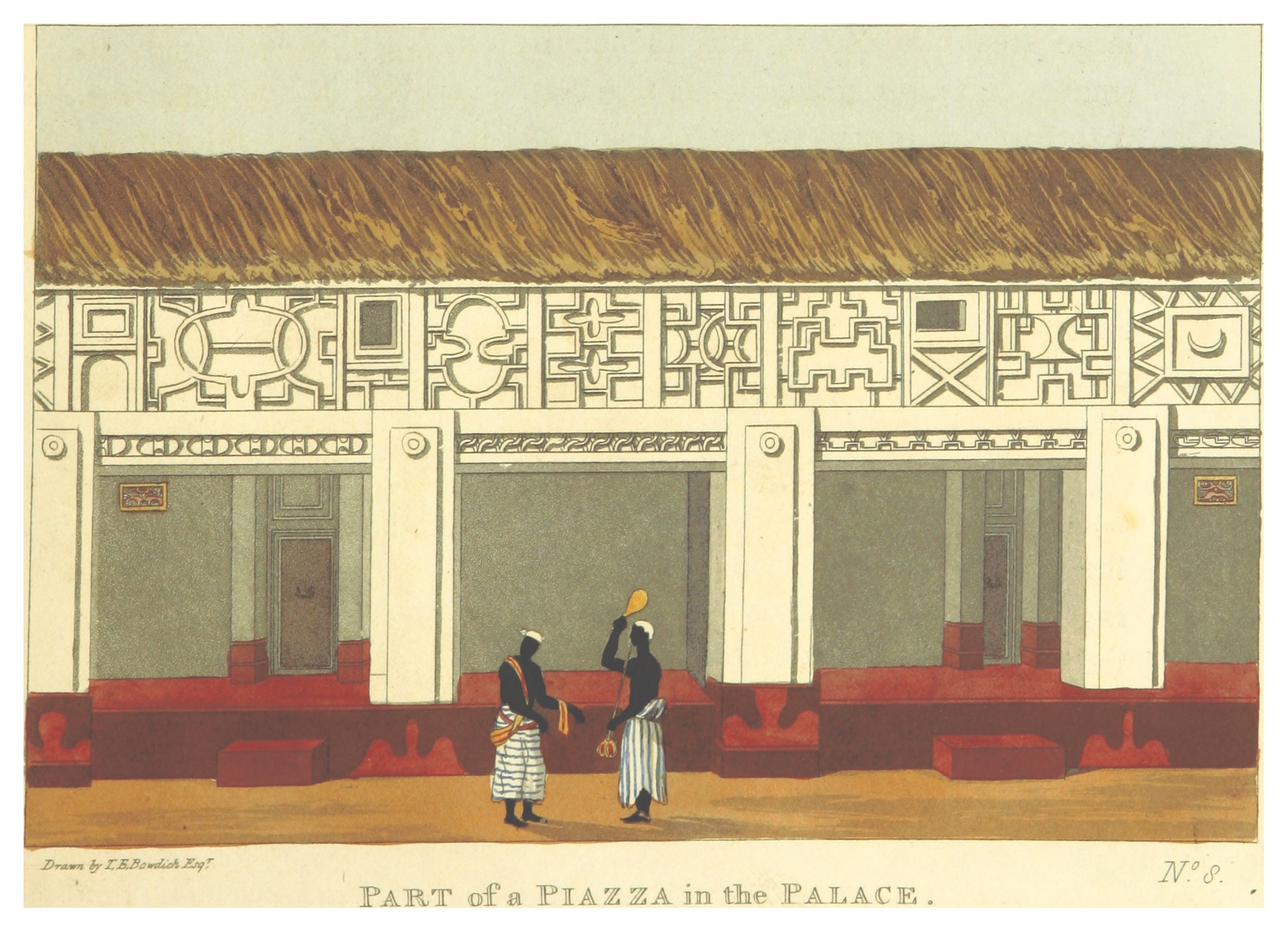
Part of a piazza in the Palace, by Bowdich (1819)

In 1820, William Hutton was disappointed with the ruinous condition of Kumasi. He concludes that this condition was because Asantehene Osei Bonsu and his major administrators had recently returned from the war against Gyaman. It was during the reign of Osei Bonsu that Muslims from Islamic states in modern Ghana formed a permanent settlement in Kumasi. The Muslim community in Kumasi was documented by Dupuis to have numbered around 1000 in 1820. The first Islamic schools of the empire were founded in Kumasi within the early 19th century.

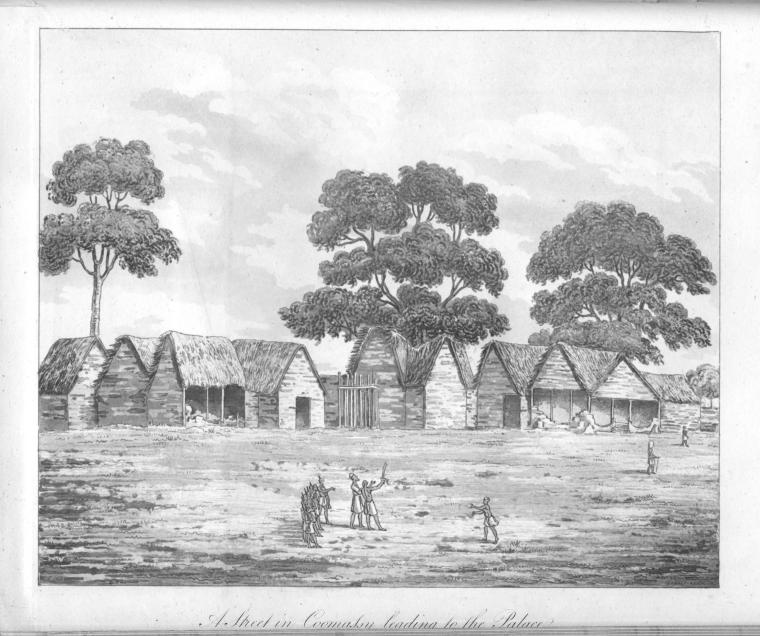
A street leading to the Palace engraved by James Wyld I in 1824

Mid-19th century accounts of the city recognized its neatness and architectural style. In 1839, Thomas Birch Freeman wrote:

The streets are large and more clean than I have seen in any native town since my arrival in Africa. The breadth of some of them is at least thirty yards and the average length from three hundred to six hundred yards. A row of splendid Banyan-trees, planted at a considerable distance from each other, occupies some of the large streets, affording a delightful shade from the burning rays of the sun...

— Freeman.

Governor William Winniett's description of Kumasi in 1848 closely matched that of Freeman. Both sources also described the presence of loggias called the Dampan. Before 1883, there were 150 Dampans in Kumasi. Dwaberem (The Great Market) and Apremoso (The place of Cannons) were the most significant assembly locations in the city. Apremoso was a place where the Asantehene along with officials and the city populace could convene for formal or informal matters. It was named after an elevation of cannons captured from the Battle of Feyiase. The Apremoso was the location of one of the most prominent public sumpene. The Great Market on the other hand, served additional functions beyond that of a marketplace. It was also used as a parade ground for military reviews, a royal courthouse or as a platform for the reception of prominent visitors. As a result, the Great Market lacked permanent market stalls.

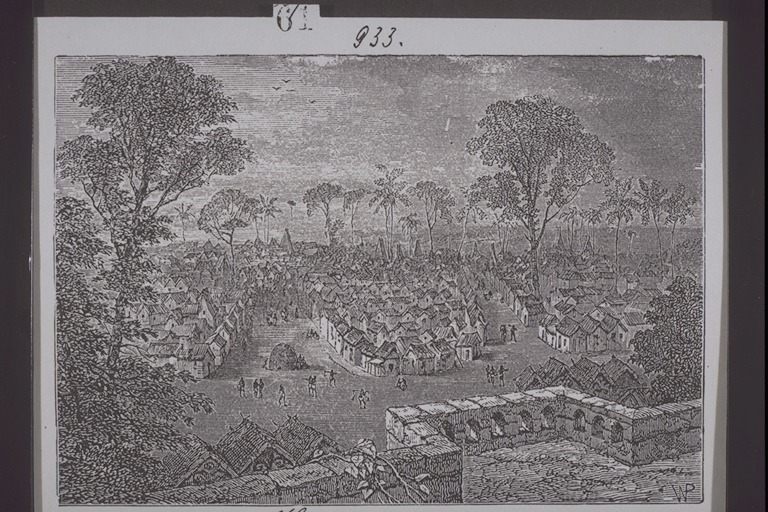
View of Kumasi from the Aban Palace before its destruction in 1874.

European sources in the late 19th century mentioned the city's neatness such as the account of F. Boyle in 1874 who stated Kumasi's smell "are never those of sewage" as well as Brackenbury, who wrote around 1873 that "the streets are generally very broad and clean, and ornamented with many beautiful banyan-trees affording grateful shade from the powerful rays of the sun." In contrast, William Butler described the city amid the British invasion, as 'a filthier, and far more blood-stained collection of mud and wattle hovels than any other village in the forest.' Parts of the city, including the then royal residence, were burnt by the British in the Third Anglo-Ashanti War of 1874. Native carriers were generally blamed for torching the city, and British engineers made strenuous efforts to quell the fires.

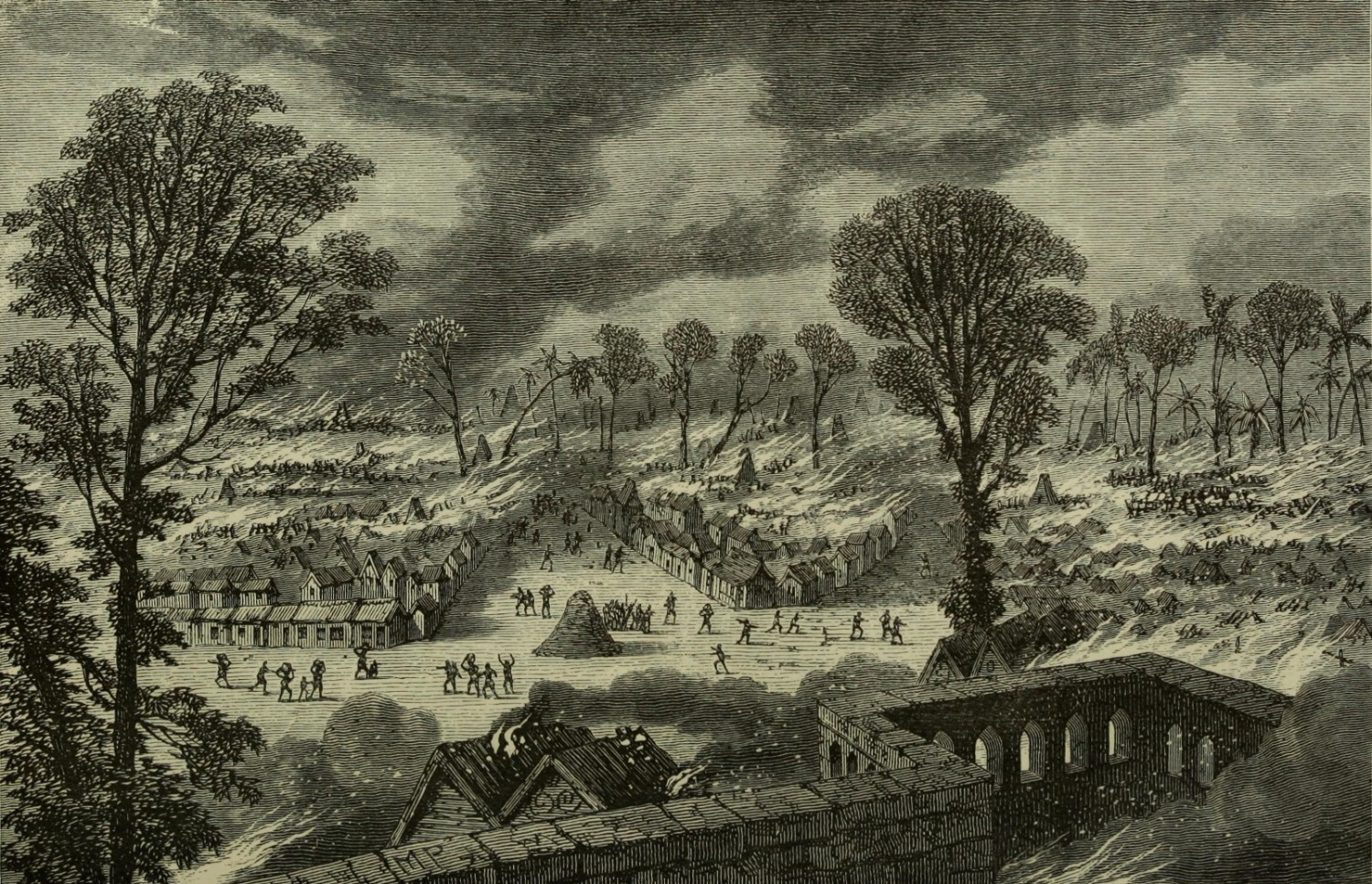
Burning of Kumasi in 1874 depicted by Henry Morton Stanley

In 1888, R. Austin Freeman was disappointed with the ruins of Kumasi following the British destruction in 1874 and the Ashanti civil war before 1888.

Kumasi was a great disappointment to me, and my disappointment increased as I walked round and examined the town. It was not merely that so little existed, but that so much had been destroyed. As it stands, or then stood, the town was nothing more than a large clearing in the forest, over which were scattered, somewhat irregularly, groups of houses. The paths were dirty and ill kept, and between the groups of houses large patches of waste ground intervened, and on these, amidst the tall, coarse grass that covered them, were to be seen the remains of houses that had once occupied them. These houses once stood in wide and regular streets, but since the destruction of the city in 1874 the natives do not seem to have had heart to rebuild them. Yet there remained some few vestiges to show what Kumasi had been in its palmy days... A few broad, well-kept streets still existed, lined by houses, [of] ... admirable construction, careful and artistic finish and excellent repair...

— R. Austin Freeman.

Freeman notes that besides the British invasion of 1874, a civil war lasting 5 years took place in Asante and concluded by 1888. This led to a further decline of Kumasi. Between 1895 and 1896, the British Empire invaded Kumasi again. The Secretary of State for the Colonies justified the expedition by announcing that it was to "appoint a resident in Kumasi who would see to it that the King carried out his engagements." Kumasi and its nearby villages were destroyed as the British rebuilt the city on the same location. A war broke out in 1900 following Governor Frederick Mitchell Hodgson's speech in Kumasi about his demand of the Golden Stool. Hogson was held under siege in Kumasi by the Ashanti until he broke out of the city on 23 June 1900. By 1 January 1901, British war operations came to an official end with the defeat of the Ashanti.

=== Population ===
Population of Kumasi during the time of the Ashanti Empire varied. In the early 19th century, Ashanti sources estimated a populace of 100,000 while European sources gave a figure around 12–15,000. Another source in 1820 provided an estimate of more than 200,000. According to historian Ivor Wilks, the city may have had a population of 40,000 in the 1860s.

== British Colonial era (1901–1957) ==
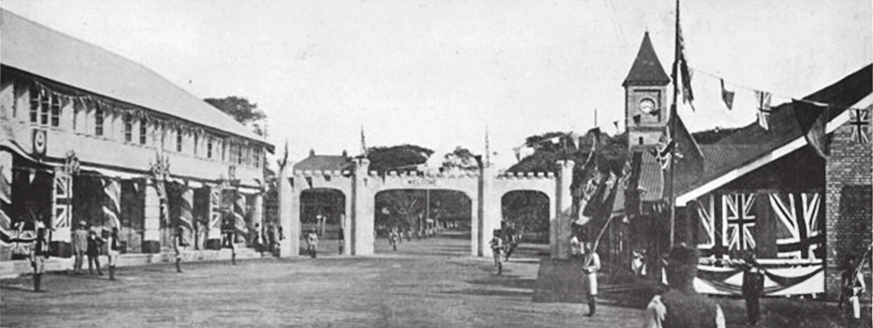
Kumasi in 1925

Kumasi was formally annexed in 1901. The city was in ruins since the 1880s and by 1901 its population had declined to 3000. Modernization of Kumasi began in 1896. The Kumasi Fort was constructed in the centre of town to function as the colonial administrative headquarters. In 1905, the wetlands close to central part of the town were drained for the construction of railways and its station to connect Accra and Cape Coast. In 1925, the colonial government established the Kumasi Public Health Board as the modern local government. The Kumasi Light and Power Supply was founded within this period. Pipe-borne water was developed in the 1920s. The Kumasi Combined General Hospital and the Kumasi Mental Hospital were also constructed. Under the colonial government, the Kumasi economy became cash-based with the establishment of industries to tap into rubber and cocoa. In 1907, 11 European firms were established in the city. In the 1920s, the Wesley College of Education was built while the Central Market was completed in 1925. The University of Science and Technology was established in 1952. Kumasi hosted the Conference of West African Nationalists in 1953.

The colonial government removed strict barriers that deterred emigration to Kumasi. There was an influx of immigrants as a result; these included people from the Northern Territories, Syrians, Lebanese and Indians. Houses made of swish, brick or cement with iron and shingle roof spread within this period. By 1905, 60 of such houses were built within the city. Kumasi struggled with migration especially during the Second World War. The government introduced Social Welfare services in response. A Probation service, Juvenile Court, Remand Home and Community Centre were established in the 1940s. Historian Busia comments on the growth of individualism that accompanied the modernization of Kumasi.

In 1910, Chief Commissioner of Asante, J. F. C. Fuller provided rules to regulate construction in Kumasi which stated that the permits for construction could be obtained through the Chief commissioner. These regulations were limited to European residential areas as African residential areas lacked proper supervision. In the 1940s, the District commissioner revived Akan courtyard architecture with British influence but this received poor reception from the locals for its unsanitary and uncomfortable conditions. In 1944, the District Commissioner promoted the construction of nuclear settlements in Kumasi Zongo which received mixed reception. European residences within this period were characterized by Bungalows. Schmidt argues that the British colonial government segregated Kumasi's residential districts on racial lines. Green belts were developed but these emerged as Nature Reserves when Ghana gained independence. Parks were also planned in the city. In the mid 20th century, Kumasi was referred to as the "Garden City of West Africa".

== Ghana (1957–present) ==
Historical population
Year	Pop.	±% p.a.
1970	346,336	—
1984	487,504	+2.47%
2000	1,000,000	+4.59%
2010	2,022,919	+7.30%
Ghana Statistical Service.

Kumasi is the capital of the Ashanti Region and it is administered by a municipal authority. Kumasi is the 2nd largest city in Ghana. In the 1950—60s, an Akan hybrid courtyard building style fostered within this period. It was a blend of traditional and European architecture. This style was more suitable for extended families. Since independence, colonial public spaces have declined. In 1988, Kumasi was denoted as Metropolitan under the PNDCL 208. The Local Government Act, 1993, Act 462, allowed for the election of representatives from the local assembly who participate in the planning process. This Act was replaced by the Local Government Act, 2016, Act 925. On 30 May 2020, Kumasi, along with Accra, was placed under lockdown as part of the government's responses to the COVID-19 pandemic in Ghana. The lockdown was lifted around 19/20 April 2020.
