= Cultural relativism =

Anthropological view

Cultural relativism is the view that the values (such as moral values) of a culture must be understood in their own cultural context and not judged according to the standards of a different culture. It asserts the equal validity of all points of view and the relative nature of truth, which is determined by an individual or their culture.

The concept was established by anthropologist Franz Boas, who first articulated the idea in 1887: "civilization is not something absolute, but ... is relative, and ... our ideas and conceptions are true only so far as our civilization goes". However, Boas did not use the phrase "cultural relativism". The concept was spread by Boas's students, such as Robert Lowie.

The first use of the term recorded in the Oxford English Dictionary was by philosopher and social theorist Alain Locke in 1924 to describe Lowie's "extreme cultural relativism", found in the latter's 1917 book Culture and Ethnology.

The term became common among anthropologists after Boas' death in 1942, to express their synthesis of a number of ideas he had developed. Boas believed that the sweep of cultures, to be found in connection with any subspecies, is so vast and pervasive that there cannot be a relationship between culture and race. Cultural relativism involves specific epistemological and methodological claims. Whether or not these claims necessitate a specific ethical stance is a matter of debate. Cultural relativism became popularized after World War II in reaction to historical events such as "Nazism, and to colonialism, ethnocentrism and racism more generally."

== In antiquity ==
Herodotus (Histories 3.38) observes on the relativity of mores (νόμοι):

If anyone, no matter who, were given the opportunity of choosing from amongst all the nations in the world the set of beliefs which he thought best, he would inevitably—after careful considerations of their relative merits—choose that of his own country. Everyone without exception believes his own native customs, and the religion he was brought up in, to be the best; and that being so, it is unlikely that anyone but a madman would mock at such things. There is abundant evidence that this is the universal feeling about the ancient customs of one's country.

— translated by Aubrey de Selincourt

Herodotus mentions an anecdote of Darius the Great who illustrated the principle by inquiring about the funeral customs of the Greeks and the Callatiae, peoples from the extreme western and eastern fringes of his empire, respectively. They practiced cremation and funerary cannibalism, respectively, and were each dismayed and abhorred at the proposition of the other tribes' practices.

The works of the Pyrrhonist philosopher Sextus Empiricus detail ancient Greek arguments for cultural relativism as part of the tenth of the Ten Modes of Aenesidemus.

== As a methodological and heuristic device ==
According to George E. Marcus and Michael M. J. Fischer:

20th century social and cultural anthropology has promised its still largely Western readership enlightenment on two fronts. The one has been the salvaging of distinct cultural forms of life from a process of apparent global Westernization. With both its romantic appeal and its scientific intentions, anthropology has stood for the refusal to accept this conventional perception of homogenization toward a dominant Western model.

Cultural relativism was, in part, a response to Western ethnocentrism. Ethnocentrism may take obvious forms, in which one consciously believes that one's people's arts are the most beautiful, values the most virtuous, and beliefs the most truthful. Franz Boas, originally trained in physics and geography, and heavily influenced by the thought of Kant, Herder, and von Humboldt, argued that one's culture may mediate and thus limit one's perceptions in less obvious ways. Boas understood "culture" to include not only certain tastes in food, art, and music, or beliefs about religion; he assumed a much broader notion of culture, defined as:

[T]he totality of the mental and physical reactions and activities that characterize the behavior of the individuals composing a social group collectively and individually in relation to their natural environment, to other groups, to members of the group itself, and of each individual to himself.

This view of culture confronts anthropologists with two problems: first, how to escape the unconscious bonds of one's own culture, which inevitably bias our perceptions of and reactions to the world, and second, how to make sense of an unfamiliar culture. The principle of cultural relativism thus forced anthropologists to develop innovative methods and heuristic strategies.

=== As a methodological tool ===
Between World War I and II, cultural relativism was the central tool for American anthropologists in this rejection of Western claims to universality and salvage of non-Western cultures. It functioned to transform Boas' epistemology into methodological lessons.

This is most obvious in the case of language. Although language is commonly thought of as a means of communication, Boas called attention especially to the idea that it is also a means of categorizing experiences, hypothesizing that the existence of different languages suggests that people categorize, and thus experience, language differently (this view was more fully developed in the hypothesis of Linguistic relativity).

Thus, although all people perceive visible radiation the same way, in terms of a continuum of color, people who speak different languages slice up this continuum into discrete colors in different ways. Some languages have no word that corresponds to the English word green. When people who speak such languages are shown a green chip, some identify it using their word for blue, others identify it using their word for yellow. Thus, Boas's student Melville Herskovits summed up the principle of cultural relativism thus: "Judgements are based on experience, and experience is interpreted by each individual in terms of his own enculturation."

Boas pointed out that scientists grow up and work in a particular culture, and are thus necessarily ethnocentric. He provided an example of this in his 1889 article "On Alternating Sounds". A number of linguists at Boas's time had observed that speakers of some Native-American languages pronounced the same word with different sounds indiscriminately. They thought that this meant that the languages were unorganized and lacked strict rules for pronunciation, and they took it as evidence that the languages were more primitive than their own. Boas, however, noted that the variant pronunciations were not an effect of lack of organization of sound patterns, but an effect of the fact that these languages organized sounds differently from English. The languages grouped sounds that were considered distinct in English into a single sound, but also having contrasts that did not exist in English. He then argued the case that Native Americans had been pronouncing the word in question the same way, consistently, and the variation was only perceived by someone whose own language distinguishes those two sounds. Boas's student, the linguist Edward Sapir, later noted also that English speakers pronounce sounds differently even when they think they are pronouncing the same sound. For example, few English speakers realize that the sounds written with the letter ⟨t⟩ in the words tick and stick are phonetically different, the first being generally aspirated and the other unaspirated; a speaker of a language where this contrast is meaningful would instantly perceive them as different sounds and tend not to see them as different realizations of a single phoneme.

Boas's students did not draw only on his engagement with German philosophy. They also engaged the work of contemporary philosophers and scientists, such as Karl Pearson, Ernst Mach, Henri Poincaré, William James, and John Dewey in an attempt to move, in the words of Boas's student Robert Lowie, from "a naively metaphysical to an epistemological stage" as a basis for revising the methods and theories of anthropology.

Boas and his students realized that, if they were to conduct scientific research in other cultures, they would need to employ methods that would help them escape the limits of their own ethnocentrism. One such method is that of ethnography: basically, they advocated living with people of another culture for an extended period of time, so that they could learn the local language and be enculturated, at least partially, into that culture.

In this context, cultural relativism is an attitude that is of fundamental methodological importance, because it calls attention to the importance of the local context in understanding the meaning of particular human beliefs and activities. Thus, in 1948 Virginia Heyer wrote: "Cultural relativity, to phrase it in starkest abstraction, states the relativity of the part to the whole. The part gains its cultural significance by its place in the whole, and cannot retain its integrity in a different situation."

=== As a heuristic tool ===
Another method was ethnology: to compare and contrast as wide a range of cultures as possible, in a systematic and even-handed manner. In the late nineteenth century, this study occurred primarily through the display of material artifacts in museums. Curators typically assumed that similar causes produce similar effects; therefore, in order to understand the causes of human action, they grouped similar artifacts together—regardless of provenance. Their aim was to classify artifacts, like biological organisms, according to families, genera, and species. Thus organized museum displays would illustrate the evolution of civilization from its crudest to its most refined forms.

In an article in the journal Science, Boas argued that this approach to cultural evolution ignored one of Charles Darwin's main contributions to evolutionary theory:

It is only since the development of the evolutional theory that it became clear that the object of study is the individual, not abstractions from the individual under observation. We have to study each ethnological specimen individually in its history and in its medium.... By regarding a single implement outside of its surroundings, outside of other inventions of the people to whom it belongs, and outside of other phenomena affecting that people and its productions, we cannot understand its meanings.... Our objection...is, that classification is not explanation.

Boas argued that although similar causes produce similar effects, different causes may also produce similar effects. Consequently, similar artifacts found in distinct and distant places may be the products of distinct causes. Against the popular method of drawing analogies in order to reach generalizations, Boas argued in favor of an inductive method. Based on his critique of contemporary museum displays, Boas concluded:

It is my opinion that the main object of ethnological collections should be the dissemination of the fact that civilization is not something absolute, but that it is relative, and that our ideas and conceptions are true only so far as our civilization goes.

Boas's student Alfred Kroeber described the rise of the relativist perspective thus:

Now while some of the interest in (so called solial culture science) anthropology in its earlier stages was in the exotic and the out-of-the-way, yet even this antiquarian motivation ultimately contributed to a broader result. Anthropologists became aware of the diversity of culture. They began to see the tremendous range of its variations. From that, they commenced to envisage it as a totality, as no historian of one period or of a single people was likely to do, nor any analyst of his own type of civilization alone. They became aware of culture as a "universe", or vast field in which we of today and our own civilization occupy only one place of many. The result was a widening of a fundamental point of view, a departure from unconscious ethnocentricity toward relativity. This shift from naive self-centeredness in one's own time and spot to a broader view based on objective comparison is somewhat like the change from the original geocentric assumption of astronomy to the Copernican interpretation of the solar system and the subsequent still greater widening to a universe of galaxies.

This conception of culture, and principle of cultural relativism, were for Kroeber and his colleagues the fundamental contribution of anthropology, and what distinguished anthropology from similar disciplines such as sociology and psychology.

Ruth Benedict, another of Boas's students, also argued that an appreciation of the importance of culture and the problem of ethnocentrism demands that the scientist adopt cultural relativism as a method. Her 1934 book, Patterns of Culture, did much to popularize the term in the United States. In it, she explained that:

The study of custom can be profitable only after certain preliminary propositions have been violently opposed. In the first place any scientific study requires that there be no preferential weighting of one or another items in the series it selects for its consideration. In all the less controversial fields like the study of cacti or termites or the nature of nebulae, the necessary method of study is to group the relevant material and to take note of all possible variant forms and conditions. In this way we have learned all that we know of the laws of astronomy, or of the habits of the social insects, let us say. It is only in the study of man himself that the major social sciences have substituted the study of one local variation, that of Western civilization.

Benedict was adamant that she was not romanticizing so-called primitive societies; she was emphasizing that any understanding of the totality of humanity must be based on as wide and varied a sample of individual cultures as possible. Moreover, it is only by appreciating a culture that is profoundly different from our own, that we can realize the extent to which our own beliefs and activities are culture-bound, rather than natural or universal. In this context, cultural relativism is a heuristic device of fundamental importance because it calls attention to the importance of variation in any sample that is used to derive generalizations about humanity.

== As a critical device ==
Marcus and Fischer's attention to anthropology's refusal to accept Western culture's claims to universality implies that cultural relativism is a tool not only in cultural understanding, but in cultural critique. This points to the second front on which they believe anthropology offers people enlightenment:

The other promise of anthropology, one less fully distinguished and attended to than the first, has been to serve as a form of cultural critique for ourselves. In using portraits of other cultural patterns to reflect self-critically on our own ways, anthropology disrupts common sense and makes us reexamine our taken-for-granted assumptions.

The critical function of cultural relativism is widely understood; philosopher John Cook observed that "It is aimed at getting people to admit that although it may seem to them that their moral principles are self-evidently true, and hence seem to be grounds for passing judgement on other peoples, in fact, the self-evidence of these principles is a kind of illusion." Cook recognizes the middle ground in between moral relativism and moral absolutism that cultural relativism straddles, remarking that the ensuing battlegrounds that arise tend to be in the domain of claims of self-evidence made on behalf of a people.

The critical function was indeed one of the ends to which Benedict hoped her own work would meet. The most famous use of cultural relativism as a means of cultural critique is Margaret Mead's research of adolescent female sexuality in Samoa. By contrasting the ease and freedom enjoyed by Samoan teenagers, Mead called into question claims that the stress and rebelliousness that characterize American adolescence is natural and inevitable.

As Marcus and Fischer point out, however, this use of relativism can be sustained only if there is ethnographic research in the United States comparable to the research conducted in Samoa. Although every decade has witnessed anthropologists conducting research in the United States, the very principles of relativism have led most anthropologists to conduct research in foreign countries.

== Comparison to moral relativism ==
According to Marcus and Fischer, when the principle of cultural relativism was popularized after World War II, it came to be understood "more as a doctrine, or position, The principle of cultural relativity does not mean that because the members of some savage tribe are allowed to behave in a certain way that this fact gives intellectual warrant for such behavior in all groups. Cultural relativity means, on the contrary, that the appropriateness of any positive or negative custom must be evaluated with regard to how this habit fits with other group habits. While breeding a healthy scepticism as to the eternity of any value prized by a particular people, anthropology does not as a matter of theory deny the existence of moral absolutes. Rather, the use of the comparative method provides a scientific means of discovering such absolutes. If all surviving societies have found it necessary to impose some of the same restrictions upon the behavior of their members, this makes a strong argument that these aspects of the moral code are indispensable.

Although Kluckhohn was using language that was popular at the time (e.g. "savage tribe") but which is now considered antiquated and coarse by most anthropologists, his point was that although moral standards are rooted in one's culture, anthropological research reveals that the fact that people have moral standards is a universal. He was especially interested in deriving specific moral standards that are universal, although few if any anthropologists think that he was successful.

There is an ambiguity in Kluckhohn's formulation that would haunt anthropologists in the years to come. It makes it clear that one's moral standards make sense in terms of one's culture. He waffles, however, on whether the moral standards of one society could be applied to another. Four years later American anthropologists had to confront this issue head-on.

=== Vertical and horizontal relativism ===
It was James Lawrence Wray-Miller who provided an additional clarification tool, or caveat, of the theoretical underpinnings of cultural relativism by dividing it into two binary, analytical continuums: vertical and horizontal cultural relativism. Ultimately, these two analytical continuums share the same basic conclusion: that human morality and ethics are not static but fluid and vary across cultures depending on the time period and current condition of any particular culture.

Vertical relativism describes that cultures, throughout history (vertical—i.e., passage through past and future), are products of the prevailing societal norms and conditions of their respective historical periods. Therefore, any moral or ethical judgments, made during the present, regarding past cultures' belief systems or societal practices must be firmly grounded and informed by these norms and conditions to be intellectually useful. Vertical relativism also accounts for the possibility that cultural values and norms will necessarily change as influencing norms and conditions change in the future.

Horizontal relativism describes that cultures in the present (horizontal in time—i.e., the present period of the culture) are products of the prevailing norms and conditions developed as a result of their unique geographies, histories, and environmental influences. Therefore, moral or ethical judgments, made during the present, regarding a current culture's belief system or societal practices must account for these unique differences to be intellectually useful.

=== Statement on human rights ===
The transformation of cultural relativism as a heuristic tool into the doctrine of moral relativism occurred in the context of the work of the Commission of Human Rights of the United Nations in preparing the Universal Declaration of Human Rights (1948).

Melville J. Herskovits prepared a draft "Statement on Human Rights" which Executive Board of the American Anthropological Association revised, submitted to the Commission on Human Rights, and then published. The statement begins with a fairly straightforward explanation of the relevance of cultural relativism:

The problem is thus to formulate a statement of human rights that will do more than phrase respect for the individual as individual. It must also take into full account the individual as a member of a social group of which he is part, whose sanctioned modes of life shape his behavior, and with whose fate his own is thus inextricably bound.

The bulk of this statement emphasizes concern that the Declaration of Human Rights was being prepared primarily by people from Western societies, and would express values that, far from being universal, are really Western:

Today the problem is complicated by the fact that the Declaration must be of world-wide applicability. It must embrace and recognize the validity of many different ways of life. It will not be convincing to the Indonesian, the African, the Chinese, if it lies on the same plane as like documents of an earlier period. The rights of Man in the Twentieth Century cannot be circumscribed by the standards of any single culture, or be dictated by the aspirations of any single people. Such a document will lead to frustration, not realization of the personalities of vast numbers of human beings.

Although this statement could be read as making a procedural point (that the Commission must involve people of diverse cultures, especially cultures that had been or are still under European colonial or imperial domination), the document ended by making two substantive claims:

1. Even where political systems exist that deny citizens the right of participation in their government, or seek to conquer weaker peoples, underlying cultural values may be called on to bring the peoples of such states to a realization of the consequences of the acts of their governments, and thus enforce a brake upon discrimination and conquest.
2. Worldwide standards of freedom and justice, based on the principle that man is free only when he lives as his society defines freedom, that his rights are those he recognizes as a member of his society, must be basic.

These claims provoked an immediate response by a number of anthropologists. Julian Steward (who, as a student of Alfred Kroeber and Robert Lowie, and as a professor at Columbia University, was situated firmly in the Boasian lineage) suggested that the first claim "may have been a loophole to exclude Germany from the advocated tolerance", but that it revealed the fundamental flaw in moral relativism:

"Either we tolerate everything, and keep hands off, or we fight intolerance and conquest—political and economic as well as military—in all their forms." Similarly, he questioned whether the second principle means that anthropologists "approve the social caste system of India, the racial caste system of the United States, or many other varieties of social discrimination in the world."

Steward and others argued that any attempt to apply the principle of cultural relativism to moral problems would only end in contradiction: either a principle that seems to stand for tolerance ends up being used to excuse intolerance, or the principle of tolerance is revealed to be utterly intolerant of any society that seems to lack the (arguably, Western) value of tolerance. They concluded that anthropologists must stick to science, and engage in debates over values only as individuals.

== Governmental usage ==
Several countries have used cultural relativism as a justification for limiting the rights in the Universal Declaration of Human Rights, despite the World Conference on Human Rights rejecting it as a refutation of human rights violations.

A 2011 study by international legal expert Roger Lloret Blackburn, examining the Universal Periodic Reviews, distinguishes several different groups of nations:

- One group consists of nations where the current regime has been installed by revolution, and that deny the need for political plurality: China, Vietnam, Myanmar, Cuba, and Iran.
- Another group are certain Islamic nations that adhere to sharia and certain traditional practices: Yemen, Iran, Saudi Arabia, Pakistan.
- A third possible group is nations that give special rights to specific groups: Malaysia, Mexico, Indonesia, and Colombia.

== Criticism ==
Cultures differ in values, practices, and outcomes — some prioritize individual liberty, others collective harmony; some advance scientific inquiry, others may suppress it. These differences can lead to measurable disparities in things like human rights, economic prosperity, or technological development.

The debate over the "Statement on Human Rights", then, was not merely over the validity of cultural relativism, or the question of what makes a right universal. It forced anthropologists to confront the question of whether anthropological research is relevant to non-anthropologists. Although Steward and Barnett seemed to be suggesting that anthropology as such should restrict itself to purely academic affairs, people within and without the academy have continued to debate the ways non-anthropologists have used this principle in public policy concerning ethnic minorities or in international relations.

Political scientist Alison Dundes Renteln has argued that most debates over moral relativism misunderstand the importance of cultural relativism. Most philosophers understand the Benedictine–Herskovitz formulation of cultural relativism to mean:

[W]hat is right or good for one individual or society is not right or good for another, even if the situations are similar, meaning not merely that what is thought right or good by one is not thought right or good by another...but that what is really right or good in one case is not so in another.

Although this formulation clearly echoes the kinds of example anthropologists used in elaborating cultural relativism, Renteln believes that it misses the spirit of the principle. Accordingly, she supports a different formulation: "there are or can be no value judgements that are true, that is, objectively justifiable, independent of specific cultures."

Renteln faults philosophers for disregarding the heuristic and critical functions of cultural relativism. Her main argument is that in order to understand the principle of cultural relativism, one must recognize the extent to which it is based on enculturation: "the idea that people unconsciously acquire the categories and standards of their culture." This observation, which echoes the arguments about culture that originally led Boas to develop the principle, suggests that the use of cultural relativism in debates of rights and morals is not substantive but procedural. That is, it does not require a relativist to sacrifice his or her values. But it does require anyone engaged in a consideration of rights and morals to reflect on how their own enculturation has shaped their views:

There is no reason why the relativist should be paralyzed, as critics have often asserted. But a relativist will acknowledge that the criticism is based on his own ethnocentric standards and realizes also that the condemnation may be a form of cultural imperialism.

Renteln thus bridges the gap between the anthropologist as scientist (whom Steward and Barnett felt had nothing to offer debates on rights and morality) and as private individual (who has every right to make value judgements). The individual keeps this right, but the scientist requires that the individual acknowledge that these judgements are neither self-evident universals, nor entirely personal (and idiosyncratic), but rather took form in relation to the individual's own culture.

=== Post-colonial politics ===
Boas and his students understood anthropology to be a historical, or human science, in that it involves subjects (anthropologists) studying other subjects (humans and their activities), rather than subjects studying objects (such as rocks or stars). Under such conditions, it is fairly obvious that scientific research may have political consequences, and the Boasians saw no conflict between their scientific attempts to understand other cultures, and the political implications of critiquing their own culture. For anthropologists working in this tradition, the doctrine of cultural relativism as a basis for moral relativism was anathema. For politicians, moralists, and many social scientists (but few anthropologists) who saw science and human interests as necessarily independent or even opposed, however, the earlier Boasian principle of cultural relativism was anathema. Thus, cultural relativism came under attack, but from opposing sides and for opposing reasons.

=== Political critique ===
On the one hand, many anthropologists began to criticize the way moral relativism, in the guise of cultural relativism, is used to mask the effects of Western colonialism and imperialism. Thus, Stanley Diamond argued that when the term "cultural relativism" entered popular culture, popular culture co-opted anthropology in a way that voided the principle of any critical function:

Relativism is the bad faith of the conqueror, who has become secure enough to become a tourist. Cultural relativism is a purely intellectual attitude; it does not inhibit the anthropologist from participating as a professional in his own milieu; on the contrary, it rationalizes that milieu. Relativism is self-critical only in the abstract. Nor does it lead to engagement. It only converts the anthropologist into a shadowy figure, prone to newsworthy and shallow pronouncements about the cosmic condition of the human race. It has the effect of mystifying the profession, so that the very term anthropologist ("student of man") commands the attention of an increasingly "popular" audience in search of novelty. But the search for self-knowledge, which Montaigne was the first to link to the annihilation of prejudice, is reduced to the experience of culture shock, a phrase used by both anthropologists and the State Department to account for the disorientation that usually follows an encounter with an alien way of life. But culture shock is a condition one recovers from; it is not experienced as an authentic redefinition of the personality but as a testing of its tolerance ... The tendency of relativism, which it never quite achieves, is to detach the anthropologist from all particular cultures. Nor does it provide him with a moral center, only a job.

George Stocking summarized this view with the observation that "Cultural relativism, which had buttressed the attack against racialism, [can] be perceived as a sort of neo-racialism justifying the backward techno-economic status of once colonized peoples."

=== Defence by Clifford Geertz ===
By the 1980s many anthropologists had absorbed the Boasian critique of moral relativism, and were ready to reevaluate the origins and uses of cultural relativism. In a distinguished lecture before the American Anthropological Association in 1984, Clifford Geertz claimed that the critics of cultural relativism did not really understand, and were not really responding to, the ideas of Benedict, Herskovits, Kroeber and Kluckhohn. Consequently, the various critics and proponents of cultural relativism were talking past one another. What these different positions have in common, Geertz argued, is that they are all responding to the same thing: knowledge about other ways of life.

The supposed conflict between Benedict's and Herskovits's call for tolerance and the untolerant passion with which they called for it turns out not to be the simple contradiction so many amateur logicians have held it to be, but the expression of a perception, caused by thinking a lot about Zunis and Dahomys, that the world being so full of a number of things, rushing to judgement is more than a mistake, it is a crime. Similarly, Kroeber's and Kluckholn's verities – Kroeber's were mostly about messy creatural matters like delirium and menstruation, Kluckholn's were mostly about messy social ones like lying and killing within the in-group, turn out not to be just the arbitrary personal obsessions they so much look like, but the expression of a much vaster concern, caused by thinking a lot about anthrōpos in general, that if something isn't anchored everywhere nothing can be anchored anywhere. Theory here – if that is what these earnest advices about how we must look at things if we are to be accounted as decent should be called – is more an exchange of warnings than an analytical debate. We are being offered a choice of worries. What the relativists – so-called – want us to worry about is provincialism – the danger that our perceptions will be dulled, our intellects constricted, and our sympathies narrowed by the overlearned and overvalued acceptances of our own society. What the anti-relativists – self-declared – want us to worry about, and worry about and worry about, as though our very souls depended on it, is a kind of spiritual entropy, a heat death of the mind, in which everything is as significant, and thus as insignificant, as everything else: anything goes, to each his own, you pays your money and you takes your choice, I know what I like, not in the couth, tout comprendre, c'est tout pardonner.

Geertz concludes this discussion by commenting, "As I have already suggested, I myself find provincialism altogether the more real concern so far as what actually goes on in the world." Geertz' defense of cultural relativism as a concern which should motivate various inquiries, rather than as an explanation or solution, echoed a comment Alfred Kroeber made in reply to earlier critics of cultural relativism, in 1949:

Obviously, relativism poses certain problems when from trying merely to understand the world we pass on to taking action in the world: and right decisions are not always easy to find. However, it is also obvious that authoritarians who know the complete answers beforehand will necessarily be intolerant of relativism: they should be, if there is only one truth and that is theirs. I admit that hatred of the intolerant for relativism does not suffice to make relativism true. But most of us are human enough for our belief in relativism to be somewhat reinforced just by that fact. At any rate, it would seem that the world has come far enough so that it is only by starting from relativism and its tolerations that we may hope to work out a new set of absolute values and standards, if such are attainable at all or prove to be desirable.

== See also ==
- Age of consent
- Cultural Revolution
- Emotivism
- Ethnocentrism
- Emic and etic
- Food and drink prohibitions
- Global justice
- Historical particularism
- Human cannibalism
- Human Sacrifice
  - Child sacrifice
- Intercultural competence
- LGBTQ rights by country or territory
- Moral relativism
- Moral nihilism
- Multiculturalism
- Political correctness
- Paradox of tolerance
- Relativism
- Sick Societies
- Situational ethics
- Taboo
- Universality (philosophy)
- Xenocentrism
- Cultural diplomacy
