= Armed Forces Museum (Ghana) =

Military historical museum in Kumasi, Ghana

The Armed Forces Museum
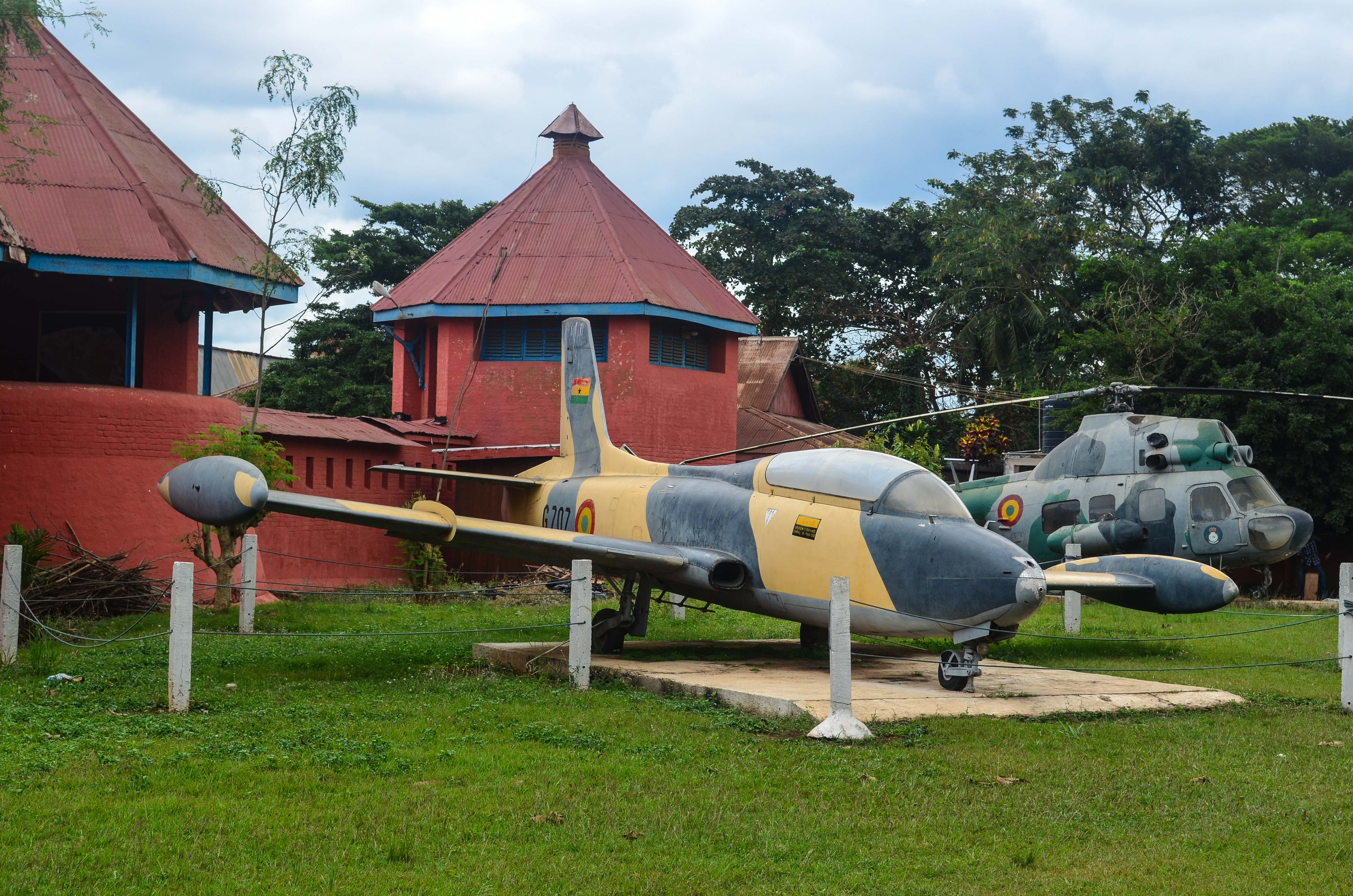
- An Aermacchi MB-326 jet and Mil Mi-2 helicopter at the Armed Forces Museum
- Established: 1953; 73 years ago
- Location: Kumasi, Ghana
- Coordinates: 6.6913673°N 1.6248718°W
- Type: Military history museum
- Collections: military equipment, artefacts and objects used in the Anglo-Ashanti Wars
- Owner: Ministry of Defence, Ghana

The Armed Forces Museum, also known as the Kumasi Fort, is a military history museum located in a former British colonial military fort in Kumasi, Ghana. The museum was established in 1953.

== History ==
The Kumasi Fort which houses the museum was originally built as a British military fort and colonial governor's residence in 1896-7, following the end of the Fourth Anglo-Ashanti War.

Rubble remains of the former Aban Palace which had been destroyed by British forces in 1874 during the Third Anglo-Ashanti War was used to construct the fort in Kumasi. An armed rebellion against the British in 1896 led to a destruction of the fort and a replacement by 1897.

In March 1900, Yaa Asantewaa (along with other rebels) attacked and besieged the Kumasi Fort with 10,000-20,000 troops during the War of the Golden Stool, trapping 29 Europeans and 700 Hausa troops in the fort for several weeks. On the 23rd of June most of the occupants, led by the Governor Frederick Hodgson, succeeded in escaping from the fort and breaking through the Ashanti lines, reaching the British Cape Coast on the 10th of July. A force of 100 Hausa and 3 British men remained behind in the fort with rations to last three weeks. On the 15th of July a relief force of 60 British officers and 1000 West African troops arrived at Kumasi and put an end the siege, liberating the remaining occupants. 50 years later, from 1952 to 1953, the fort was taken over by the Ghana Regiment and converted into a museum.

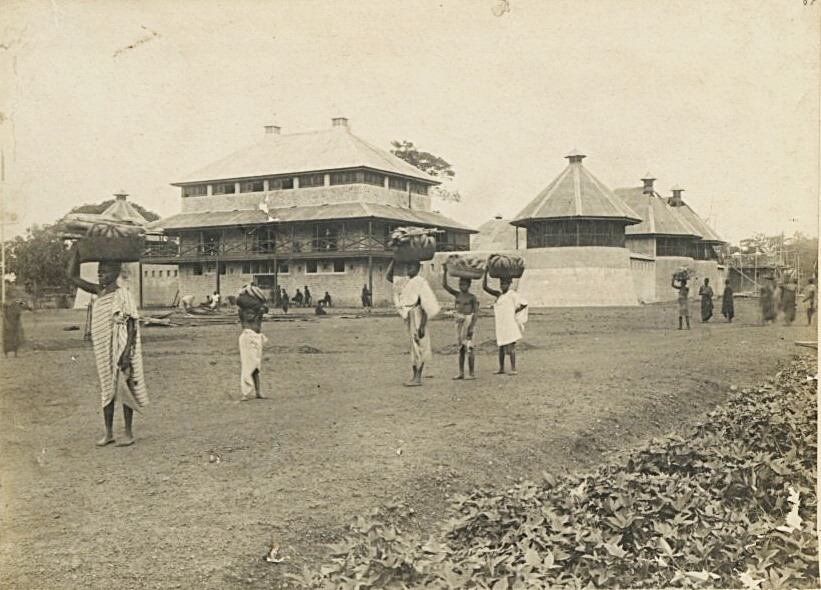
The Kumasi Fort, built by the British in 1896-7

Colourized photo of the Kumasi Fort

Newspaper article on the siege and liberation of the Kumasi Fort in 1900

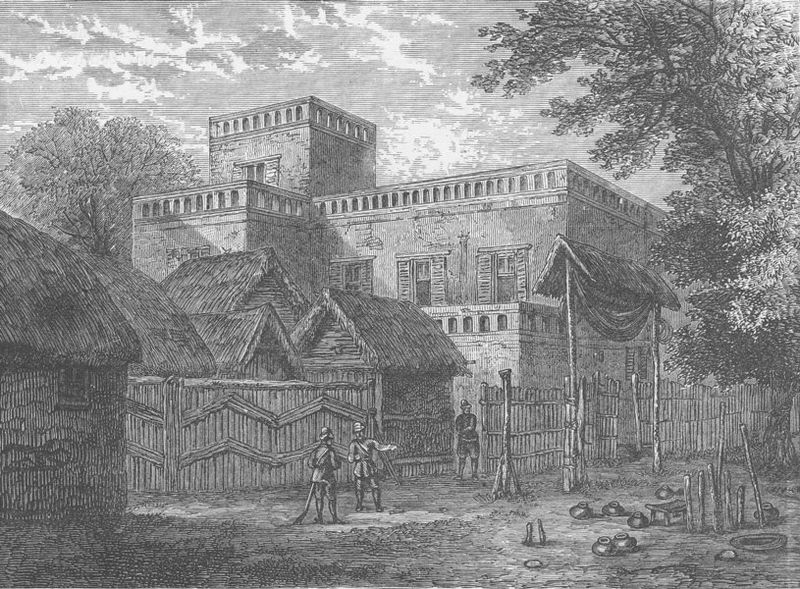
Drawing of the Aban Palace destroyed in 1874

== Exhibitions ==
The museum mainly focused on showcasing military equipment, artefacts and objects used in the later half of the Anglo-Ashanti Wars. Its collection contains military medals, armoured cars, anti-aircraft guns, and photographs and portraits.

The first hall, located close to the entrance of the museum, showcases weapons used by the Gold Coast army during World War II, including medals awarded by the 4th (Gold Coast) Infantry Brigade. Other showcases included captured weapons, photographs and maps from conflicts in the Congo, Myanmar, and Lebanon. Objects related to the Anglo-Ashanti Wars are also included at the display. In the second hall, situated in the rear guard tower, displayed human bones and rifle stocks collected during the construction of a lorry park in Kumasi.

In the third hall, next to the previous hall, showcases a collection of portraits of the Royal West African Frontier Force and the Gold Coast force. The second-to-final hall also showcases portraits of Prempeh I, Prempeh II and Yaa Asantewaa while the final hall displayed military company flags, the flag of the Gold Coast and the Ghanaian flag.

== Gallery ==
Armed Forces Museum

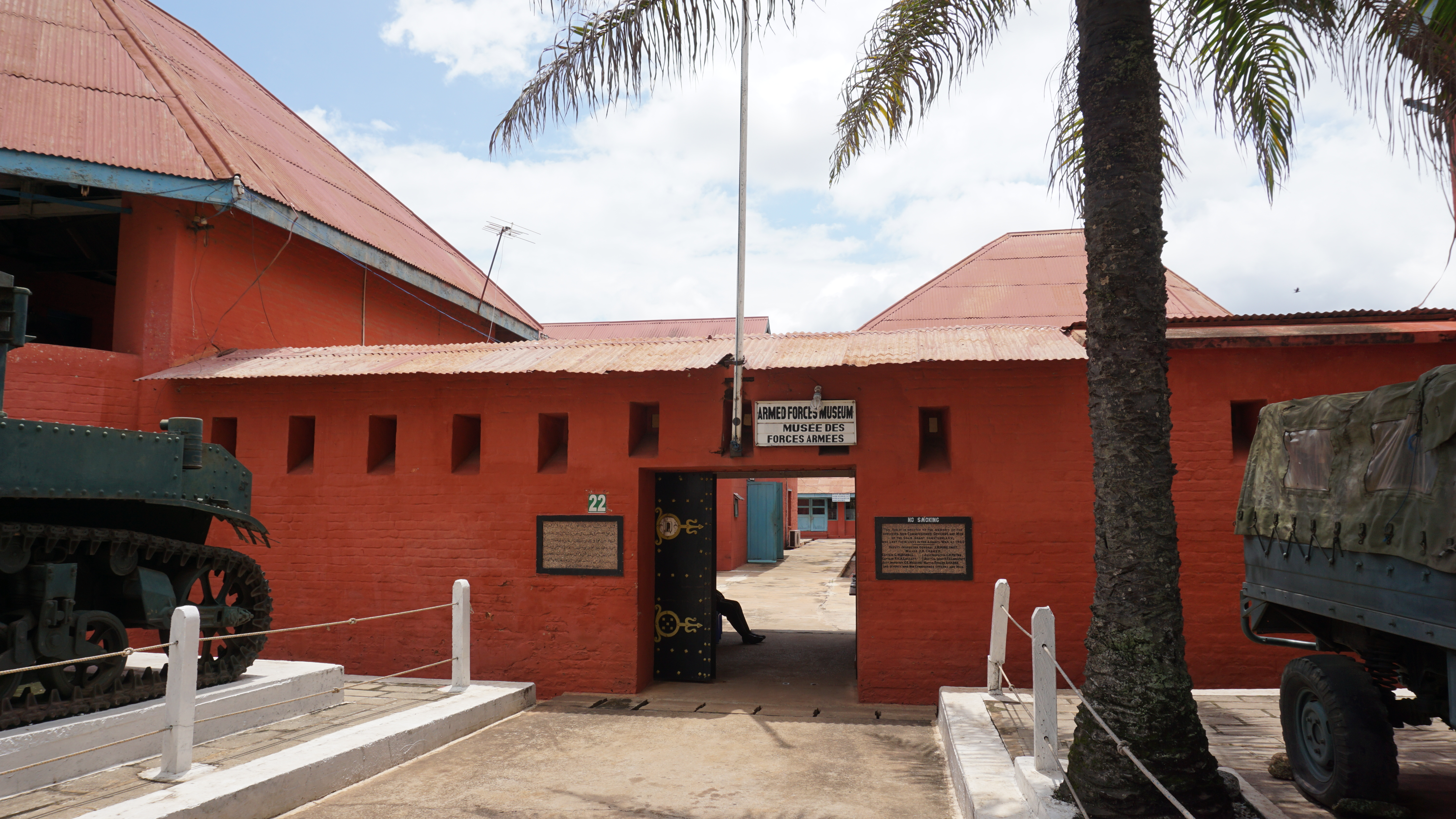
Entrance to the Fort/Museum

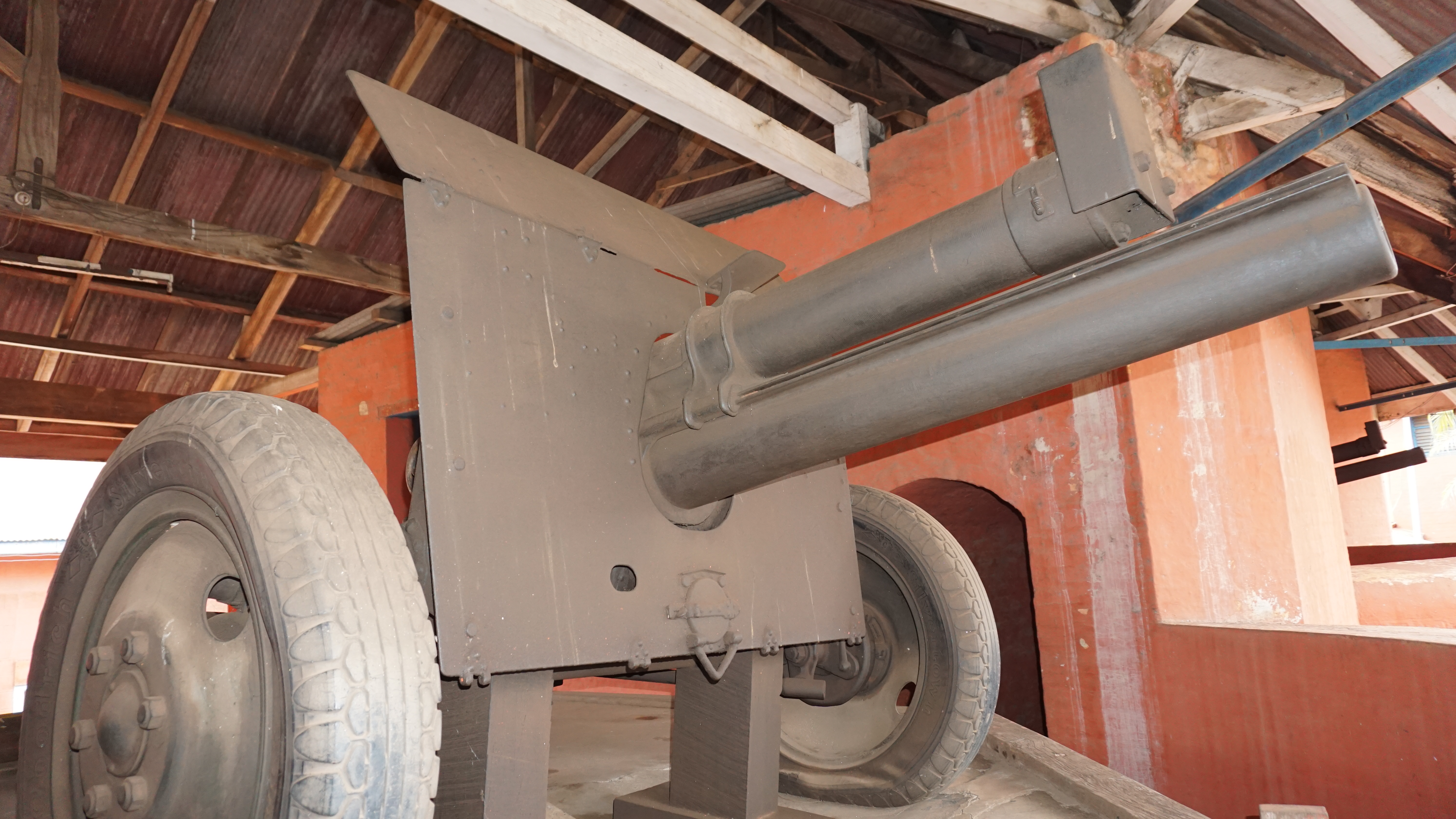
Field gun

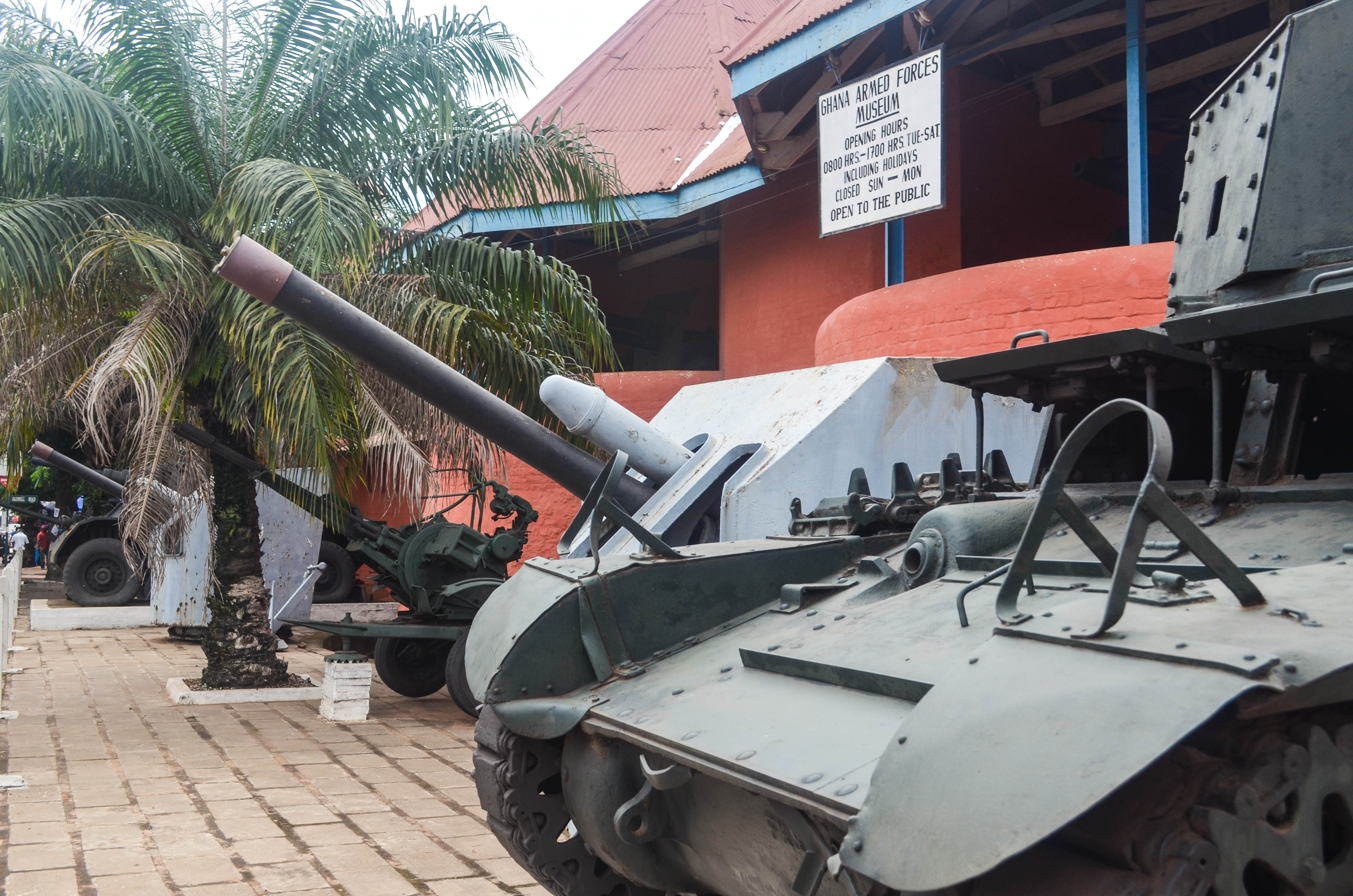
Armoured fighting vehicles and Combat vehicles located at the front of the museum

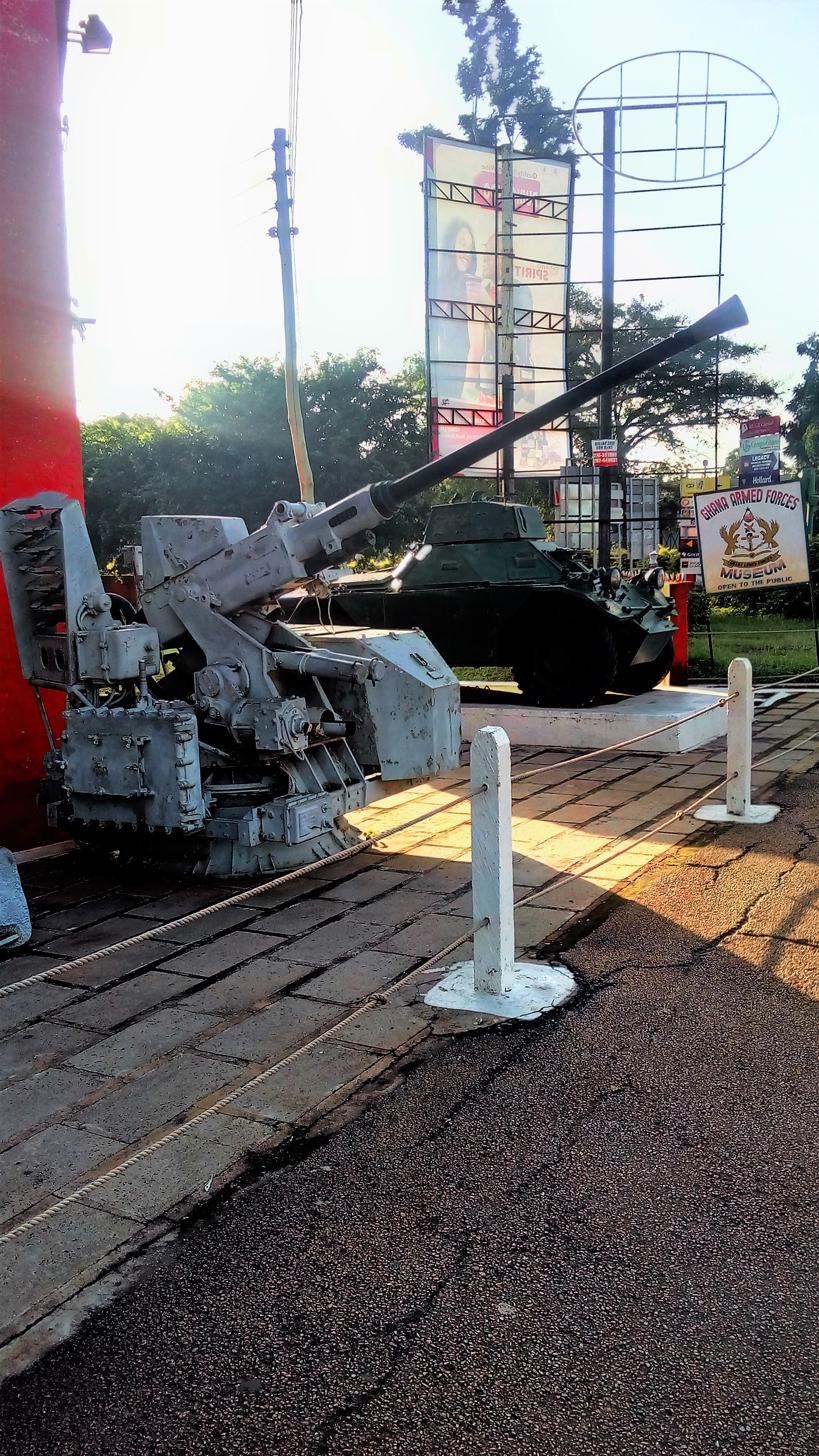
Autocannon displayed at the museum

== See also ==
- List of museums in Ghana
- History of Kumasi
