= Alan Dundes =

American folklorist (1934–2005)

- Born: September 8, 1934; New York City, U.S.
- Died: March 30, 2005 (aged 70); Berkeley, California, U.S.
- Spouse: Carolyn
- Children: 3

Education
- Education: Yale University; Indiana University Bloomington

Philosophical work
- Institutions: University of Kansas; University of California, Berkeley

Alan Dundes (September 8, 1934 – March 30, 2005) was an American folklorist whose four-decade tenure at the University of California, Berkeley, helped define folkloristics as an academic discipline. Obituaries remembered him as the most renowned folklorist of his time and noted his authorship of 12 books, two dozen edited volumes, and more than 250 articles interpreting myth, proverb, and folk belief. Dundes advanced psychoanalytic and structural readings of folklore and urged colleagues to pair collection with theory in delineating the field. His willingness to probe national character and popular ritual, including a controversial 1980 address on German culture and a psychoanalytic study of American football, drew both acclaim and death threats.

== Career ==
Dundes attended Yale University, where he studied English. Sure that he would be drafted upon completion of his studies, Dundes joined the Reserve Officers' Training Corps and trained to become a naval communications officer. When it turned out that the ship he was to be posted to, stationed in the Bay of Naples, already had a communications officer, Dundes asked what else that ship might need, not wanting to give up such a choice assignment. He then spent two years maintaining artillery on a ship in the Mediterranean. Upon completion of his service, Dundes attended Indiana University Bloomington to pursue a Ph.D. in folklore. At Indiana, he studied under the folklorist Richard Dorson. He completed his degree very quickly and went on to a teaching position at the University of Kansas where he stayed for only a year before being offered a position in the anthropology department of the University of California, Berkeley, in 1963. He quickly established himself as a prominent name within folkloristics. Dundes held this position for 42 years, until his death in 2005.

His presidential speech at the American Folklore Society conference in 1980 argued that there was an anal-erotic fixation in the German national character; this generated significant controversy. He introduced the concept "allomotif" (coined in an analogy with "allomorph", to complement the concept of "motifeme" (cf. "morpheme") introduced by Kenneth L. Pike) to be used in the analysis of the structures of folktales in terms of motifs identified in them.

He has been described as "widely credited with helping to shape modern folklore scholarship", and as "one of the most admired and influential folklorists in the world". He wrote 12 books, both academic and popular, and edited or co-wrote two dozen more and is credited with authoring over 250 articles. One of his most notable articles was called "Seeing is Believing" in which he indicated that Americans value the sense of sight more than the other senses.

=== Teaching methods ===
Known unofficially as the "Jokes Professor" at University of California, Berkeley, his classes were very popular, combining learning with "an irresistible wit and style". In this introductory course, students were introduced to the many various forms of folklore, from myth, legend, and folktale to proverbs and riddles to jokes, games, and folkspeech (slang), to folk belief and foodways. The final project for this course required that each student collect, identify, and analyze 40 items of folklore. All of this material (about 500,000 items) is housed and cataloged in the Berkeley Folklore Archives. Dundes also taught undergraduate courses in American folklore, and psychoanalytic approaches to folklore (his favorite approach) in addition to graduate seminars on the history of folkloristics, from an international perspective, and the history and progression of folklore theory.

Dundes frequently gave the opening address for the New Student Orientation Program at University of California, Berkeley, (CalSO) during summer orientation programs, including jokes and stories.

== Controversy ==
Strongly opinionated, Dundes was not at all averse to the controversy that his theories often generated. He dealt frequently with folklore as an expression of unconscious desires and anxieties and was of the opinion that if people reacted strongly to what he had to say, he had probably hit a nerve and was probably on to something. Some of his more controversial work involved examining the New Testament and the Qur'an as folklore.

However, of all his articles, the one that earned him death threats was "Into the Endzone for a Touchdown", an exploration via psychoanalysis of what he contended was the homoerotic subtext inherent in the terminology and rituals surrounding American football. In 1980, Dundes was invited to give the presidential address at the American Folklore Society annual meeting. His presentation, later published as a monograph titled Life is Like a Chicken Coop Ladder, uses folkspeech, customs, material culture, and so forth seeking to demonstrate an anal-erotic fixation in German national character. Reaction to this paper was incredibly strong. Dundes did not participate in the American Folklore Society annual conference for many years. When he finally participated again, in 2004, he again gave a plenary address, this time taking his fellow folklorists to task for being weak on theory. In his opinion, the presentation of data, no matter how thorough, is useless without the development and application of theory to that data. It is not enough to simply collect; one must do something with what one has collected. In 2012, linguist Anatol Stefanowitsch credited Dundes with having given rise to a still prevalent "stereotype about Germany as a culture enamored with excretion", but called Life is Like a Chicken Coop Ladder, "unstructured, poorly argued and flimsily sourced" and "methodologically flawed because he only looked for evidence supporting his theory, and not – as even a folklorist should – for evidence against his theory".

=== Endowment of a professorship ===
Dundes fiercely defended the importance of the discipline of folkloristics throughout his career. Towards the end of his life, he received an envelope containing a check from a former student, which he asked his wife to open. She read the figure out as $1,000. In fact, the check was for $1,000,000. This money allowed Dundes to endow the university with a Distinguished Professorship in Folkloristics, thereby ensuring that upon his retirement folklore would not be abandoned in the department.

The former student and benefactor wished to remain anonymous. Apparently they called the university prior to the donation to find out if Dundes was still teaching, or as Dundes told it, "to see if I was still alive." The student mentioned that they intended to send a check, but Dundes said he was not sure the student would follow through.

The check was made out to the university, Dundes said, but with instructions that he could use it in any manner he saw fit.

"I could just take all my students to Fiji and have one hell of a party," he said.

The professor instead decided to invest it in the study of folklore. The money funds a Distinguished Professorship of Folkloristics and helps fund the university's folklore archives and provides grants for folklore students.

=== Interview by Flemming ===
Shortly before his death, Dundes was interviewed by filmmaker Brian Flemming for his documentary, The God Who Wasn't There. He prominently recounted Lord Raglan's 22-point scale from his 1936 book The Hero, in which he ranks figures possessing similar divine attributions. An extended interview is on the DVD version of the documentary.

== Influence ==
Dundes is often credited with the promotion of folkloristics as a term denoting a specific field of academic study and applies instead what he calls a "modern" flexible social definition for folk: two or more persons who have any trait in common and express their shared identity through traditions. Dundes explains this point in The Devolutionary Premise in Folklore Theory (1969):

"A folk or peasant society is but one example of a 'folk' in the folkloristic sense. Any group of people sharing a common linking factor, e.g., an urban group such as a labor union, can and does have folklore. 'Folk' is a flexible concept which can refer to a nation as in American folklore or to a single family. The critical issue in defining 'folk' is: what groups in fact have traditions?" (emphasis in the original, see footnote 34, 13)

With this expanded social definition of folk, a wider view of the material considered to be folklore also emerged that includes, as William Wilson points out, "things people make with words (verbal lore), things they make with their hands (material lore), and things they make with their actions (customary lore)" (2006, 85).

Another implication of this broader defining of the term folk, according to Dundes, is that folkloristic work is interpretative and scientific rather than descriptive or devoted solely to folklore preservation. In the 1978 collection of his academic work, Essays in Folkloristics, Dundes declares in his preface, "Folkloristics is the scientific study of folklore just as linguistics is the scientific study of language. [. . .] It implies a rigorous intellectual discipline with some attempt to apply theory and method to the materials of folklore" (vii). In other words, Dundes advocates the use of folkloristics as the preferred term for the academic discipline devoted to the study of folklore.

According to folklorist William A. Wilson, "the study of folklore, therefore, is not just a pleasant pastime useful primarily for whiling away idle moments. Rather, it is centrally and crucially important in our attempts to understand our own behavior and that of our fellow human beings" (2006, 203).

== Honors ==
In 1966 Dundes was awarded a Guggenheim Fellowship and in 1972 was named a senior fellow of the National Endowment for the Humanities.

In 1980 Dundes served as president of the American Folklore Society and in 1993 he was awarded the Pitrè Prize, an international lifetime achievement award in folklore.

Dundes was elected a member of the American Academy of Arts and Sciences in 2001 - the first Folklorist to be recognized in this way.

The range and influence of Dundes's scholarship was recognised in the publication of three different festschrift collections - one by proverb scholars, one by psychoanalysts and one from his former students.

== Personal life ==
Dundes was born in New York City, the son of a lawyer and a musician. His parents were not religious, and Dundes considered himself a secular Jew.

He met his wife Carolyn while attending Yale University. They were married for 48 years, and had a son (David) two daughters (Lauren and Alison) and six grandchildren."

On March 30, 2005, Dundes collapsed from an apparent heart attack while giving a graduate seminar at University of California, Berkeley, and died on the way to the hospital. He was 70.

== Selected works ==
- Carl R. Pagter (Co-author). Never Try to Teach a Pig to Sing.
- (1964)."The Morphology of North American Indian Folktales".
- (Ed.) (1965). The Study of Folklore.
- (1968). "The Number Three in American Culture." In Alan Dundes (ed.), Every Man His Way: Readings in Cultural Anthropology. Englewood Cliffs, New Jersey: Prentice-Hall.
- (1969). "Thinking Ahead: A Folkloristic Reflection of the Future Orientation in American Worldview".
- (1971). "A Study of Ethnic Slurs".
- (1972). "Folk Ideas as Units of Worldview".
- (1975). "Slurs International: Folk Comparisons of Ethnicity and National Character".
- (1980). Interpreting Folklore. Indiana University Press.
- (1984). Life is Like a Chicken Coop Ladder: A Portrait of German Culture Through Folklore.
- (Ed.) (1984). Sacred Narrative: Readings in the Theory of Myth. University of California Press.
- Falassi, Alessandro (co-author) (1984). La terra in Piazza: An interpretation of the Palio in Siena. University of California Press.
- (with C. Banc) (1986) "First Prize: Fifteen Years. An Annotated Collection of Political Jokes" ISBN 0-8386-3245-9
- (1987). Cracking Jokes: Studies of Sick Humor Cycles & Stereotypes. Ten Speed Press.
- Carl R. Pagter (Co-author) (1987). When You're Up to Your Ass in Alligators...: More Urban Folklore from the Paperwork Empire. Wayne State University Press.
- (Ed.) (1989). Little Red Riding Hood: A Casebook. Madison, Wisconsin: University of Wisconsin Press.
- (Ed.) (1990). In Quest of the Hero. Princeton University Press.
- (Ed.) (1991). Mother Wit from the Laughing Barrel: Readings in the Interpretation of Afro-American Folklore. University Press of Mississippi.
- (1991) The Blood Libel Legend: A Casebook in Anti-Semitic Folklore. University of Wisconsin Press
- (Ed.) (1992). The Evil Eye: A Casebook. University of Wisconsin Press.
- Carl R. Pagter (Co-author). (1992) Work Hard and You Shall Be Rewarded: Urban Folklore From the Paperwork Empire. ISBN 978-0814324325
- (1993). Folklore Matters. University of Tennessee Press.
- (Ed.) (1994). The Cockfight: A Casebook. University of Wisconsin Press.
- Edmunds, Lowell (Co-editor.) (1995). Oedipus: A Folklore Casebook. University of Wisconsin Press.
- Carl R. Pagter(Co-Author) (1996). Sometimes the Dragon Wins: Yet More Urban Folklore from the Paperwork Empire. Syracuse University Press.
- (Ed.) (1996). The Walled-Up Wife: A Casebook. University of Wisconsin Press.
- (1997). From Game to War and Other Psychoanalytic Essays on Folklore. University of Kentucky Press.
- (1997). Two Tales of Crow and Sparrow: A Freudian Folkloristic Essay on Caste and Untouchability. Rowman & Littlefield.
- (Ed.) (1998). The Vampire: A Casebook. Madison, Wisconsin: The University of Wisconsin Press.
- Carl R. Pagter (Co-author) (2000). Why Don't Sheep Shrink When It Rains?: A Further Collection of Photocopier Folklore. Syracuse University Press.
- (1999). Holy Writ as Oral Lit: The Bible as Folklore. Rowman & Littlefield Publishers, Inc.
- (2002). Bloody Mary in the Mirror: Essays in Psychoanalytic Folkloristics. University Press of Mississippi.
- (2003). The Shabbat Elevator and Other Sabbath Subterfuges. Rowman & Littlefield.
- (2003). Fables of the Ancients?: Folklore in the Qur'an. Rowman & Littlefield.
- (2003). Parsing Through Customs: Essays by a Freudian Folklorist. The University of Wisconsin Press.
- (2004). "As the Crow Flies: A Straightforward Study of Lineal Worldview in American Folk Speech".
- (Ed.) (2005). Recollecting Freud. Madison, Wisconsin: The University of Wisconsin Press.
