= Alison Dundes Renteln =

American college professor (born 1960)

- Born: January 9, 1960 (age 66)
- Education: Harvard University (BA); University of California, Berkeley (MA, PhD); University of Southern California (JD)
- Occupation: professor
- Spouse: Paul A. Renteln
- Children: 2

Alison Dundes Renteln (born January 9, 1960) is an American college professor. She is a Professor of Political Science, Anthropology, Law, and Public Policy at the University of Southern California.

== Education ==
She holds a B.A. (History and Literature) from Harvard-Radcliffe, a J.D. from USC's Gould School of Law, and a Ph.D. in Jurisprudence & Social Policy and M.A. from the University of California, Berkeley. From 1981 to 1982 she studied International Law at the London School of Economics.

== Career ==
From 1986 to 1987 she served as a lecturer and later acting director of the Law & Society Program within the Department of Political Science at the University of California, Santa Barbara. She joined the faculty at the University of Southern California in 1987. From 1987 to 1993 she was an Assistant Professor of Political Science and from 1993 to 2003 she was an Associate Professor of Political Science. Since 2003 she has been a Professor of Political Science. She served as Vice Chair of the Department of Political Science from 1995 to 2002, 2005 to 2007, and 2009 to 2011. She served as Interim Chair of the Department of Political Science from 2011 to 2012. From 1995 to 1996 and from 2005 to 2007 she served as acting director and later director of the Jesse M. Unruh Institute of Politics. From 2009 to 2010 she served as president of the Phi Kappa Phi university-wide honor society. She is the author of The Cultural Defense (2004) which was first book-length study which provides a comprehensive overview of the debate surrounding the admissibility of cultural evidence in the courtroom. Renteln contends that the cultural defense should, in both criminal and civil matters, be given formal recognition.

In Fall 2023, Renteln received the USC College Raubenheimer award for excellence in research, teaching, and service.

Renteln received a Council on Foreign Relations International Affairs Fellowship for 2024 to 2025.

== Personal life ==
Alison is married to Paul A. Renteln and they have two children.

She is also the daughter of folklorist Alan Dundes.
