= Densinkran =

Densinkran is the hairstyle worn by queen mothers and women of the Ashanti people in Ghana. It is a short cut and the edges of the head and hair are dyed with charcoal or black dye.

== History ==
The Asantes were defeated by an alliance of the British with Ga-Adangbe, Fanti, Denkyira and Akyems at Katamanso. The Densinkran was introduced to mourn the Asante dead in the Katamanso.The name dubbed "Gyese Nkran" (except Akra) in local parlance vulgarized as Densinkran.

The only other women who wear this cut are elderly women and who are part of the royal family. The hair in African culture is very emotive and symbolic to identity.

== Significance ==
It serves as hairstyle for royal identity

A funeral hairstyle

It communicates one status, rank and ethnic identity in a community
