= Capture of Kumasi (1874) =

- Part of Third Anglo-Ashanti War
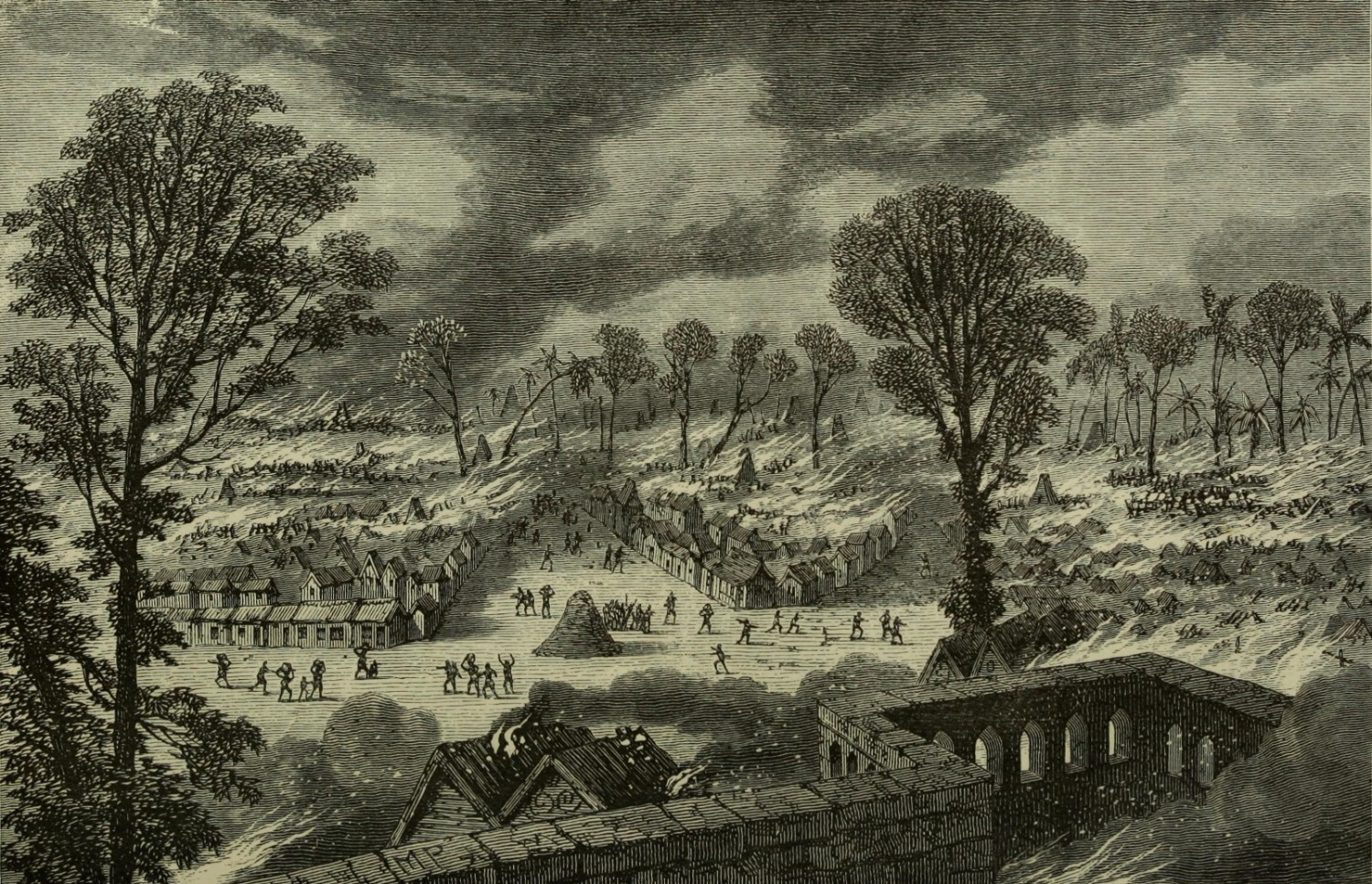
- Burning of Coomassie (British engraving, 1874)
| Date | 4–6 February 1874 |
| Location | Kumasi, Asante Empire (present-day Ghana) |
| Result | British victory and destruction of the city |

Belligerents
| United Kingdom | Ashanti Empire |

Commanders and leaders
| (United Kingdom) Sir Garnet Wolseley | Kofi Karikari |

Units involved
| 42nd Regiment of Foot ? | |

Strength
| about 2,000 Europeans and natives | ? |

Casualties and losses
| none | unknown |

The Capture of Kumasi or the Burning of Kumasi occurred between 4 and 6 February 1874 as the final action of the Third Anglo-Ashanti War in Kumasi, the capital of the Asante Empire. British forces commanded by Sir Garnet Wolseley took the city without resistance and started a massive punitive action including the demolition of the Aban royal palace and burning down of a huge part of the city.

== Prelude ==
As a reaction on the Asante military invasion of 1873 on the ground of British Gold Coast, in April 1873 British military command appointed General Garnet Wolseley to lead an expedition force of 2,500 British soldiers and several thousand West Indian and African troops (including some Fante) to stop the hostile actions. Deployment reached the Cape Coast port in January 1874 and started their move to the north, with the Asante capital of Kumasi, seat of the king Kofi Karikari, as a main target. After Asante refusal of the British ultimatum, on 29 January skirmishes started culminating in a decisive battle of Amoaful on 31 January, ending up as a decisive triumph of technologically more advanced British troops.

== Taking the city ==
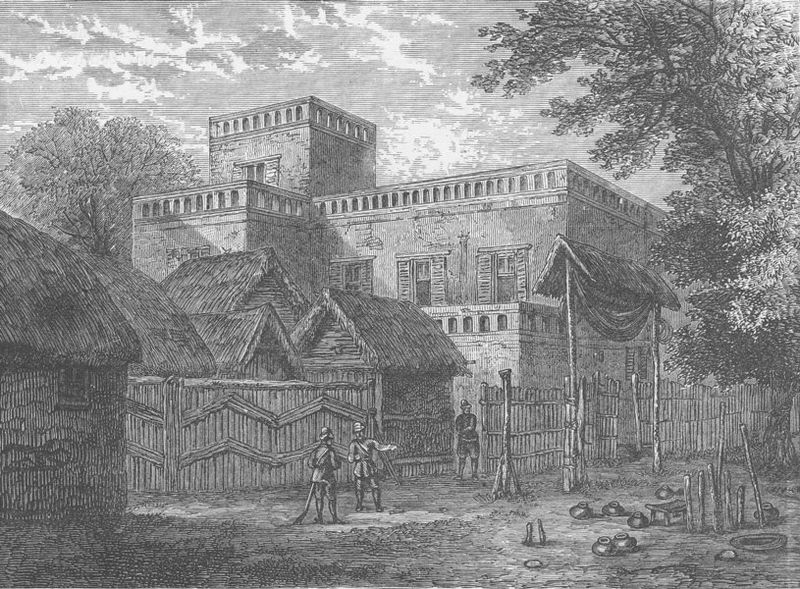
British soldiers in front of the Aban Palace (British engraving, c. 1874)

On 4 February 1874 British troops, mainly composed of the 42nd Regiment of Foot and Royal Marines, reached the city of Kumasi. As the city had been abandoned by the Ashanti, it was taken without any resistance. British troops entered the royal palace to realize the king and his court left the city to hide in the bush. During the search in the palace British found an extraordinary number of antiquities, Moorish and Asante artwork pieces, valuable weapons and also a large library of books in various languages. Instead of continuing the campaign and pursuing the king Kofi and his remaining troops, Wolseley and his staff decided to proceed with an act of sophisticated destruction of Kumasi.

While moving out the valuables from the royal palace to seize them or just let them be thrown away on the ground, on 6 February British military engineers planted the explosives around the royal palace and carried out its demolition. The rest of the city buildings, mainly consisting from wood and other flammable natural materials, were then set on fire by British troops.

Action was described by press correspondents of multiple newspapers like The Times, Daily Telegraph, Daily News or Manchester Guardian, who were present during the event.

== Aftermath ==
Capture of Kumasi was seen as a resolute British military and political success which marked the resolute moment of the Third Anglo-Ashanti War. Vast of the items from the royal palace and other places of Kumasi brought by the Wolseley expedition were then sold on a auction in Cape Coast. King Kofi, forced by the circumstances, signed the peace Treaty of Fomena in July 1874, in October of the same year he was dethroned. British position in present-day Ghana then kept to grow stronger against the state of Asante, one of the biggest African states remaining sovereign on the continent during the Scramble for Africa.
