= Sick Societies =

1992 book by Robert B. Edgerton

Sick Societies—Challenging the myth of primitive harmony
- Author: Robert B. Edgerton
- Language: English
- Subject: Anthropology, Cultural relativism, Social science
- Publisher: New York University Free Press, Simon and Schuster
- Publication date: 1992, 2010
- Pages: 288
- ISBN: 978-0-029-089255

Sick Societies is a 1992 scholarly work by Professor Emeritus of the department of anthropology at the University of California, Robert B. Edgerton.

== Synopsis ==
The book challenges the cultural relativist position of some earlier anthropologists. Edgerton enumerates examples of primitive cultures and practices, showing that they have neither been completely happy nor environmentally sustainable. He argues that the vision of primal, naturally adaptive, perfect societies, is a myth. Praising how relativists were instrumental to the development of respect for other peoples and values, he also points out where this can conflict with science. (Note: "'The relativists' insistence on respect for the values of other people,' he writes, 'has undoubtedly done more good for human dignity than it has done harm to science.' Harm, nevertheless, it has done.") According to Edgerton, the "interpretivist" view that science or Western society cannot, or should not, critically evaluate other societies would be a type of "intellectual onanism".

Examples of imperfect pre-colonial indigenous societies are presented, which include instances of superstitious flawed causation that can result in conflict and violence, suboptimal medicine, poor diet, environmental destruction, the subjugation of women, exploitation, slavery, dysfunctional relationships and an atmosphere of fear. Edgerton reports on how members of small societies have themselves criticized them, that all societies have their malfunctions and can be evaluated for health.

== Reviews ==
Anthropology professor Philip Kilbride, writing for American Anthropologist, praised the book as "momentous, if not dialectically unevitable", and "a compelling case for his call for an 'anthropology of evaluation'", recommending it to students as a companion to Richard Shweder's 1991 Thinking Through Cultures book that by contrast is a defense of postmodernist relativism discouraging cross-cultural comparison. He enumerated a few societal problems described in the book, like widow burning, foot binding, malnutrition, female genital mutilation, tribal warfare and alcoholism. His review concluded by describing Edgerton as a skillful writer committed to scientific empiricism.

Anthropology professor David Kertzer, writing for The Washington Post, sympathized with the effort, considering how other societies were classically romanticized by anthropologists, but criticized the book for often selecting examples that were not necessarily representative of small primitive societies. He also argued that Edgerton's account of native American alcoholism did not convincingly support his main thesis.

== See also ==
- Noble savage

== Footnotes ==
Notes

Further reading

- Kapac, Jack (July 2016). "Book Review: Sick Societies: Challenging the Myth of Primitive Harmony, by Robert B. Edgerton. New York: Free Press, 1992". Critical Sociology. Sage. doi:10.1177/089692059502100214.
- Bennett, John W. (5 July 2010). "Walks on the dark side: "Sick societies," Interpersonal violence, and anthropology's love affair with the folk society". Reviews in Anthropology. doi:10.1080/00988157.1995.9978123.
- Martin-Gorski, Darla (May 2002). "Sick Societies and Islamic Nations" (PDF). Buffalo Ontology Site.
- "Sick Societies by Robert B. Edgerton". ThriftBooks.
