= Aban Palace =

Aban
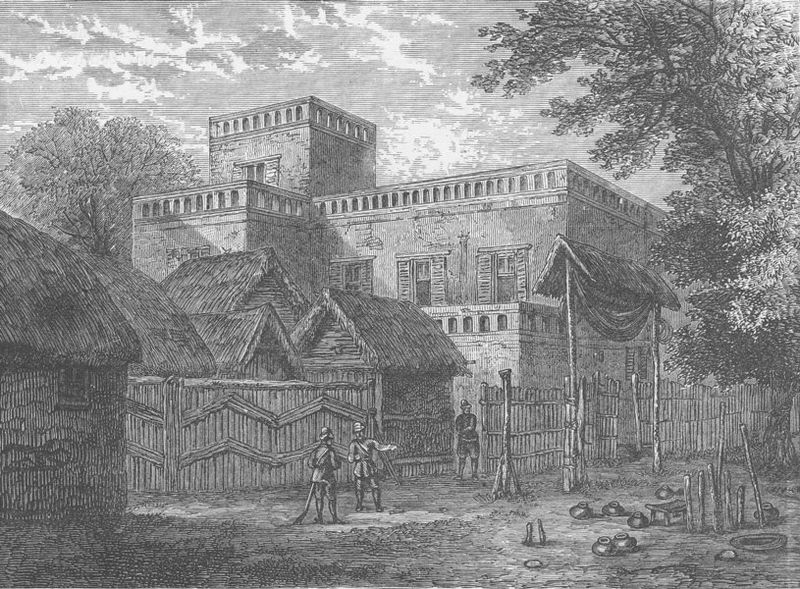
- Aban in 1874

General information
- Status: Destroyed
- Type: Palace
- Location: Ashanti Empire, Kumasi
- Completed: 1822
- Destroyed: 1874

Technical details
- Material: stone
- Floor count: 2

The Aban was a stone structure that served as a palace for the Asantehene and played the other function of displaying his craft collection. It was constructed in 1822 as a project of Asantehene Osei Bonsu, with the stones and labor provided by the Dutch at Elmina. The palace was destroyed in 1874 during the British invasion and destruction of Kumasi, its remains were used to construct a British fort in 1896 (the Kumasi Fort).

== History ==
The Aban Palace was completed in 1822 by Osei Bonsu. According to Wilks, the project was influenced by the British museum. The major sections of the palace served to display the Asantehene's collection of arts and crafts while one part housed the wine store. The Aban was situated in the palace complex. Osei Kwadwo was the first Asantehene to express interest in the construction of a personal residence in the form of a palace. During the war against Gyaman from 1818-19, Osei Bonsu had the interest of constructing a personal residence. In 1817, Thomas Edward Bowdich noted that all the captains were to "be presented" with a significant amount from the public treasury for "adorning or enlarging his house." Bonsu was intrigued with English architecture and was given drawings of English buildings by Thomas Bowdich in 1817. The construction was also inspired by European castles located on the coast such as Cape Coast Castle. In 1820, Joseph Dupuis witnessed the Ashanti "castle" under construction. According to Joseph Dupuis, Osei Bonsu stated:

“I am building a fort like Cape Coast Castle; but I shall make it very high that I may look out and see all the town … That building you see is to be made very grand. The inside shall be gold, ivory, and brass … all the black countries may know I am a great king here. Now white men know me, I must live in a great house as white kings do."

The Dutch at Elmina provided the stones and labour for the construction of the building, including Fante stonemasons. Osei Bonsu justified the use of this labour force by stating "Asantees are fools at work; they can only fight." The building was completed in 1822.

In 1841 during a visit to the Aban, Thomas Birch Freeman documented that;

We entered a court yard, ascended a flight of stone steps, and passed through an ante-room into a small hall, in which were tastefully arranged on tables thirty-one gold-handled swords. In the same room were several of the King's calabashes, overlaid with gold, out of which he drinks palm-wine. Passing into another room, we found the King seated in company with Osai Kujoh, and attended by Apoko, and other linguists. On tables in different part of the room various articles manufactured in glass were arranged, such candle-shades, beautifully cut glass tumblers, wine-glasses, etc., time-pieces, covered with glass-shedes, etc.; and almost every piece was decorated with golden ornaments of various descriptions (Note: Perrot provides Freeman's description in full.)...

— Freeman 1841

Freeman also writes that other structures besides the Aban were made of wood and swish. By the mid 19th century, the building fell into disrepair and Asantehene Kofi Karikari made attempts to renovate. In 1874 amid the British occupation of Kumasi, Winwood Reade of the London Times described the top floor as;

The rooms upstairs remind me of Wardour Street. Each was a perfect Old Curiosity Shop. Books in many languages, Bohemian glass, clocks, silver plate, old furniture, Persian rugs, Kidderminster carpets, pictures and engravings, numberless chests and coffers...With these were many specimens of Moorish and Ashanti handicraft

— Winwood Reade

F. Boyle of the Daily Telegraph called the structure a museum, stating "the museum, for museum it should be called...where the art treasures of the monarchy were stored." The Aban was destroyed in 1874 following British conquest at the end of the Third Anglo-Ashanti War.

Wilks adds that destruction of the Aban and the sack of Kumasi possibly led to the elimination of Ashanti's Muslim annals on the ruling Oyoko dynasty. Stone remains of the palace were used to construct a British fort in 1896-7, known as the Kumasi Fort. The fort survives today as the Armed Forces Museum.
