= Culture of Ghana =

Ghana is a country of 33.48 million people and many native groups, such as:

- The Akans in the center and South of the country,
- The Ga and Adangbe in, around, and East of Accra,
- The Guan people in the rainforest,
- The Dagombas, Mamprusi, and related peoples in the North,
- The Gurunsi languages speaking peoples in the far North,
- The Gonjas in the Northern Region.

English is the official language, with the indigenous Twi of the Ashantis, the Fante language, and the Akwapem language (https://en.wikipedia.org/wiki/Akuapem_people), Frafra, Dangme, Ga, Dagbani, Mampruli, Gonja, and Ewe also having official status, and being taught in schools as indigenous (local) languages in the respective areas where they are predominant.

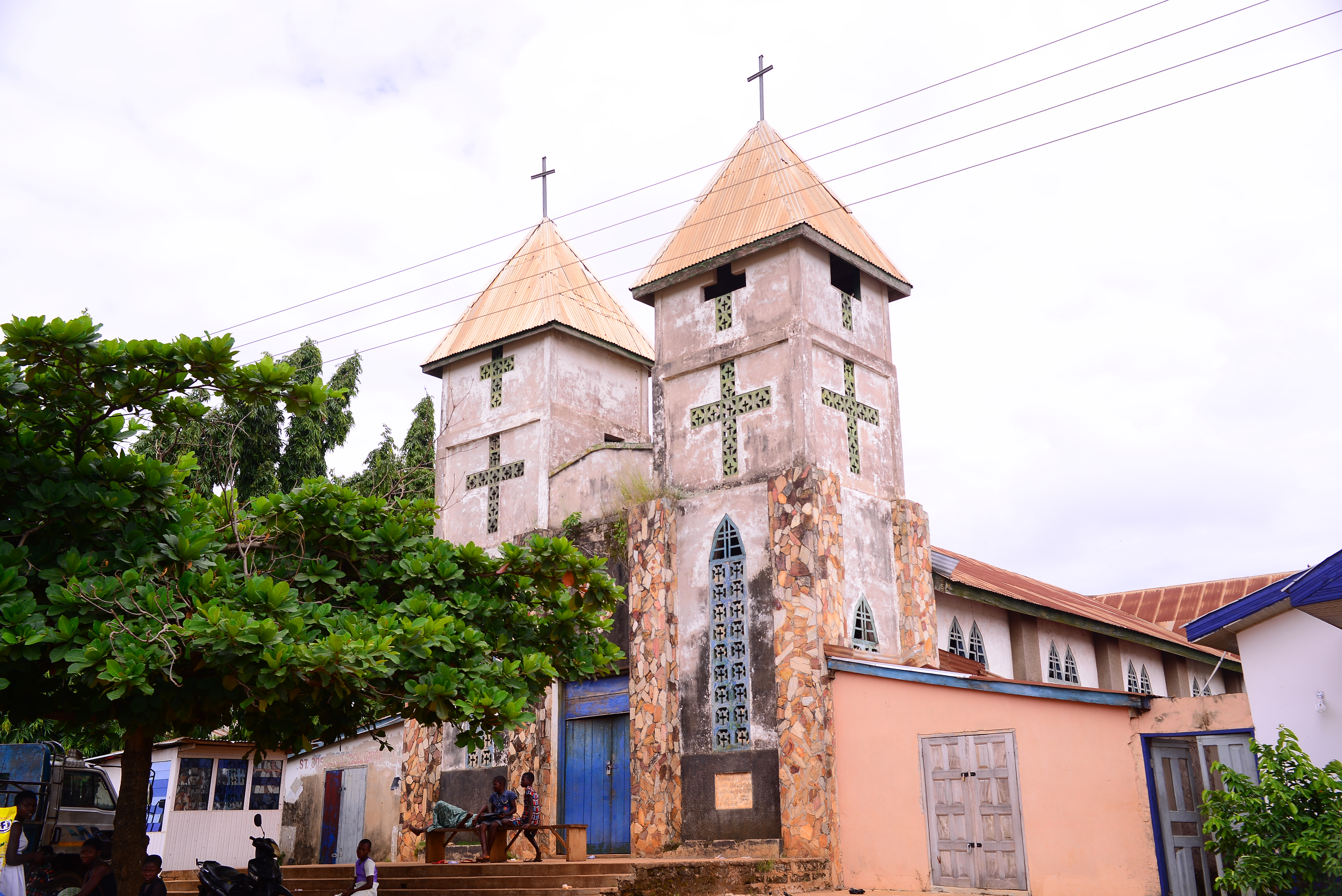
Presbyterian Church in Ghana

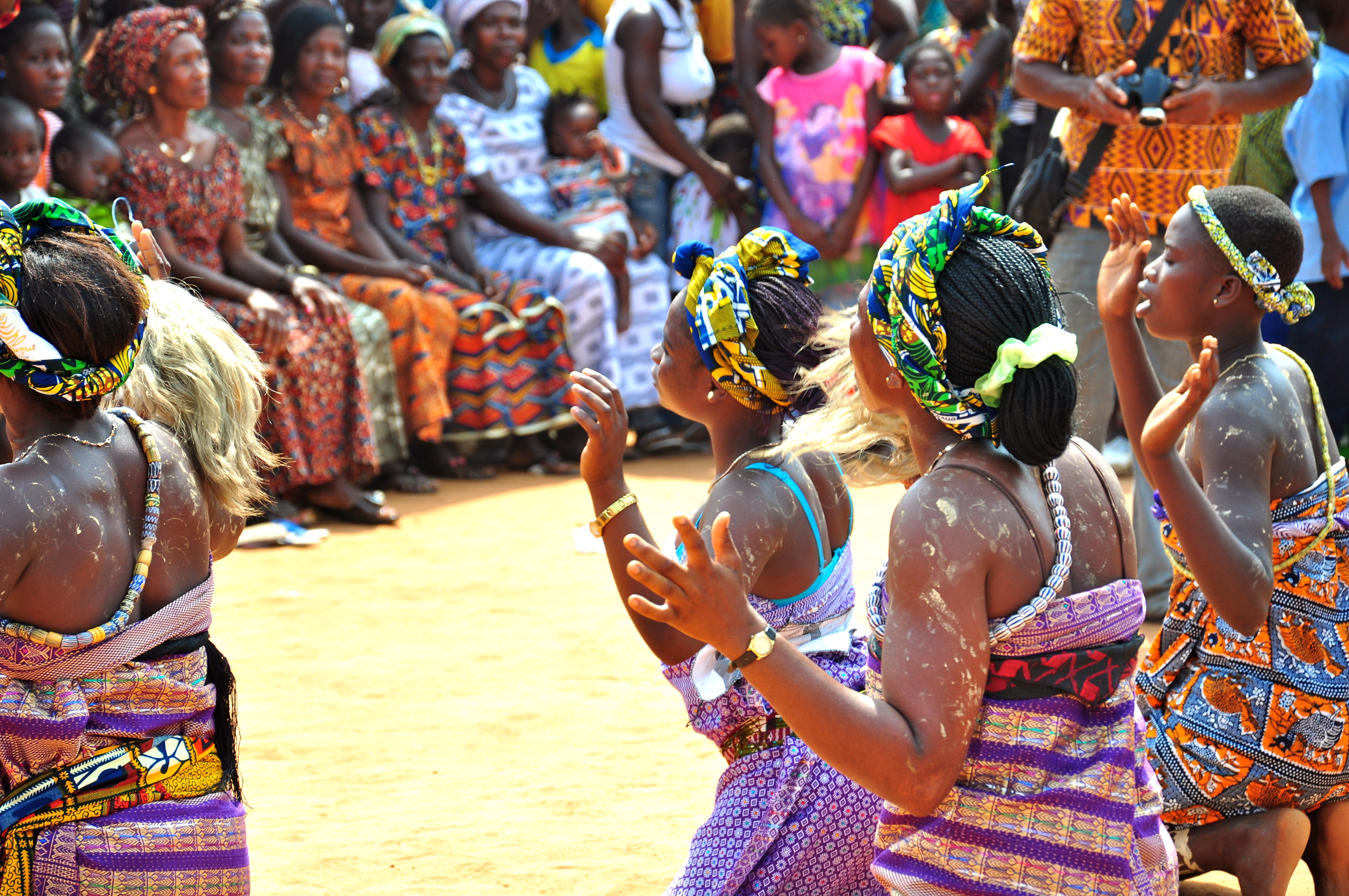
Ghanaian women dancing at an event to raise awareness about healthy behaviours

== People ==
=== Akans ===
The Akan people primarily live in Ghana, parts of Ivory Coast, and Togo. They are one of the few matrilineal societies in West Africa. The Akan matrilineal system continues to be economically and politically important. Each lineage controlled the land farmed by its members, functioned as a religious unit in the veneration of its ancestors, supervised marriages, and settled internal disputes among its members.

Once renowned for their splendor and wealth, the Akan kings retained dignitary status after colonization. Celebration of the Akan kings lives on in the tradition of the Golden Stool. The Akan are noted for their expertise in several forms of craftwork, particularly their weaving, wood carving, ceramics, fertility dolls, metallurgy, and kente cloth). Traditional kente cloth is woven outdoors, exclusively by men, in complex patterns of bright, narrow strips. The manufacturing of many Akan crafts is restricted to male specialists. Pottery-making is the only craft that is primarily a female activity; men usually fashion pots or pipes depicting anthropomorphic or zoomorphic figures.

The various Akan groups speak various dialects of the Akan language, a language rich in proverbs, the use of proverbs is considered a sign of wisdom. Euphemisms are also very common, especially concerning events connected with death.

The coastal Akans were the first to have relations with Europeans during the "Scramble for Africa". As a result of this long association, these groups absorbed aspects of British culture and language. For example, it became customary among these peoples to adopt British surnames. The coastal Akans live predominantly in the Central Region and Western Region of Akanland.

=== Ga-Adangbe ===
The Ga-Adangbe people or simply Ga people (named for the common proto-Ga-Adangbe ancestral language) inhabit the Greater Accra Region. The Ga-Adangde have different but common languages, Ga, Krobo, Sh3, Osudoko, Shai, Gbugblaa, and Ada, Ningo to mention a few. The Adangbe inhabit the eastern plain, while the Ga groups occupy the western portions of the Accra coastlands. Both languages are derived from a common root language, and modern Ga and Adangbe languages are still similar today.

Despite the archeological evidence that proto-Ga-Adangbe-speakers relied on millet and yam cultivation, the modern Ga-Adangbe reside in what used to be fishing communities, and more than 75 percent of the Ga-Adangbe live in urban centers. The presence of major industrial, commercial, and governmental institutions in the city and towns, as well as the increasing migration of other people into the area, has not prevented the Ga people from maintaining aspects of their traditional culture, even though Twi is an important immigrant language in their lands.

=== Dagomba ===
The Dagomba speak the Dagbani language and live in the Kingdom of Dagbon. The kingdom is the earliest in Ghana. For centuries, the area inhabited by Dagomba peoples has been the scene of movements of people engaged in conquest, expansion, and north–south and east–west trade. Many terms from Arabic, Hausa, and Dyula are seen in the Dagbani language, due to the importance of trans-saharan trade and West African trade and the historic impact that the Islamic religion has had in the area. The Dagomba kingdom has a defined system of governance. The paramount chief of the Dagomba kingdom bears the title Ya-Naa. The system is meritocratic and promotional. To become the Ya-Na, a candidate must usually have occupied one of the three "gate" skins: Karaga, Savelugu, or Mion. This "gate" system ensures that only experienced sub-chiefs ascend to the highest office.

=== Ewé ===
The Ewe people occupy southeastern Ghana and parts of neighboring Togo and Benin. The Ewe follow a patrilineal structure, meaning that the founder of a community becomes chief and is usually succeeded by his paternal relatives. Ewe religion is organized around a creator or deity, Mawu, and over 600 other deities. The Ewe are more traditionally inclined in terms of religion and belief. Many village celebrations and ceremonies take place in honor of one or more deities.

Coastal Ewe depend on the fishing trade, while inland Ewe are usually farmers and keep livestock. The local variations in economic activities have led to craft specialization. The Ewe also weave kente cloth, often in geometrical patterns and symbolic designs that have been handed down through the ages.

== Role and status of women ==
Women in pre-modern society were seen as bearers of children, retailers of fish, and farmers. Traditionally, women's childbearing abilities were perceived as a way for lineage ancestors to be reborn. In pre-colonial times, polygamy was encouraged, especially by wealthy men. In patrilineal societies, dowry received from marrying off daughters was traditionally seen as an acknowledgment to parents for raising their daughters well. In the last couple of decades, female gender roles have evolved tremendously. Ghanaian women now account for 43.1% of the working class in Ghana. Females have climbed to the upper leadership echelons of politics, career, business, and all other sectors. Notable political personalities include Joyce Bamford-Addo (Speaker of the 5th Session of the Parliament), Georgina Theodora Wood (Chief Justice) as well as multiple past and current political office holders.

== Festival ==
The Akwasidae Festival (alternate, Akwasiadae) is celebrated by the Ashanti people and chiefs in Ashanti, as well as the Ashanti diaspora. The festival is celebrated on a Sunday, once every six weeks. The Panafest celebrates roots, and African Americans with roots from the region, often visit and celebrate their heritage. Ashanti Yam Festival is observed for five days starting with a Tuesday, as dictated by the local chief priest. It marks the first harvest of yams during autumn, after the monsoon season. This festival has both religious and economic significance. Religiously, the festival is used to thank the gods and the ancestors for the new harvest and to traditionally outdoor the new yam.

The Damba festival is celebrated by the people of Dagbon and other ethnic groups in Ghana. During this festival, there is a colorful and vibrant display of the Ghanaian Smock and other traditional dresses.

Also, the Fire festival is celebrated during the first month of the Dagomba lunar calendar. This festival takes place at night and involves fire procession and drumming and dancing to war songs.

When the first yam tubers are harvested, the people of Dagbon mark a ceremony to declare the opening of the yam season.

== Music ==
There are three distinct types of music: ethnic or traditional music, normally played during festivals and at funerals; "highlife" music, which is a blend of traditional and 'imported' music; and choral music, which is performed in concert halls, churches, schools, and colleges.°

== Dance ==
Each ethnic group has its traditional dances, with specific dances for different occasions. Some of these specific dances are meant for funerals, celebrations, storytelling, praise, and worship. There are various dances in Ghana performed by the sixteen regions across the country, most frequently during festivals and occasions such as funerals, marriage ceremonies, etc. These dances are performed to entertain and educate people. ( e.g. The 'Gome' dance, as performed by the Gas of the Greater Accra region of Ghana during the Homowo festival in August). Other dances in Ghana include Kpanlogo performed by the Gas, Agbadza by the Ewes, Adowa by the Akans, Bambaya by the Northerners, Patsa and Dbahsh by the Ga-Adangbes, and many others. Many dances have originated from Ghana and its ethnic groups.

== Customs ==
Funerals and libations are poured. African time is practiced. Sexuality is not discussed in Ghana. Being Left handed is frowned upon.

== Superstition ==
Black magic belief is strong. Ghanaian churches openly promote the idea that disease and misfortune can be caused by supernatural forces. Superstition is so strong women who are accused of witchcraft are banished to Witch camps.

== Religion ==
Ghana is a highly religious country where evangelical prophets are extremely popular.

== Cuisine ==
The cuisine has diverse traditional dishes from each ethnic group. Generally, most dishes consist of a starchy portion, and a sauce or soup, with fish, snails, meat, or mushrooms.

== Sport ==
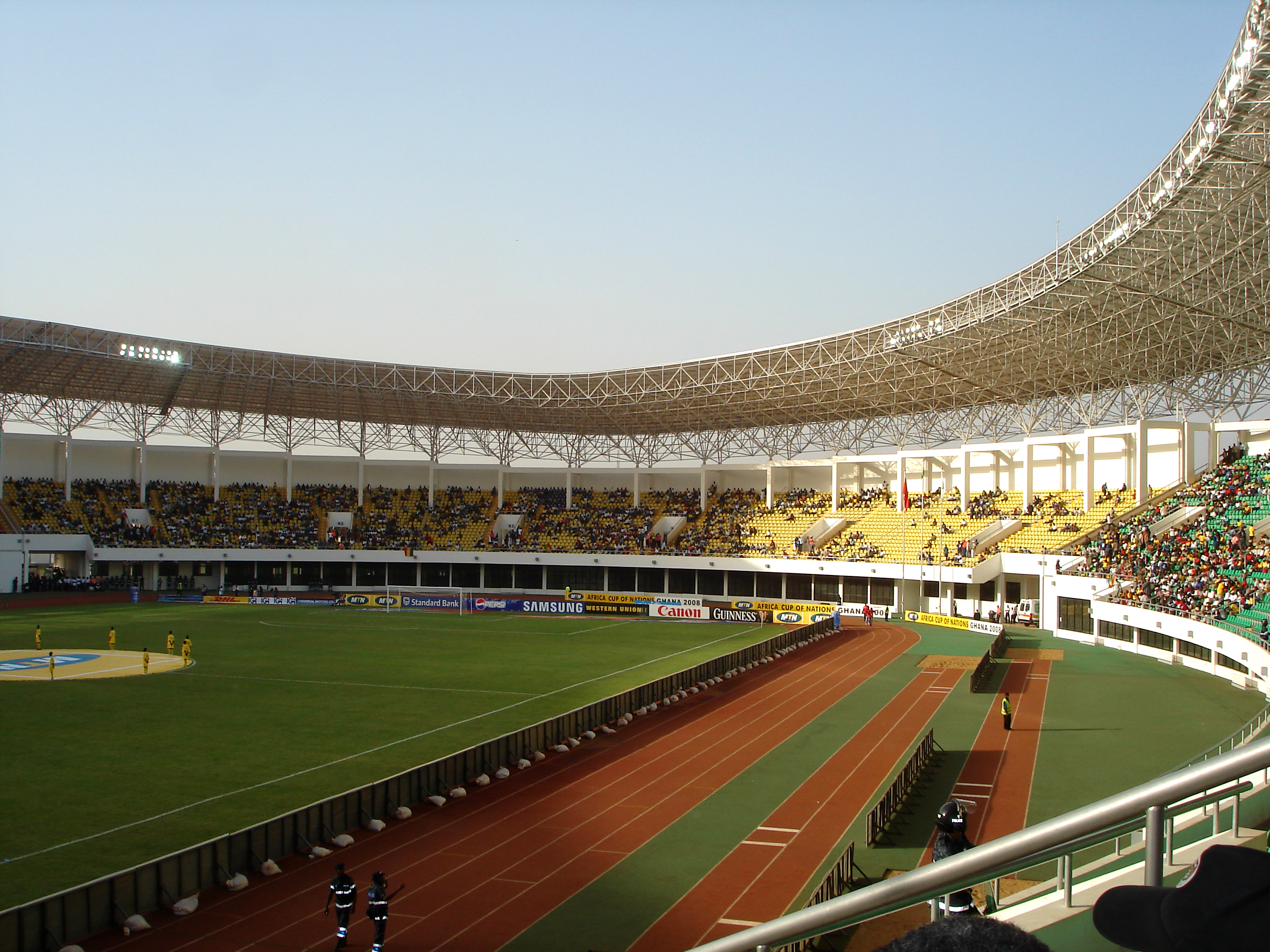
Tamale Stadium

Association football is the most popular sport in the country. The national men's football team is known as the Black Stars, with the under-20 team known as the Black Satellites. The under-17 team is known as the Black Starlets, while the national men's Olympic team is known as the Black Meteors. They have participated in many championships including the African Cup of Nations, the FIFA World Cup, and the FIFA U-20 World Cup.

On October 16, 2009, Ghana became the first African nation to win the FIFA U-20 World Cup by defeating Brazil 4–3 in a penalty shootout. On June 13, 2010, Ghana defeated Serbia 1–0 in first-round play in the 2010 FIFA World Cup becoming the first African team to win a FIFA World Cup game hosted on African soil and subsequently became the only African team to progress from the group stage to the knock out phase at the 2010 event. On June 26, 2010, Ghana defeated the US by 2 goals to 1 in their round of 16 matches, becoming the third African country to reach the quarter-final stage of the World Cup after Cameroon in 1990 and Senegal in 2002. A loss to Uruguay in Johannesburg on July 2, 2010, by a penalty shoot-out ended Ghana's attempt at reaching the semi-finals of the competition.

While men's football is the most widely followed sport in Ghana, the national women's football team is gaining exposure, participating in the FIFA Women's World Cup and the CAF Women's Championship. The Ghana women's national football team is known as the Black Queens, while the Ghana national women's under-20 football team is called the Black Princesses.

There are several club football teams in Ghana, which play in the Ghana Premier League and Division One league, both managed by the Ghana Football Association. Notable among these are Accra Hearts of Oak SC and Asante Kotoko, which play at the premier league level and are the dominant contenders in the tournament.

Prominent football players recognized at the international level include Tony Yeboah, Michael Essien, Kevin-Prince Boateng, Emmanuel Agyemang-Badu, Abedi Pele, Asamoah Gyan, Anthony Annan, Quincy Owusu-Abeyie, John Pantsil, Samuel Osei Kuffour, Richard Kingson, Sulley Muntari, Laryea Kingston, Stephen Appiah, André Ayew, John Mensah and Dominic Adiyiah.

Ghana is also the birthplace of World Wrestling Entertainment Wrestler Kofi Kingston (born Kofi Sarkodie-Mensah), who is wrestling on the Smackdown brand. Also is Kwame Nkrumah-Acheampong who competed in the Vancouver Winter Olympics. There have also been quite a few quality boxers produced such as Azumah Nelson a three-time world champion, Nana Yaw Konadu also a three-time world champion, Ike Quartey, as well as boxers Joshua Clottey and IBF bantamweight champion Joseph Agbeko.

== See also ==
- National Museum of Ghana
