= Susu box =

In Ghanaian culture, a susu box, or money box, is a small box made of wood or metal and sometimes clay with a small hole or slit created on top of the box for money to be dropped in. It is an equivalent to the piggy bank.
