= Environmental velocity =

In strategic management and organizational theory, environmental velocity is the rate and direction of change of the notional space in which organizations exist. This "space" consists of the political, technological, economic and competitive environment that influences an organization Organizations that can adjust and entrain their activities to suit their environmental velocity will have a competitive advantage over those organizations that can't.

== Decision making ==
Eisenhardt & Bourgeois (1988) proposed the concept of environmental velocity when studying strategic decision making in the micro-computer industry. They argued that this particular industry could be characterized as having a high-velocity environment, because it exhibited rapid and discontinuous change in demand, competition, technology and regulations. In a number of subsequent studies, it has been determined that success in high-velocity environments is related to fast, formal strategic decision-making processes and the use of heuristic reasoning processes.

== Innovation and organizational change ==
In line with contingency theory, an organization's environmental velocity dictates the rate at which high performing organizations should adapt. In a study that examined the link between product innovation and organizational change, Eisenhardt and Tabrizi (1995) show that rapid product development facilitates fast organizational change and thus gives firms the capability to keep pace with fast changing environments. Similarly, it has been found that the management of multiple-product innovation projects by firms induces improvisation and experimentation behaviors within these firms. These behaviors help firms to consistently succeed in high-velocity environments.

== Cognition ==
In the context of environmental velocity, research has examined the link between firm collective cognition and perceived environmental velocity. That is, how do the collective beliefs and associated practices of a firm shape how members of the firm perceive the velocity conditions of the environment? In a study of firms in the aircraft and semiconductor industries, it was found that environmental velocity is not simply an external and objective condition to which firms react; rather, firms collectively construct their environmental velocity through their social networks, collective assumptions, and environmental scanning approaches (Nadkarni and Narayanan, 2007). Furthermore, firms should employ adaptive scanning and sensemaking approaches to effectively understand and deal with the dynamism in high-velocity environments.

== Velocity regimes ==
In a key review of some of the major studies in this area, McCarthy et al. (2010) found that researchers and managers often focus on the rate or speed of change only, treating velocity as a single, latent aspect of the environment, characterized simply as being “high” or “low”. However, the original definition of environmental velocity (Eisenhardt and Bourgeois 1988) defines and describes it as a vector quality, composed of both rate and direction of change across multiple dimensions (e.g., regulations, demand, product, technology, and competition).

McCarthy et al. (2010) developed a framework that describes the relationships between these multiple velocity dimensions, noting that they may each have a distinct and often different velocity. They define “velocity homology” as the degree to which velocity dimensions have similar rates and directions of change and “velocity coupling” as the degree to which the velocities of different dimensions affect one another. This multidimensional treatment of environmental velocity results in four “velocity regimes” - simple, divergent, conflicted and integrated - based on the patterns of velocity homology and velocity coupling. A key implication of the framework is that firms should not necessarily focus on being uniformly fast (or slow) to suit industry conditions. Each of the four velocity regimes requires firms to maintain different forms of temporal fit (i.e., the entrainment of multiple organizational paces) and temporal coordination (i.e., managing the interdependences between organizational paces).

== Temporal orientations ==
McCarthy et al. (2010) explain that each of the velocity regimes they propose is suited to a different temporal orientation, which they define as “how individuals and teams conceive of time". Specially, they argue that when velocity dimensions are tightly coupled to each (i.e., “the relationship between the velocities of different dimensions involve significant immediate, direct causal effects”), an organization's capabilities would benefit from a polychronic orientation. In contrast, when velocity regimes are loosely coupled (i.e., “changes in the velocity of one dimension have relatively little immediate, direct impact on the velocities of other dimensions”) an organization's capabilities would benefit from a monochronic orientation.

== See also ==
- Innovation
