= Colored People's Time (disambiguation) =

Colored people's time is an American expression referring to a stereotype of African Americans as frequently being late.

Colored People's Time may also refer to:

- a 1960s public interest program by Detroit Public Television
- a 1980s play written by Leslie Lee which consisted of 13 vignettes of African American history
