= Awukudae Festival =

Festival in Ghana by the Ashantis

- Flag of Ashanti with the Golden stool symbol at the center
- Observed by: Ashantis of Ashanti
- Type: Ashanti festival
- Significance: Festival of ancestral rites
- Celebrations: Wednesday ceremony
- Date: Nine 40 days
- Frequency: 9 times per year

Awukudae Festival (meaning: "Wednesday ceremony") is a traditional Ashanti festival in Ashanti. Like the Akwasidae Festival, celebrated on a Sunday, Awukudae is part of the celebrations within the Adae Festival cycle. The festivals of Adae are not interchangeable, having been fixed from ancient times.

== Observance ==
The festival is observed on Wednesday, and its recurrence could be after 40 or 42 days. It is celebrated particularly in the Eastern Region. It is one of the two forms of Adae, the other being Akwasidae, which is celebrated the third Sunday after Awukudae. The observance is an ancestral rite by the chiefs and elders of the Akan clan around Kumasi. The Tuesday which falls 8 days before Awukudae is known as Kwabena; and the Saturday following Awukudae is known as "Memeneda Dapaa". The festival announcement is made by drummers the evening before on "Dapaa" day. After every eight Awukudae Festivals, the "Adae Butu" ritual marks the start of the Odwira festival.

== Traditions ==
Awukudae Festival is marked by Wo tu adae (announcing the day's celebration) drumming on the day preceding it and on Wednesday morning. Atumpan drums and single-air drums perform, but not Fontomfrom drums. In the forenoon, ceremonies are carried on in the Stool-House. The drumming symbolizes the seeking of protection for the guardian ancestral deities to the soul of the ruling king and it unifies the people under his reign. It is believed that Nsamanfoɔ and other ancestors are wandering around to see if this festival is being observed properly. On this occasion, it is also a practice to give donations for charitable causes such as feeding the hungry and helping the sick. On this day, Akanfoɔ consider travel as dangerous and hence remain at home, as it is an emotional day for them.

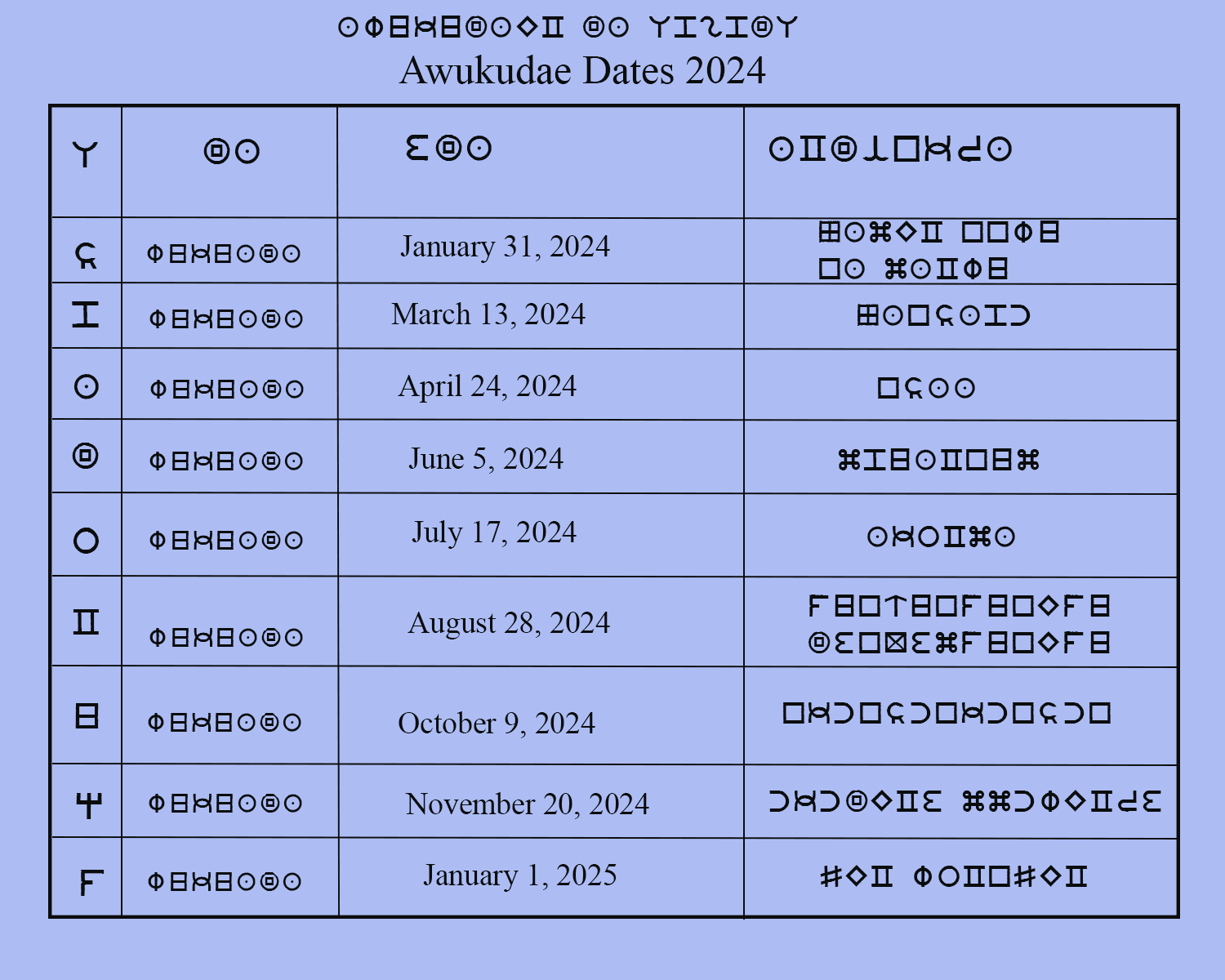
Awukudae Calendar for 2024

== See also ==
- Adae Festival
- Adae Kese Festival
- Ashanti Yam Festival
- Akwasidae Festival

== Bibliography ==
- Ayisi, Eric O. (1992). An Introduction to the Study of AfricanCulture. East African Publishers. p. 83. ISBN 978-9966-46617-4.
- Akua, Nana; Opokuwaa, Kyerewaa (2005). The Quest for Spiritual Transformation: Introduction to Traditional Akan Religion, Rituals And Practices. iUniverse. p. 93. ISBN 978-0-595-35071-1.
- Braffi, Emmanuel Kingsley (2002). Akwasidae and Odwira festivals. Mystic House. p. 10.
- Roy, Christian (2005). Traditional festivals. 2. M - Z. ABC-CLIO. pp. 26–. ISBN 978-1-57607-089-5.
