= Chronemics =

Study of the role of time in communication

Chronemics is an anthropological, philosophical, and linguistic subdiscipline that describes how time is perceived, coded, and communicated across a given culture. It is one of several subcategories to emerge from the study of nonverbal communication.

According to the Encyclopedia of Special Education, "Chronemics includes time orientation, understanding and organisation, the use of and reaction to time pressures, the innate and learned awareness of time, by physically wearing or not wearing a watch, arriving, starting, and ending late or on time." A person's perception and values placed on time plays a considerable role in their communication process.

The use of time can affect lifestyles, personal relationships, and professional life. Across cultures, people usually have different time perceptions, and this can result in tension or friction between individuals. Time perceptions include punctuality, interactions, and willingness to wait.

== Definition ==
Chronemics is the study of the use of time in nonverbal communication, though it carries implications for verbal communication as well. Time perceptions include punctuality, willingness to wait, and interactions. The use of time can affect lifestyles, daily agendas, speed of speech, movements, and how long people are willing to listen.

Fernando Poyatos, Professor Emeritus at the University of New Brunswick, coined the term chronemics in 1972. Thomas J. Bruneau (1940–2012), Professor Emeritus at Radford University who taught at the University of Guam in his early career and whose scholarship focused on silence, empathy, and intercultural communication, identified the parameters of this field of study in the late 1970s. Bruneau defined chronemics and specified the functions of time in human interactions as follows:

Chronemics can be briefly and generally defined as the study of human tempo as it related to human communication. More specifically, chronemics involves the study of both subjective and objective human tempos as they influence and are interdependent with human behavior. Further, chronemics involves the study of human communication as it relates to interdependent and integrated levels of time-experiencing. Previously, these interdependent and integrated levels have been outlined and discussed as: biological time; psychological time; social time; and cultural time. A number of classification systems exist in the literature of time. However, such systems are not applied to human interaction directly.

Time can be used as an indicator of status. For example, in most companies the boss can interrupt progress to hold an impromptu meeting in the middle of the work day, yet the average worker would have to make an appointment to see the boss. More realistically, is mutual respect as being disrespectful of another's time, regardless of hierarchy, quickly results in conflict.

The way in which different cultures perceive time can influence communication as well.

== Monochronic time ==
A monochronic time system means that things are done one at a time and time is segmented into small precise units. Under this system, time is scheduled, arranged, and managed.

The United States considers itself a monochronic society. This perception came about during the Industrial Revolution. Many Americans think of time as a precious resource not to be wasted or taken lightly. As communication scholar Edward T. Hall wrote regarding the American's viewpoint of time in the business world, "the schedule is sacred." Hall wrote that for monochronic cultures, such as the American culture, "time is tangible" and viewed as a commodity where "time is money" or "time is wasted." John Ivers, a professor of cultural paradigms, agrees with Edward Hall by stating, "In the market sense, monochronic people consume time." The result of this perspective is that monochronic cultures place a paramount value on schedules, tasks, and 'getting the job done'.

If, for example, a businessperson from the United States has a meeting scheduled, they may grow frustrated if they are required to wait an hour for their partner to arrive. This is an example of a monochronic-time-oriented individual running in to conflict with a polychronic-time-oriented individual. Though the United States is seen as one of the most monochronic countries, it has subcultures that may lean more to one side or the other of the monochronic–polychronic divide within the states themselves. Southern states can be similarly compared to northern ones. Ivers pointed this out by comparing waiters in restaurants in northern and southern states. Waiters from the north are "to the point": they will "engage in little" and there is usually "no small talk." They try to be as efficient as possible, while those in the south work towards "establishing a nice, friendly, micro-relationship" with the customer. They are still considerate of time, but it is not the most important goal in the south.

The culture of African Americans might also be seen as polychronic.

== Polychronic time ==
A polychronic time system means several things can be done at once. In polychronic time systems, a wider view of time is exhibited, and time is perceived in large fluid sections.

Per some authors, examples of polychronic cultures are Latin American, African, Arab, South Asian, Mediterranean, and Native American cultures, although others have described this categorization as exoticizing and misleading. Supposedly, these cultures' view on time can be connected to "natural rhythms, the earth, and the seasons". These analogies can be understood and compared because natural events can occur spontaneously and sporadically, like polychronic-time-oriented people and polychronic-time-oriented cultures. A scenario would be an Inuk working in a factory in Alaska where the superiors blow a whistle to alert for break times, etc. The Inuit are not fond of that method because they determine their times by the sea tides, how long it takes place and how long it lasts. In polychronic cultures, "time spent with others" is considered a "task" and of importance to one's daily regimen.

Cultures considered polychronic purportedly are much less focused on the preciseness of accounting for time and more on tradition and relationships rather than on tasks. Polychronic societies have no problem being late for an appointment if they are deeply focused on some work or in a meeting that ran past schedule, because the concept of time is fluid and can easily expand or contract as need be. As a result, polychronic cultures have a much less formal perception of time. They are not ruled by precise calendars and schedules.

=== Measuring polychronicity ===
Bluedorn, Allen C., Carol Felker Kaufman, and Paul M. Lane concluded that "developing an understanding of the monochronic/polychronic continuum will not only result in a better self-management but will also allow more rewarding job performances and relationships with people from different cultures and traditions." Researchers have examined that predicting someone's polychronicity plays an important role in productivity and individual well-being. Researchers have developed the following questionnaires to measure polychronicity:

- Inventory of Polychronic Values (IPV), developed by Bluedorn et al., which is a 10-item scale designed to assess "the extent to which people in a culture prefer to be engaged in two or more tasks or events simultaneously and believe their preference is the best way to do things."
- Polychronic Attitude Index (PAI), developed by Kaufman-Scarborough & Lindquist in 1991, which is a 4-item scale measuring individual preference for polychronicity, in the following statements:
1. "I do not like to juggle several activities at the same time".
2. "People should not try to do many things at once".
3. "When I sit down at my desk, I work on one project at a time".
4. "I am comfortable doing several things at the same time".

== Predictable patterns between cultures with differing time systems ==
Predictable patterns between cultures with differing time systems
Monochronic people	Polychronic people
Do one thing at a time	Do many things at once
Concentrate on a task set before them	Concentrate on an event happening around them
Consider time commitments (deadlines, schedules) seriously	Consider objectives (goals, results) seriously
Are low-context and need information	Are high-context and already have information
Are committed to the job and end results	Are committed to people and relationships
Dedicate themselves to plans	Change plans often and easily
Are more concerned with privacy and individual ownership	Are more concerned with community and shared connections
Emphasize prompt time recognition, regardless of relationship or circumstances	Emphasize response based on nature of relationship and circumstances
Have strong tendency to build temporary, practical relationships	Have strong tendency to build lifetime, familial relationships

=== Cross-cultural perspectives on time ===
Conflicting attitudes between the monochronic and polychronic perceptions of time can interfere with cross-cultural relations and play a role in these domains, and as a result, challenges can occur within an otherwise assimilated culture. One example in the United States is the Hawaiian culture, which employs two time systems: Haole time and Hawaiian time.

When you hear someone say, 'See you at two o'clock haole time,' they mean they will do just that. Haole time is when the person will meet when they say they will meet. But if you were to hear someone say, 'I'll be there at two o'clock Hawaiian time,' then something different is implied. Hawaiian time is very lax and it basically means 'when you get there.' —Nick Lewis

According to Ashley Fulmer and Brandon Crosby, "as intercultural interactions increasingly become the norm rather than the exception, the ability of individuals, groups, and organizations to manage time effectively in cross-cultural settings is critical to the success of these interactions".

== Time orientations ==
The way an individual perceives time and the role time plays in their lives is a learned perspective. As discussed by Alexander Gonzalez and Phillip Zimbardo, "every child learns a time perspective that is appropriate to the values and needs of his society" (Guerrero, DeVito & Hecht, 1999, p. 227).

There are four basic psychological time orientations:

1. Past
2. Time-line
3. Present
4. Future

Each orientation affects the structure, content, and urgency of communication (Burgoon, 1989). The past orientation has a hard time developing the notion of elapsed time and these individuals often confuse present and past happenings as all in the same. People oriented with time-line cognitivity are often detail oriented and think of everything in linear terms. These individuals also often have difficulty with comprehending multiple events at the same time. Individuals with a present orientation are mostly characterized as pleasure seekers who live for the moment and have a very low risk aversion. Those individuals who operate with future orientation are often thought of as being highly goal oriented and focused on the broad picture.

The use of time as a communicative channel can be a powerful, yet subtle, force in face-to-face interactions. Some of the more recognizable types of interaction that use time are:

Regulating interaction
This is shown to aid in the orderly transition of conversational turn-taking. When the speaker is opening the floor for a response, they will pause. However, when no response is desired, the speaker will talk a faster pace with minimal pause. (Capella, 1985)
Expressing intimacy
As relationships become more intimate, certain changes are made to accommodate the new relationship status. Some of the changes that are made include lengthening the time spent on mutual gazes, increasing the amount of time doing tasks for or with the other person and planning for the future by making plans to spend more time together (Patterson, 1990).
Affect management
The onset of powerful emotions can cause a stronger affect, ranging from joy to sorrow or even to embarrassment. Some of the behaviors associated with negative affects include decreased time of gaze and awkwardly long pauses during conversations. When this happens, it is common for the individuals to try and decrease any negative affects and subsequently strengthen positive affects (Edelman & Iwawaki, 1987).
Evoking emotion
Time can be used to evoke emotions in an interpersonal relationship by communicating the value of the relationship. For example, when someone with whom one has a close relationship is late, one may not take it personally, especially if that is characteristic of them. However, when meeting with a total stranger, disrespect for the value of one's time may be taken personally and could even cause one to display negative emotions if and when they do arrive for the meeting.
Facilitating service and task goals
Professional settings can sometimes give rise to interpersonal relations which are quite different from other "normal" interactions. For example, the societal norms that dictate minimal touch between strangers are clearly altered if one member of the dyad is a doctor, and the environment is that of a hospital examination room.

=== Time orientation and consumers ===
Time orientation has also revealed insights into how people react to advertising. Martin, Gnoth and Strong (2009) found that future-oriented consumers react most favorably to ads that feature a product to be released in the distant future and that highlight primary product attributes. In contrast, present-oriented consumers prefer near-future ads that highlight secondary product attributes. Consumer attitudes were mediated by the perceived usefulness of the attribute information.

== Culture and diplomacy ==
=== Cultural roots ===
Just as monochronic and polychronic cultures have different time perspectives, understanding the time orientation of a culture is critical to becoming better able to successfully handle diplomatic situations. Americans think they have a future orientation. Hall indicates that for Americans "tomorrow is more important" and that they "are oriented almost entirely toward the future" (Cohen, 2004, p. 35). The future-focused orientation attributes to at least some of the concerns that Americans have with "addressing immediate issues and moving on to new challenges" (Cohen, 2004, p. 35).

On the other hand, many polychronic cultures have a past-orientation toward time.

These time perspectives are the seeds for communication clashes in diplomatic situations. Trade negotiators have observed that "American negotiators are generally more anxious for agreement because "they are always in a hurry" and basically "problem solving oriented." In other words, they place a high value on resolving an issue quickly calling to mind the American catchphrase "some solution is better than no solution" (Cohen, 2004, p. 114). Similar observations have been made of Japanese-American relations. Noting the difference in time perceptions between the two countries, former ambassador to Tokyo, Mike Mansfield commented "We're too fast, they're too slow" (Cohen, 2004, p. 118).

=== Influence on global affairs ===
Different perceptions of time across cultures can influence global communication. When writing about time perspective, Gonzalez and Zimbardo comment that "There is no more powerful, pervasive influence on how individuals think and cultures interact than our different perspectives on time—the way we learn how we mentally partition time into past, present and future."

The monochronic-oriented approach to negotiations is direct, linear and rooted in the characteristics that illustrate low context tendencies. The low context culture approaches diplomacy in a lawyerly, dispassionate fashion with a clear idea of acceptable outcomes and a plan for reaching them. Draft arguments would be prepared elaborating positions. A monochronic culture, more concerned with time, deadlines and schedules, tends to grow impatient and want to rush to "close the deal."

More polychronic-oriented cultures come to diplomatic situations with no particular importance placed on time. Chronemics is one of the channels of nonverbal communication preferred by a High context Polychronic negotiator over verbal communication. The polychronic approach to negotiations will emphasize building trust between participants, forming coalitions and finding consensus. High context Polychronic negotiators might be charged with emotion toward a subject thereby obscuring an otherwise obvious solution.

== Control of time in interpersonal relationships ==
=== Waiting time ===
Researchers Insel and Lindgren write that the act of making an individual of a lower stature wait is a sign of dominance. They note that one who "is in the position to cause another to wait has power over him. To be kept waiting is to imply that one's time is less valuable than that of the one who imposes the wait."

=== Talk time ===
There is a direct correlation between the status of an individual in an organization and conversation. This includes both length of conversation, turn-taking, and who initiates and ends a conversation. Extensive research indicates that those with more status in an organization will speak more often and for a greater length of time. Meetings between superiors and subordinates provide an opportunity to illustrate this concept. A superior – regardless of whether or not they are running the actual meeting – lead discussions, ask questions, and have the ability to speak for longer periods of time without interruption. Likewise, research shows that turn-taking is also influenced by power. Social psychologist Nancy Henley notes that "Subordinates are expected to yield to superiors and there is a cultural expectation that a subordinate will not interrupt a superior". The length of a response follows the same pattern. While the superior can speak for as long as they want, the responses of the subordinate are shorter in length. Albert Mehrabian noted that deviation from this pattern led to negative perceptions of the subordinate by the superior. Beginning and ending a communication interaction in the workplace is also controlled by the higher-status individual in an organization. The time and duration of the conversation are dictated by the higher-status individual.

=== Work time ===
The time of high status individuals is perceived as valuable, and they control their own time. On the other hand, a subordinate with less status has their time controlled by a higher status individual and are in less control of their time – making them likely to report their time to a higher authority. Such practices are more associated with those in non-supervisory roles or in blue collar rather than white collar professions. Instead, as one's status in an organization increase, the flexibility of the work schedule also increases. For instance, while administrative professionals might keep a 9 to 5 work schedule, their superiors may keep less structured hours. This does not mean that the superior works less. They may work longer, but the structure of their work environment is not strictly dictated by the traditional workday. Instead, as Koehler and their associates note "individuals who spend more time, especially spare time, to meetings, to committees, and to developing contacts, are more likely to be influential decision makers".

A specific example of the way power is expressed through work time is scheduling. As Yakura and others have noted in research shared by Ballard and Seibold, "scheduling reflects the extent to which the sequencing and duration of plans activities and events are formalized" (Ballard and Seibold, p. 6).

== Associated theories ==
=== Expectancy violations theory ===
Developed by Judee Burgoon, expectancy violations theory (EVT) sees communication as the exchange of information which is high in relational content and can be used to violate the expectations of another which will be perceived as either positively or negatively depending on the liking between the two people.

When our expectations are violated, we will respond in specific ways. If an act is unexpected and is assigned favorable interpretation, and it is evaluated positively, it will produce more favorable outcomes than an expected act with the same interpretation and evaluation.

=== Interpersonal adaptation theory ===
The interpersonal adaptation theory (IAT), founded by Judee Burgoon, states that adaptation in interaction is responsive to the needs, expectations, and desires of communicators and affects how communicators position themselves in relation to one another and adapt to one another's communication. For example, they may match each other's behavior, synchronize the timing of behavior, or behave in dissimilar ways. It is also important to note that individuals bring to interactions certain requirements that reflect basic human needs, expectations about behavior based on social norms, and desires for interaction based on goals and personal preferences (Burgoon, Stern & Dillman, 1995).

== See also ==
- African time
- Paul Virilio
- Philosophy of space and time
- Proper time
- Johannes Fabian
