= Bragoro =

Rite by the Akans in Ghana

Bragoro, also known as Brapue, is a puberty rite performed by the Akans especially among the Asante people.

Traditionally, when a young girl experiences her first menstruation (menarche) she undergoes the rite called Bragoro. It is believed that this ushers her into womanhood.

Soon after a young girl experiences her first menstruation, her mother reports it to the council of elders, queenmothers and community leaders to signal to them that her daughter is now ready and qualifies to be initiated.

Though Bragoro, is culturally significant, it is declining in frequency.
