= Proper time (philosophy) =

Proper time is a concept used in sociology, biology, psychology, planning, legal theory, and philosophy to describe discrete time, inherent time, or duration, given that no comprehensive, unified theory of time exists to date.

Helga Nowotny, in 1989, had published Eigenzeit (German for proper time), borrowing, as A. R. Hochschild put it, an expression used in relativity theory. In the meantime, medial eigenzeit has become "further technology-based and created by data," as Nowotny wrote in 2017. Kurt Flasch had referenced Eigenzeit in his 1993 book Was ist Zeit? Augustinus von Hippo. Das XI. Buch der Confessiones. Text—Übersetzung—Kommentar.

In 2013, the German Research Foundation started its priority program (Schwerpunktprogramm) called Ästhetische Eigenzeiten (aesthetic proper times), referencing differences between monochronic and polychronic cultures, and resulting in multiple German books on the topic.

Natural processes like growth and change require discrete amounts of time, and this also applies to human learning: phases of learning allow time frames of cognizing, playing, being creative, and applying learned knowledge. In nature, these developments happen rhythmically and cyclically more often than along linear models of time. Many developmental processes are counterbalanced by other regulatory processes; for example, periods of growth and flowering are counterbalanced by phases of decline and death. Periods of growth are followed by phases of regeneration or reproduction. Genetically determined sensitive phases in living organisms are generally those which enable development in the first place.

Human striving to satisfy one's needs is a central tenet of Gestalt therapy: The emergence of a need through to its satisfaction forms a Gestalt. Therapy, therefore, focuses on keeping these processes flowing, in keeping with the motto “Don't push the river.” Joseph Zinker provides an intuitive illustration of the contact cycle and possible disorders—needs become the focus of attention, energy is mobilized, active behavior ensues, and, once fulfilled through contact with the self and the environment, these needs recede into the background.

Personal proper time can and does conflict with economic interests and the belief in progress, where maximum increases in productivity and the associated speed are desired. In turbo-capitalism, a largely linear model of time is based on exponential growth, and—in the worst-case—established structures and the rhythm of the financial markets and industrial production ignore personal time. Time management can then be misdirected as a mere means of increasing efficiency and consequently lead to burnout or depression. Multitasking, too, reaches its limits here. Time researchers therefore call for a deceleration of today's society.

== See also ==
- Chronemics
- Comparative literature
- Conscious breathing
- Dialectic of the Enlightenment
- Information Age
- Philosophy of social science
- Self-care in philosophy
- Sociology of science and technology
- Subjective vitality
- Temporality
- Time affluence
- Time perception
- Time-use research
- Zeitgeist

== Literatur ==
- Dobson, M., & Parker, G. (2025): The temporal governance of planning in England: Planning reform, Uchronia and ‘proper time’. Planning Theory, 24(1), 21–42.
- Gamper, M., Hühn, H., Richter. S. (eds.): Formen der Zeit. Ein Wörterbuch der ästhetischen Eigenzeiten, Hannover: Wehrhahn 2020.
- Francot, Lyana: Sociology of legal temporalities, in: Research Handbook on the Sociology of Law, ed. Jiří Přibáň. Edward Elgar Publishing 2020, 190–202.
- Nowotny, Helga: Time—The Modern and Postmodern Experience. Cambridge, MA: Polity Press 1994.
- Nowotny, Helga: Eigenzeit. Revisited, translated by Otmar Binder, in: Hartmann, M., Prommer, E., Deckner, K., Görland, S. (eds.): Mediated Time: Perspectives on Time in a Digital Age. Springer 2019, 67–85.
- Opitz, Florian: Speed—Auf der Suche nach der verlorenen Zeit. 2012. ISBN 978-3-442-15771-6.
