= Tardiness =

Habit of being late or delaying arrival

Tardiness is the habit of being late or delaying arrival. Being late as a form of misconduct may be formally punishable in various arrangements, such as workplace, school, etc. An opposite personality trait is punctuality.

== Workplace tardiness ==
=== United States ===
Workplace tardiness is one attendance issue, along with the absence from work and failure to properly notify about absence or being late.

To be at work on time is an implied obligation unless stated otherwise. It is a legal reason for discharge in cases when it is a demonstrable disregard of duty: repeated tardiness without compelling reasons, tardiness associated with other misconduct, and single inexcusable tardiness resulted in grave loss of employer's interests.

If tardiness is minor or without interference with employer's operations, it is not to be legally considered as misconduct.

== Characteristics of tardy people ==
Diana DeLonzor in her book Never Be Late Again: 7 Cures for the Punctually Challenged classified habitually tardy people into seven categories:

- a "rationalizer" insists on blaming the circumstances instead of acknowledging responsibility for tardiness.
- a "producer" tries to do as much as possible in time available and as a result has difficulties with too tight schedules.
- a "deadliner" enjoys the adrenaline rush during the attempts to beat the time target.
- an "indulger" has little self-control.
- for a "rebel" running late is defying the authority and the rules.
- an "absent-minded professor".
- an "evader" puts a higher priority to their own needs compared to being on time.

Many people who struggle with tardiness might have ADHD, OCD, or another condition that forces them into tardiness.

== Ethnic stereotypes ==
There are several stereotypes that attribute tardiness to certain cultures. African time is the perceived cultural tendency toward a more relaxed attitude to time among Africans both in Africa and abroad. It is generally used in a pejorative and racist sense about tardiness in appointments, meetings, and events.

CP Time (from "Colored People's Time") is a dated American expression similarly referring to a stereotype of African Americans as frequently being late.

"Fiji Time" is a local saying in Fiji to refer to the habit of tardiness and the slow pace on the island, and the term is widely used by tourist focused businesses both in advertising and products and souvenirs.

"Filipino Time" refers to the perceived habitual tardiness of Filipinos. It bears similarities with "African Time" and "CP Time" and the term is usually used in a pejorative sense as one of the defining negative traits of the Filipino. Filipino theologian José M. De Mesa pointed out that the widespread acceptance of "Filipino Time" as one of the traits that defines the Filipino is an example of successful internalization of the negative image of Filipinos as perceived by the Spanish and American colonizers. He argued that the persistence of this colonial self-image among Filipinos contributed to the weakening of their corporate cultural self and to the undermining of their growth, as it compelled many Filipinos to reject themselves and to be ashamed of their identity. He also noted that a local theologian was surprised to discover that many of the writings concerning Filipino self-identity mostly focused on the negative and disparaging traits such as "Filipino time", which is an evidence of the seeming penchant of Filipinos for self-flagellation. Some sources identify the origins of the Filipino's lack of punctuality to the Spanish colonial period, as arriving late was considered to be a sign of status back then, as depicted in a scene in Chapter 22 of José Rizal's novel El Filibusterismo. An alternative interpretation of "Filipino time" sets aside its negative connotations by considering the very concept as an example case of the unsuccessful attempt at imposing Western cultural standards (such as the notion of "time") on Filipino and other non-Western cultures and thus as a successful tool of national resistance. In some cases, however, this tardiness can be deliberately used as a form of showcasing power. The 1976 National Artist of the Philippines for Literature Nick Joaquin challenged the narrative of Spanish colonial roots of "Filipino time", instead identifying its origins in the pre-colonial culture of timelessness before the introduction of the "foreign tyrant clock" during the Spanish era, and thus to the local resistance against the transition from the pre-colonial clockless society to the foreign-imposed clock-based culture.

Another related term is the "mañana habit" (Filipino: kaugaliang mañana; sometimes informally called as mamaya na) which denotes procrastination of Filipinos to do work or an activity mamaya na (later).

Mañana attitude: The lax attitude to time is also attributed to South America and the procrastination is described by the euphemism "Mañana!", which literally means "tomorrow", but, as a joke goes, it is "anytime between tomorrow and never". In March 2007 the government of Peru announced the campaign, "La Hora sin Demora," or "Time without Delay" to combat the lateness habit known in the country as "hora peruana," or "Peruvian time". The habit of being late of former President of Peru Alejandro Toledo was known as "Cabana time", after his place of birth. A term was coined, "Mañanaland", and used in several titles, e.g., Mañanaland (2020) by Pam Muñoz Ryan, The Gringo in Mañanaland (1995) by DeeDee Halleck, Mañanaland; adventuring with camera and rifle through California in Mexico (1928) by John Cudahy, A Gringo in Mañana-Land (1924) by Harry L. Foster, or Stories from Mañana Land (1922) by May Carr Hanley.

Other terms referring to a loose attitude to time include "Hawaiian time" and "island time", as well as "Desi Standard Time" and "NDN time".

== See also ==
- Absenteeism
- Procrastination
- Time management
- Tardiness (scheduling)
