= Subjective vitality =

Feeling of aliveness

Subjective vitality refers to a positive feeling of aliveness and energy. It is often used instead of measures of subjective well-being in studies of eudaimonia and psychological well-being. It is also a better predictor of physical health when assessed by a doctor than subjective well-being.

== See also ==
- Aristotle
- Eudaimonia
- Flourishing
- Happiness
- Positive psychology
- Proper time (philosophy)
- Subjective well-being
