= Adae Festival =

Festival in Ghana by the Ashantis

- Flag of Ashanti with the Golden stool symbol at the center
- Observed by: Ashantis in Ashanti
- Type: Ancestral worship
- Date: Repeated nine times per year
- Frequency: Twice within 42 days (on a Sunday, Akwasidae, and on a Wednesday, Awukudae)

Adae Festival (Twi: "resting place") is a celebration in Ashanti. Considered a day of rest, it is the most important ancestral custom of the Ashanti people.

== Observance ==
Within a six-week cycle, Adae has two celebration days, once on a Sunday (Akwasidae) and again on a Wednesday (Awukudae). The Adae cycle is repeated nine times in a year. In observance of the Akan calendar, the ninth Adae Festival, called the Adae Kese Festival ("big Adae"), coincides with celebration of the New Year. It is therefore celebrated to thank the gods and the ancestors for the new harvest. The festivals within Adae are not interchangeable, having been fixed from ancient times.

== Traditions ==
The preparations for the Adae are quite elaborate. The day the preparations are made is called Dapaa,(Normally on Tuesdays and Sundays) . On this day, houses and the area surrounding them are all cleaned. In front of the chief's house, drums are played by the “divine drummer” (after paying due respects to the chief), the whole evening from sunset till late night along with ceremonial songs. The chief takes a meal consisting of yam or plantain. (without salt as it is the belief that spirits do not like it). With his processional party, he then proceeds to the chamber where the ceremonial stool (throne) is kept. The food that is left out after the chief has eaten is brought to the courtyard and sprinkled about for the dead spirits of ancestors to eat it; this is accompanied by the ringing of a bell indicative of the spirits eating the food. The ritual continues with the sacrifice of sheep by the chief's attendants. The blood of these sacrifices are marked on the forehead and chest of the chief. The queen mother then offers a paste of fufu (made of cassava or yam). Then rum is poured over the stool, and what is left is consumed by those present at the chamber. All those present at the site greet the chief, who is ceremonially seated at the open courtyard with the greetings "Adae morn". Other ceremonial features include the court poet reciting poems which extol the deeds of the past chiefs, and drums are continuously beaten to the accompaniment of horns. The celebration runs until late at night. The food and drink offerings to the stool are removed late in the evening, except for the flesh which is allowed to remain there for more time.

== See also ==
- Adae Kese Festival
- Akwasidae Festival
- Ashanti Yam Festival
- Awukudae Festival

== Bibliography ==
- Braffi, Emmanuel Kingsley (2002). Akwasidae and Odwira festivals. Mystic House. p. 10.
- Roy, Christian . (2005). Religion Traditional festivals. 2. M – Z. ABC-CLIO. p. 2. ISBN 9781576070895.
