= Adae Kese Festival =

Celebration by the Ashantis of Ghana

Adae Kese Festival ("big resting place") is an important albeit rare celebration among the Ashantis in Ghana. There are two main periods for this celebration: one is Awukudae, and the other is Akwasidae. It glorifies the achievements of the Asante kingdom. It was first celebrated to the achievement of statehood of the people, after the war that the Ashantis had their independence, in the Battle of Feyiase which they fought against the people of Denkyira. It is also the occasion when the purification ceremony of Odwira is performed at the burial shrines of ancestral spirits. Generally, this coincides with the harvest season of yam and hence the ritual was also called the "Yam custom" by Europeans. It is celebrated every two weeks by the people in accordance with the calendar of the Akans based on the cycle of forty-two days and nine months in their calendar. The festival is mostly held to climax celebrations of specific achievements and milestones of the people of the Ashanti kingdom. The festival is a day of rest so it is forbidden to work on that day.

== Observance ==
It is the annual culmination festival of the Akan calendar, the ninth Adae Festival (which occurs every six weeks). Adae Kese ushers in the New Year, with dates ranging between July and October, though some Akans like the Akim, Akwamu, and Ashanti celebrate New Year in January. It is also celebrated at the Manhyia Palace. It comprises rituals which is aimed purifying the spirit of the King's palace chambers by members of the royal family and other dignitaries.

== History ==
The custom of holding this festival came into prominence between 1697 and 1699 when statehood was achieved for the people of Ashante after the war of independence, the Battle of Feyiase, against the Denkyira. The festival was observed subsequently to the establishment of the Golden Stool (throne) in 1700.It is celebrated to mark milestones in the history of the Ashante Kingdom. The festival was a time to consecrate the remains of the dead kings; those remains had been kept in a mausoleum at the sacred burial ground of Bantama, a royal suburb of Kumasi. Adae Kese brought a link and a level of faith and solidarity between the living and the ancestral spirits. In its early times, this festival also had implications of sacrifice, both human and animal. The main festival used to be held first at Hemmaa, close to the king's palace near the location of the ancestral shrine of the kings. The second and more important part of the festival was performed at Bantama, which also was the last burial ground of the Asante kings, and was known as the “notorious Bantama ritual" as the sacrifices involved were of large proportions. When the festival was announced, by beating of drums, people went into hiding for fear that they may be selected for the human sacrifice. As part of the ritual, sheep sacrifice was also involved. Whether human sacrifice was involved or not is a subject of debate, but the fact is that the African societies considered these rites as a "reunion between the living and the dead."

== Traditions ==
The Adae Kese Festival follows the same rituals as the Adae Festival, however, a difference in the celebration rites is that the chief carries a sheep for sacrifice to the Stool. The purification ceremony of Odwira is celebrated during Adae Kese at the burial shrines of ancestral spirits. Generally, this coincides with the harvest season of yam, and hence the ritual was also called the Yam custom by Europeans. It is celebrated at this season to thank the gods and the ancestors for a good harvest. The season is equally used to outdoor the new yam.

Every five years, the Adae Kese Festival is hosted by the paramount ruler of the Asante in the capital city of Kumasi, Asanteman, and lasts for two weeks. As a formal state celebration, it involves several villages and towns, within a traditional area known as Odwira, uniting Ashanti from all walks of life (Odwira means to purify), who attends and embrace the festival. Asantehene, the titular ruler of Kumasi, holds a colourful durbar of chiefs and their queens on this occasion when they all turn up in full regalia. Dancing to the beats of drums is part of the pageantry. The festival is also the occasion when people pledge their confidence in the present king of the Ashante. Some of the deserving people are given awards of recognition on this occasion. The king also holds a very private celebration within his palace chambers along with the designated members of the royal family and other officials.

== Commentary on the Talking Drum ==
Among other activities that take place on the day of the festival, the chief is carried through the streets of Kumasi in procession. The following version of the drum recitation was written by Robert Sutherland Rattray in 1923:

"Oh, Divine Drummer,
I am scarcely awake and have risen up.
I, the Ashanti porcupine chief's drummer,
I am scarcely awake.
I have made myself to rise up,
I am about to sound the drum,
If you have gone elsewhere and I call you,
Come;
The fowl has crowed in the morning,
The fowl has awakened and crowed,
Very early,
They are addressing me and I shall understand.

There are swamps, swamps, swamps,
Which can swallow up the elephant.
A river may lie small in the valley
Between great hills.
But it flows on for ever and ever.
If you have gone elsewhere and I call upon you ( the spirit of the elephant)

Come.
The fowl has crowed in the morning,
The fowl has awakened and crowed,
Very early,
They are addressing me and I shall understand.

I lay down, but I did not feel sleepy,
I lay down but my eyes did not close,
For three watches of the night.
I think about my friends who have left me and are asleep,
Amoafo-Awuku-The cock-the-the old bird whose bones have grown strong.
Fowl, good morning, good morning.
The fowl has crowed in the morning,
The fowl has awakened and crowed,
Very early,
They are addressing me and I shall understand.

The sky is wide, wide, wide,
The earth is wide, wide, wide,
The one was lifted up,
The other was set down,
In ancient times, long, long ago.

Supreme Sky God, upon whom men lean and fall not,
We serve you.
When the Sky God shows you anything
May you profit by it.
If we wish 'white' we get it,
If we wish 'red' we get it.
Him upon whom we lean and do not fall,
God, good morning.
You whom we serve upon a Saturday,
Good morning,
The fowl has crowed in the morning,
The fowl has awakened and crowed,
Very early,
They are addressing me and I shall understand.

The stream crosses the path,
The oath crosses the stream;
Which of them is the elder?
Did we not cut a path to go and meet this stream?
The stream had its origin long, long ago,
The stream had its origin in the Creator.
He created things,
Pure, pure Tano (refers to the Ashantis principal god)
Come here, Tano;
He devours rams,
Ta, the great one, the powerful one
Whom we serve upon a Monday.

He is coming, he is coming,
Little by little, slowly, slowly,
Be careful not to stumble,
Little by little, slowly, slowly.
You will come and sit down,
Chief, you will come and sit down.
Kon! Kon! Kon!
The great man, Osai's son, has sat down.
The King has sat down
He who destroys towns has sat down,
He who never forgives,
He has taken a stool and sat down."

== See also ==
- Adae Festival
- Akwasidae Festival
- Ashanti Yam Festival
- Awukudae Festival

== Bibliography ==
- Agorsah, E. Kofi (2010). Religion, Ritual and African Tradition: AfricanFoundations. AuthorHouse. pp. 42–43. ISBN 9781449005528.
- Roy, Christian (2005). Religion Traditional festivals. 2. M – Z. ABC-CLIO. p. 2. ISBN 9781576070895.
