= Asante people =

Ethnic group and nation in Ghana

Asante
Asantefoɔ
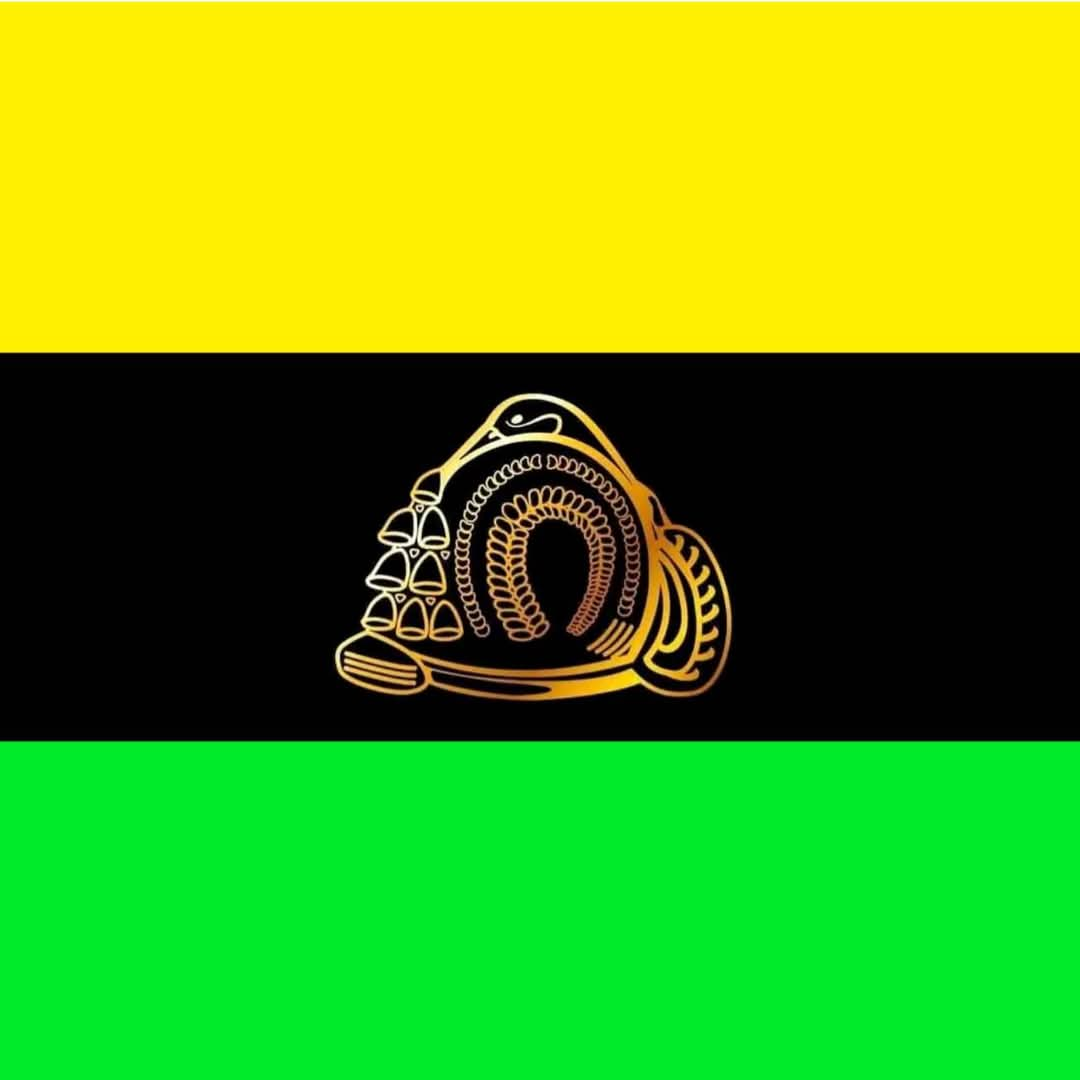
- Asante Frankaa

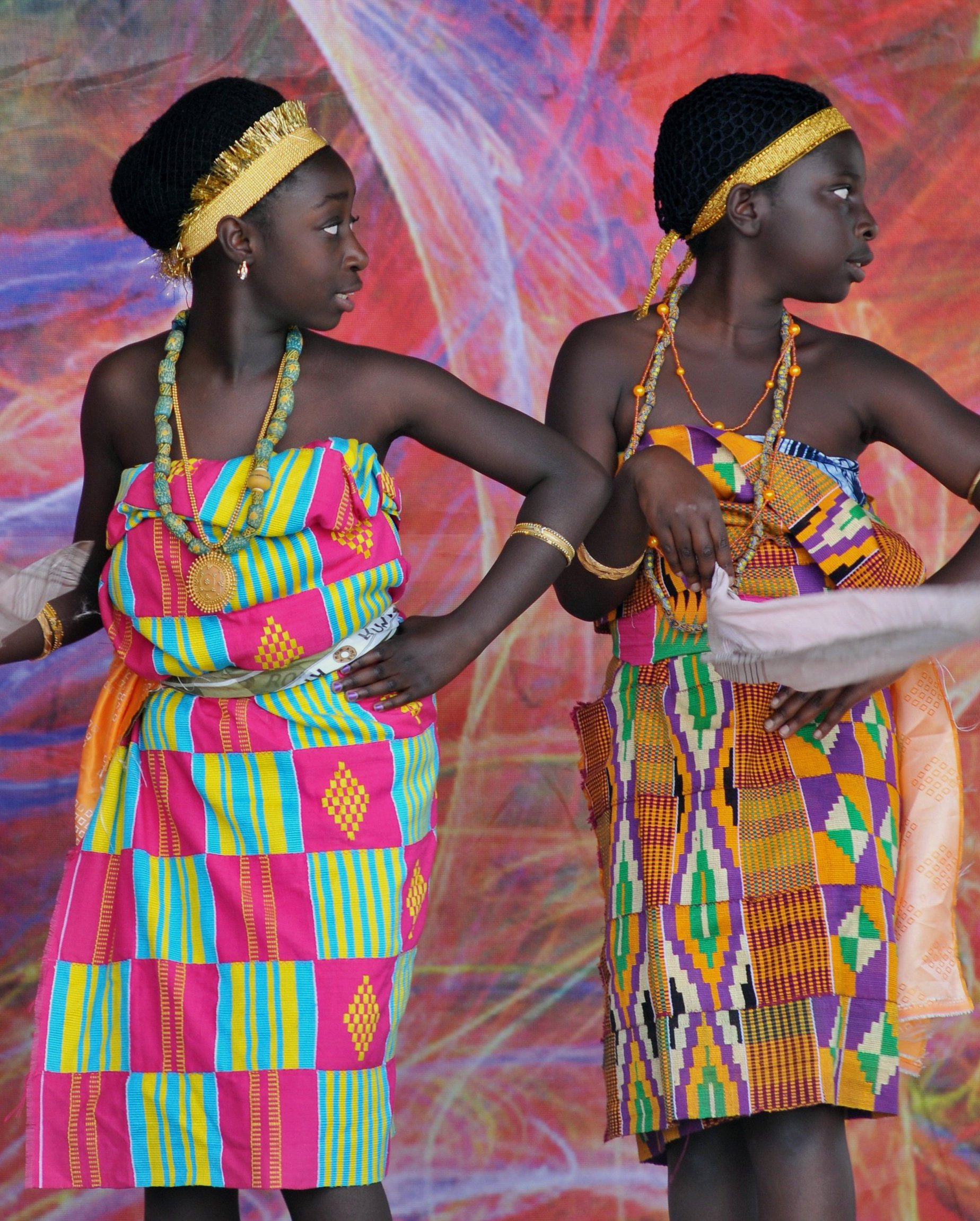
- Akan dancers in Ghana

Total population
- 6,215,000

Regions with significant populations
- Ashanti Region Ahafo Region Bono Region Bono East Region Oti Region (Ghana)
- Ghana: 5,550,000
- Ivory Coast: 450,000
- Togo: 96,000
- Liberia: 64,000
- United Kingdom: 28,000
- Canada: 27,000

Languages
- Twi (a native dialect of Akan); English

Religion
- Christianity; Islam; Akan religion

Related ethnic groups
- Akan (Nzema, Akuapem, Akwamu, Akyem, Bono, Coromantee, Fante, Kwahu, Wassa, Sefwi)

- People: Asantefoɔ
- Language: Asante Twi
- Country: Asanteman

The Asante, also known as Ashanti in English (/əˈʃɑːntiː/), are part of the Akan ethnic group and are native to the Ashanti Region of modern-day Ghana. Asantes are the last group to emerge out of the various Akan civilisations. Twi is spoken by over nine million Asante people as their native language.

The Asante people developed the Ashanti Empire along the Lake Volta and Gulf of Guinea. The empire was founded in 1670, and the capital Kumase was founded in 1680 by Asantehene Osei Kofi Tutu I on the advice of Okomfo Anokye, his premier. Sited at the crossroads of the Trans-Saharan trade, Kumase's strategic location contributed significantly to its growth. Over time a number of peculiar factors combined to transform the Kumase metropolis into a financial centre and political capital. The main causal factors included the unquestioning loyalty to the Asante rulers and the Kumase metropolis' growing wealth, derived in part from the capital's lucrative domestic trade in items such as slaves and gold bullion.

== Nomenclature ==
In the Asante dialect of Twi, Asantefo; singular masculine: Asantenibarima, singular feminine: Asantenibaa. The name Asante "warlike" is thought to have originated between 1670 and 1701, when the former Asante tributary state became a centralized kingdom.

== Geography ==
The Ashanti Region has a variety of terrains: coasts and mountains; wildlife sanctuary, strict nature reserve, and national park; forests and grasslands; lush agricultural areas; and nearby savannas, enriched with vast deposits of industrial minerals, most notably vast deposits of gold.

The territory the Asante people is home to a volcanic crater lake, Lake Bosumtwi, and Asante is bordered westerly to Lake Volta within the central part of present-day Ghana. The Asante territory is densely forested, mostly fertile and to some extent mountainous. There are two seasons—the rainy season (April to November) and the dry season (December to March). The land has several streams; the dry season, however, is extremely desiccated. The region remains hot year round.

Today the Asante people number upwards of 6.2 million. Asante Twi, the majority language, is a member of the Central Tano languages within the Kwa languages. Asante political power combines Asantehene Otumfuo Nana Osei Tutu II as the political head of the Asantes and the Ashanti Region, with Asante semi-one-party state representative New Patriotic Party, and since the Ashanti Region (and the Kingdom of Asante) state political union with Ghana, the Asante remain largely influential.

Asantes reside in Asante and Brong Ahafo Regions in Ghana. Kumase metropolis, the capital of Asante (Kingdom of Asante), has also been the historic capital of the Asante Kingdom. The Ashanti Region currently has a population of 5,440,463.

Today, as in the past, the Ashanti Region continues to make significant contributions to Ghana's economy. Asante is richly endowed with industrial minerals and agricultural implements, Asante is responsible for much of Ghana's domestic food production and for the foreign exchange Ghana earns from cocoa, agricultural implements, gold, bauxite, manganese, various other industrial minerals, and timber. Kumase metropolis and Ashanti Region produces 96% of Ghana's exports.

== History ==
=== Asante Empire ===
Until the 1670s the Ashanti were a tributary state to the centralized Denkyira kingdom. It was then that Asantehene Osei Kofi Tutu I, military leader and head of the Oyoko clan, subdued surrounding states with the support of other clan chiefs. Osei Tutu finally defeated the Denkyira kingdom in 1701.

Realizing the weakness of a loose confederation of Akan states, Osei Tutu strengthened centralization of the surrounding Akan groups and expanded the power of the judiciary system within the centralized government. The kingdom grew into an empire as it looked to expand its land. Newly conquered areas had the option of joining the empire or becoming tributary states. Opoku Ware I, Osei Tutu's successor, extended the borders further.

== Sovereignty and independence ==
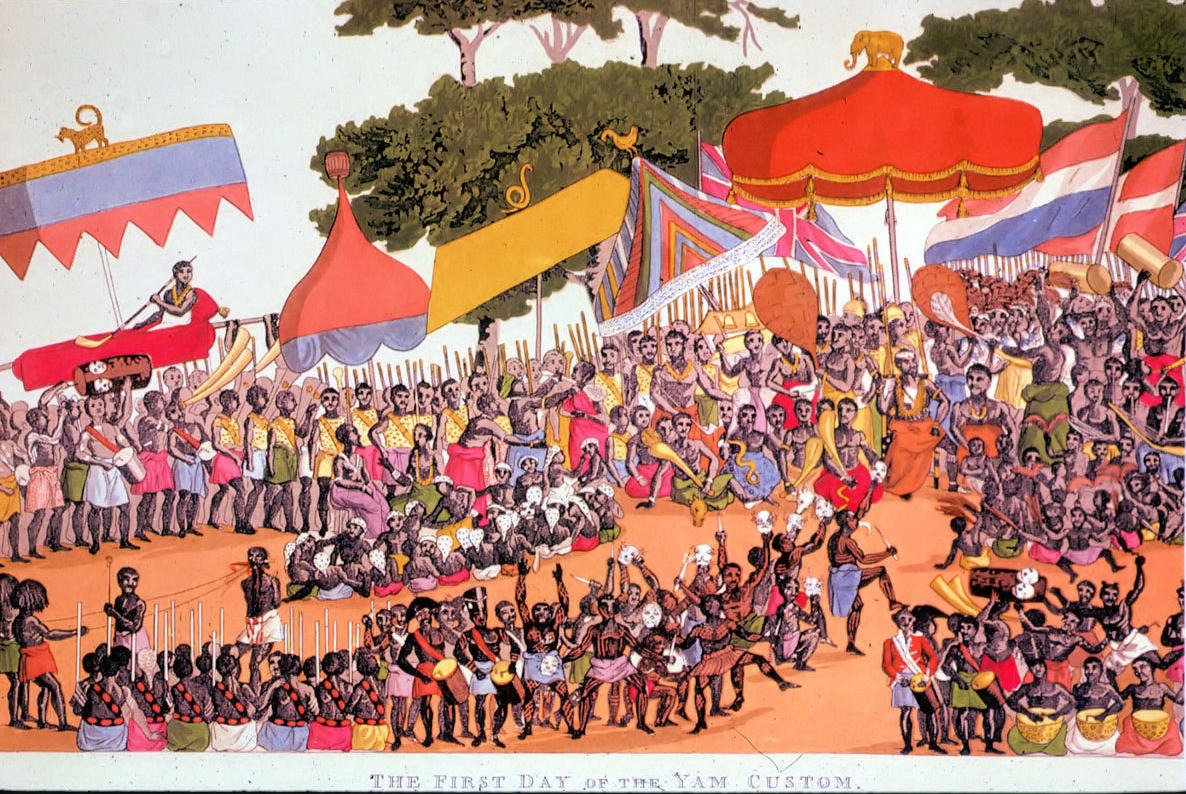
Asante yam ceremony, 19th century by Thomas Edward Bowdich

Because of the long history of mutual interaction between Asante and European powers, the Asante have the greatest amount of historiography in all of sub-Saharan Africa. In the 1920s the British catalogued Asante religion, familial, and legal systems in works such as R. S. Rattray's Asante Law and Constitution. The Asante state strongly resisted attempts by Europeans, mainly the Kingdom of Great Britain, to conquer them. The Asante limited British influence in the Asante State, as Britain annexed neighbouring areas. The Asante were described as a fierce organized people whose king "can bring 200,000 men into the field and whose warriors are evidently not cowed by Snider rifles and 7-pounder guns".

The Ashanti Empire was in fact one of the few African states that seriously resisted European colonization. Between 1823 and 1896, the United Kingdom of Great Britain and Ireland fought four wars against the Asante kings in what became known as the Anglo-Asante Wars. In 1901, following the 1900 War of the Golden Stool, the British finally defeated the Ashanti Empire and made it a British protectorate in 1902. The office of Asantehene was discontinued, with the Asante capital Kumasi annexed into the British empire; in practice, however, the Asante still largely governed themselves and gave little to no deference to colonial authorities. In 1926, the British permitted the repatriation of Asantehene Prempeh I – whom they had exiled to the Seychelles in 1896 – and allowed him to adopt the title Kumasehene, but not Asantehene. In 1935 the British finally granted the Asante self-rule sovereignty as the Kingdom of Asante, and the title Asantehene was revived.

== Culture and traditions ==
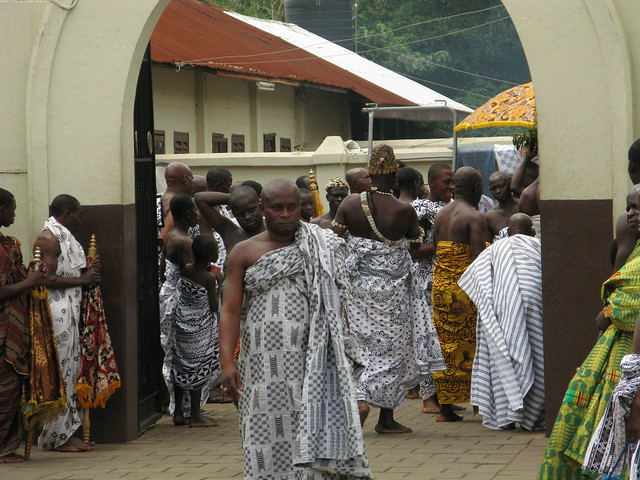
Akwasidae Celebration in Manhyia Palace in 2009

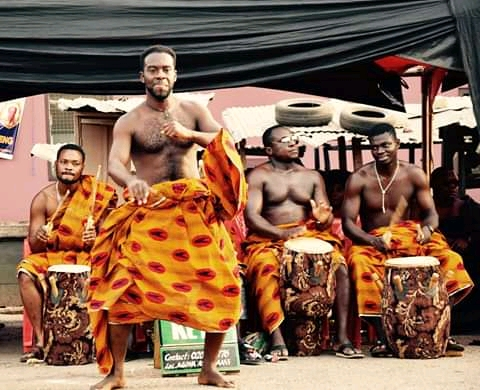
An Asante funeral in 2020

Asante culture celebrates Adae, Adae Kese, Akwasidae, Awukudae and Asante Yam festival. The Seperewa, a 10-14 stringed harp-lute, as well as the Fontomfrom drums, are originally from the Bono Akan people.

=== Society and customs ===
Asante consists of primarily matrilineal societies where line of descent is traced through the female. Usually, this mother-progeny relationship determines land rights, inheritance of property, offices and titles. But some Asante societies, like the Asante Bantama, are patrilineal. (In fact, the word 'bantama' means: 'my father gave it to me'.) For the Asante Bantama, patrilineal lineage determines inheritance rights, offices, and titles. Significantly for all of Asante, the Chief Warrior of Asante is always the chief of Bantama. As such, it is also true that the Asante inherit property from the paternal side of the family.

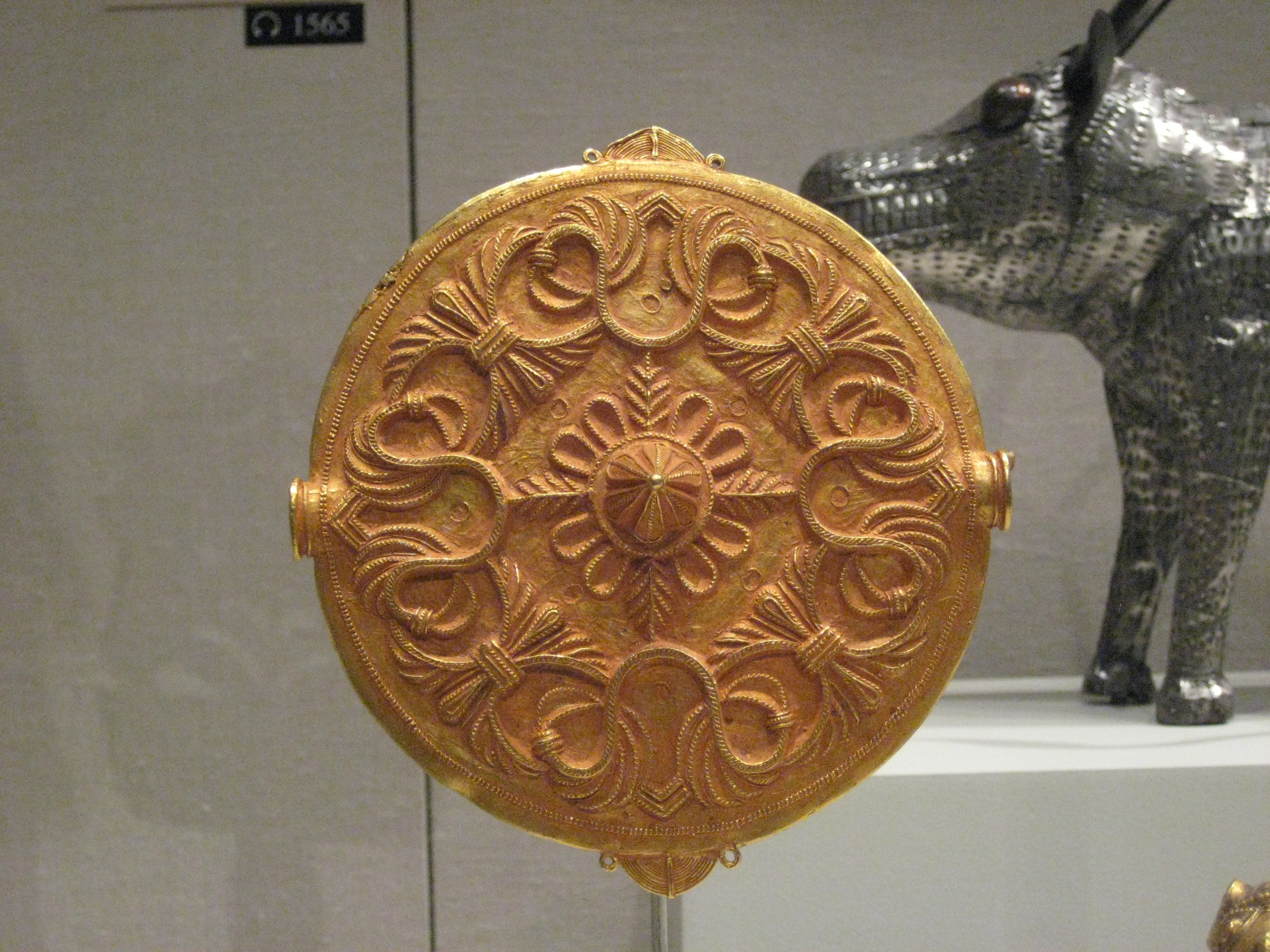
Asante soulwasher (Ashanti Sunsum Washer)

In addition to the mother, the father's interaction continues in the place of birth after marriage.

Historically, an Asante girl was betrothed with a golden ring called "petia" ('I love you'), if not in childhood, immediately after the puberty ceremony. They did not regard marriage "awade" as an important ritual event, but as a state that follows soon and normally after the puberty ritual. The puberty rite was and is important as it signifies passage from childhood to adulthood in that chastity is encouraged before marriage. The Asante required that various goods be given by the boy's family to that of the girl, not as a 'bride price', but to signify an agreement between the two families.

==== Asante womanhood ====
In the Asante culture, womanhood is marked by puberty rites termed bragoro. Bragoro is a long ceremony conducted for girls in the community from the ages of 13 to 20 after the onset of menstruation. Bragoro rites enable women to marry, showcase them to society, teach them how to be wives and mothers, and signify their coming of age.

In the bragoro rites, girls' heads are shaved and dyed black. Every day during the rites, younger girls in the community feed the chosen girls boiled eggs, fish, and eto. As well, older women in the community, called mmerewa, teach the girls about marriage, motherhood, and morality. The mmerewa bathe the girls in a neighboring stream. Then, the mmerewa dress the new women in white cloth (ntoma) and gold jewelry. Afterward, the girls are showcased to the entire community with songs, dances, and praises.

For the Asante, every color and object has cultural significance, which reflects the meaning of womanhood in Asante culture.

Ntoma/cloth

The white color of the ntoma (cloth) that the girls are dressed in signifies vitality, sanctity, victory, and purity.

Gold jewelry

The gold/yellow color of the jewelry that the girls are adorned with signifies royalty, continuous life, and wealth. This is related to the matrilineal system of the Asante. Assuming she marries an Asante who is not from Asante Bantama, the matrilineal system of the Asante can culturally give women a sense of authority, continuity, and the right to become a breadwinner and make money. However, female agency is independent of lineage rights, and can manifest itself equally in patrilineal systems in Asante as well, such as a case where a father would be expected to look after his children and pass property to his children and his wife (rather than his nephews/nieces), instead of having no such responsibility in a purely matrilineal system. This is displayed in the roles of adult women in society, obaapanin (female elder), and the ohemaa (queen) stool, which are considered high ranks.

Fish

In the bragoro rites, eating fish signifies the obtaining of wisdom and knowledge. Wisdom and Knowledge are seen as a keen part of womanhood for Asantes. In Asante royalty, the Asantehemaa (queen mother) is seen as the advisor of the Asantehene (king), full of wisdom and knowledge. This thought is carried through Asante culture and society to characterize the everyday woman, and convey a key aspect of Asante womanhood–being an advisor.

=== Law and legal system ===
In the cataloguing of Asante familial and legal systems in R.S. Rattray's Asante Law and Constitution Asante law specifies that sexual relations between a man and certain women are forbidden, even though not related by blood. The punishment for offense is death, although it does not carry quite the same stigma to an Asante clan as incest. Sexual relations between a man and any one of the following women is forbidden:

1. A half-sister by one father, but by a different clan mother;
2. A father's brother's daughter;
3. A woman of the same father;
4. A brother's wife;
5. A son's wife;
6. A wife's mother;
7. An uncle's wife;
8. A wife of any man of the same "company";
9. A wife of any man of the same guild or trade;
10. A wife of one's own slave;
11. A father's other wife from a different clan.

=== Language ===
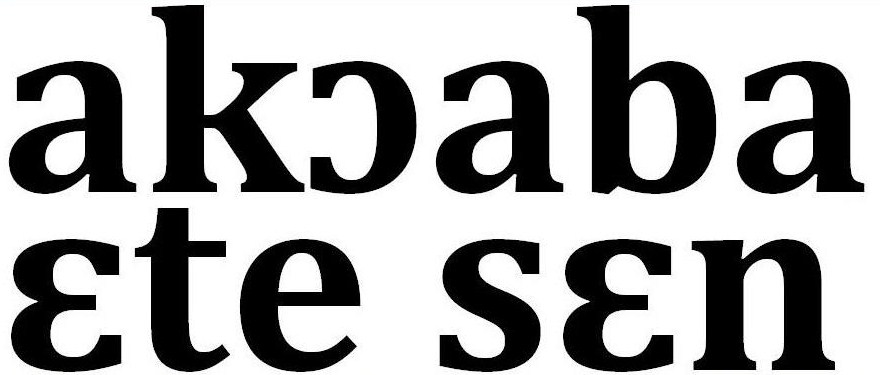
Asante Twi greeting phrases; "akwaba" (welcome) and "ɛte sɛn" (how are you)

An Asante Twi speaker

The Asante people speak Asante Twi, which is the official language of the Ashanti Region and the main language spoken in Asante and by the Asante people. Asante Twi is spoken by over 9 million ethnic Asante people as a first or second language, and is the official language taught in both schools and universities.

Characteristic features of Asante Twi include tone, vowel harmony and nasalization.

=== Religion ===
The Asante follow Akan religion and the Asante religion (a traditional religion which seems to be dying slowly but is revived only on major special occasions—yet is undergoing a global revival across the diaspora), followed by Christianity (Roman Catholicism and Protestantism) and Islam.

Asante people received the religion of Islamic North Africa within their talismanic tradition, making amulets with Quranic citations, name of the Arabic angels or Jinn. Amulets were also set in the corners of houses or soaked in water to produce liquids for drinking and for washing that were believed to have thaumaturgical properties.

== Asante diaspora ==
The Asante live in the Ashanti Region, specifically in the capital of Kumasi, and, due to the Atlantic slave trade, a known diaspora of Asante exists in the Caribbean, mainly in Jamaica. During wars and conflicts with other Akan groups (such as the Fante Confederacy), a significant number of Asante people were captured and sold as slaves to the British. This caused a significant Asante influence among the enslaved people of Jamaica. Asante slaves were mainly sent to the West Indies, particularly Jamaica, Barbados, Netherlands Antilles, British Virgin Islands, the Bahamas, Guyana, Suriname, etc. Asante were known to be very opposed to both the Fante Confederacy and the British, as the Asante only traded with the Dutch in times of their ascension to becoming a hegemony of most of the area of present-day Ghana.

== Notable people of Asante origin ==
Coromantee, the English-language term for enslaved Akan people, came from the original name of the Dutch fort of Fort Amsterdam (Fort Kormantse). But the Dutch had no jurisdiction there and the Cormantin people (not to be confused with the prisoners of the Fort), blocked Dutch trade until they paid huge sums of money. The locals population only favoured the British. They loved the British so much Cormantin chief gave his sister up to Richard Brew as his bride and concubine. In turn, many Asantes were sold to Jamaica from Fort Kormantse. Evidence of Asante and Akan-day names and Asante and Akan-surnames (but mispronounced by the English), Adinkra symbols on houses, Anansi stories and the dialect of Jamaican Patois being heavily influenced by Twi, can all be found on the island of Jamaica. White planter Edward Long, like other planters before him, described "Coromantees" the same way that the British in the Gold Coast would the "Asantes", which was to be "warlike". Edward Long states that others around "Asantes" and "Coromantees" feared them the same way as they were feared in Jamaica and from the hinterlands of the Gold Coast.

According to BioMed Central (BMC biology) in 2012, the average Jamaican has 60% of Asante matrilineal DNA, and today Asante is the only ethnic group known by name to contemporary Jamaicans. Marcus Garvey and his first wife, Amy Ashwood Garvey, were of Asante descent. So were the Jamaican freedom fighters during slavery Nanny of the Maroons (now a Jamaican National Heroine) and Jack Mansong or Three-finger Jack. "Nanny" is a corruption of the Asante word Nana, meaning "king/queen/grandparent", and Mansong is a corruption of the Asante surname Manso, respectively.

== Gallery ==
Ashanti cultural artifacts, regalia and other forms of symbolism

Ashanti National Emblem of the Ashanti Region

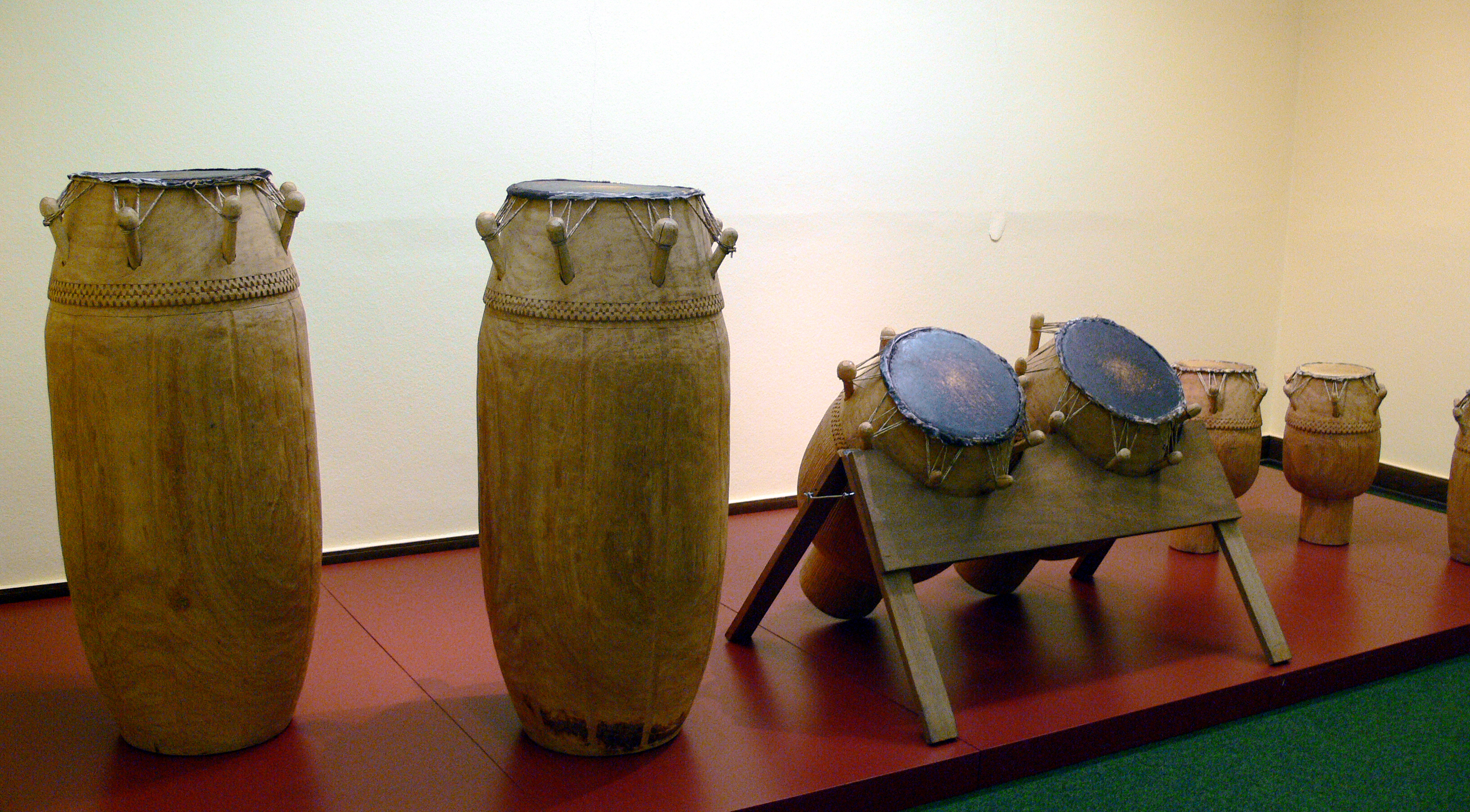
Fontomfrom (Ashanti talking drum and drums)

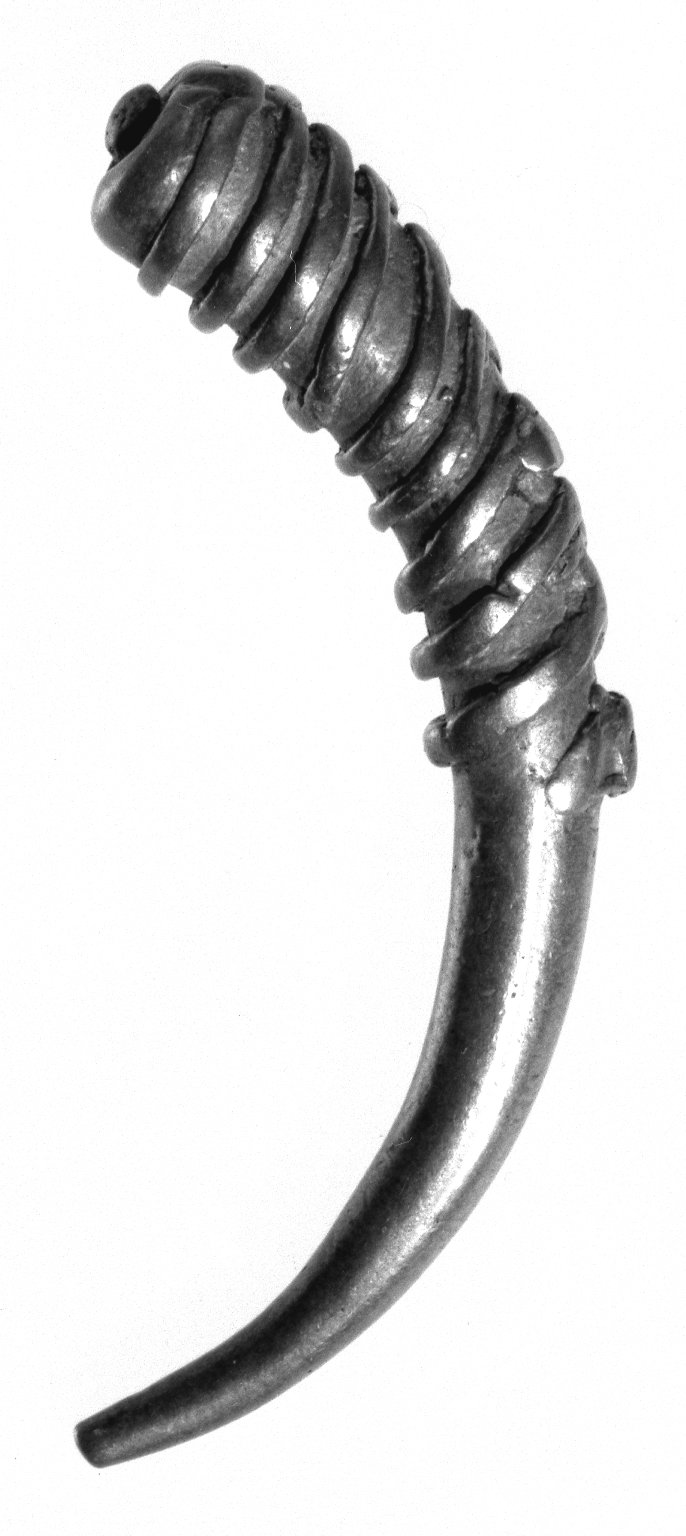
Ashanti Blowing Horn

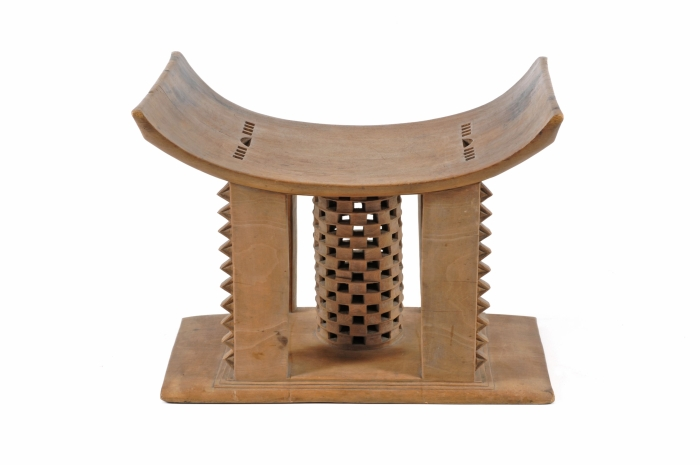
Ashanti Stool Dwa

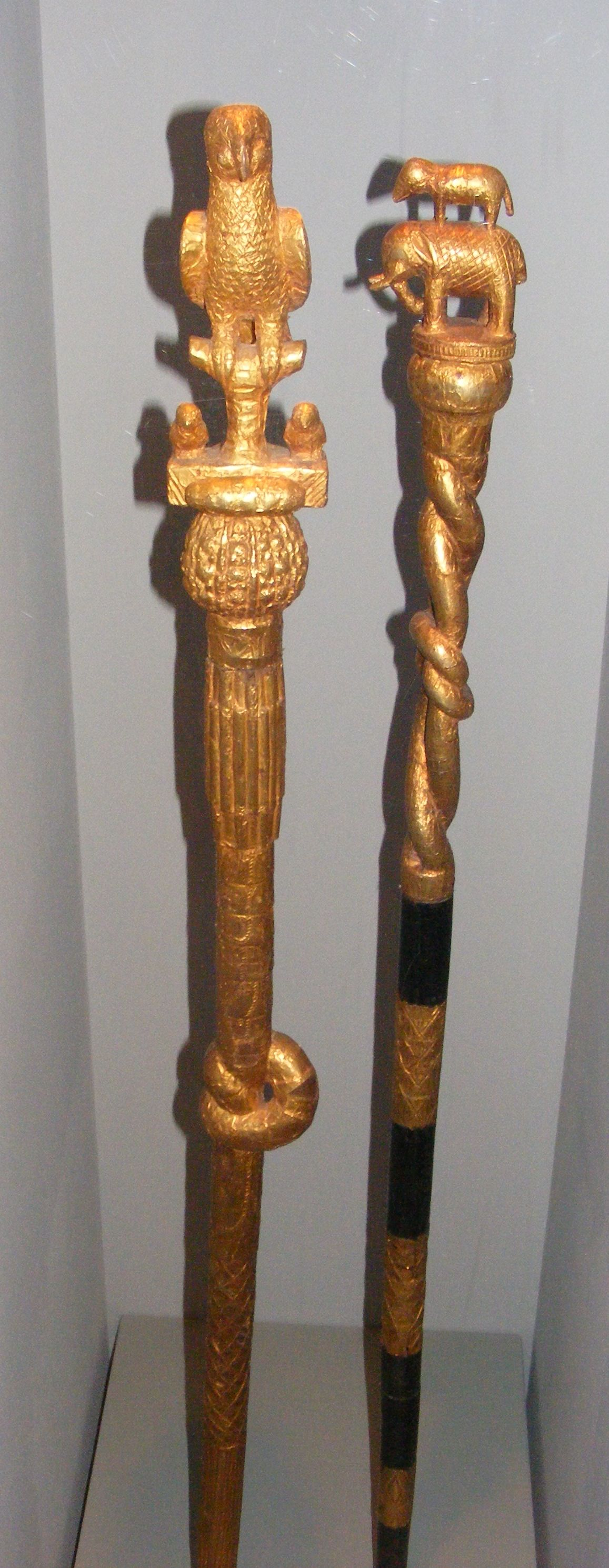
Ashanti Regalia (Asante Gold plated spokesman rod and Asante combat stick)

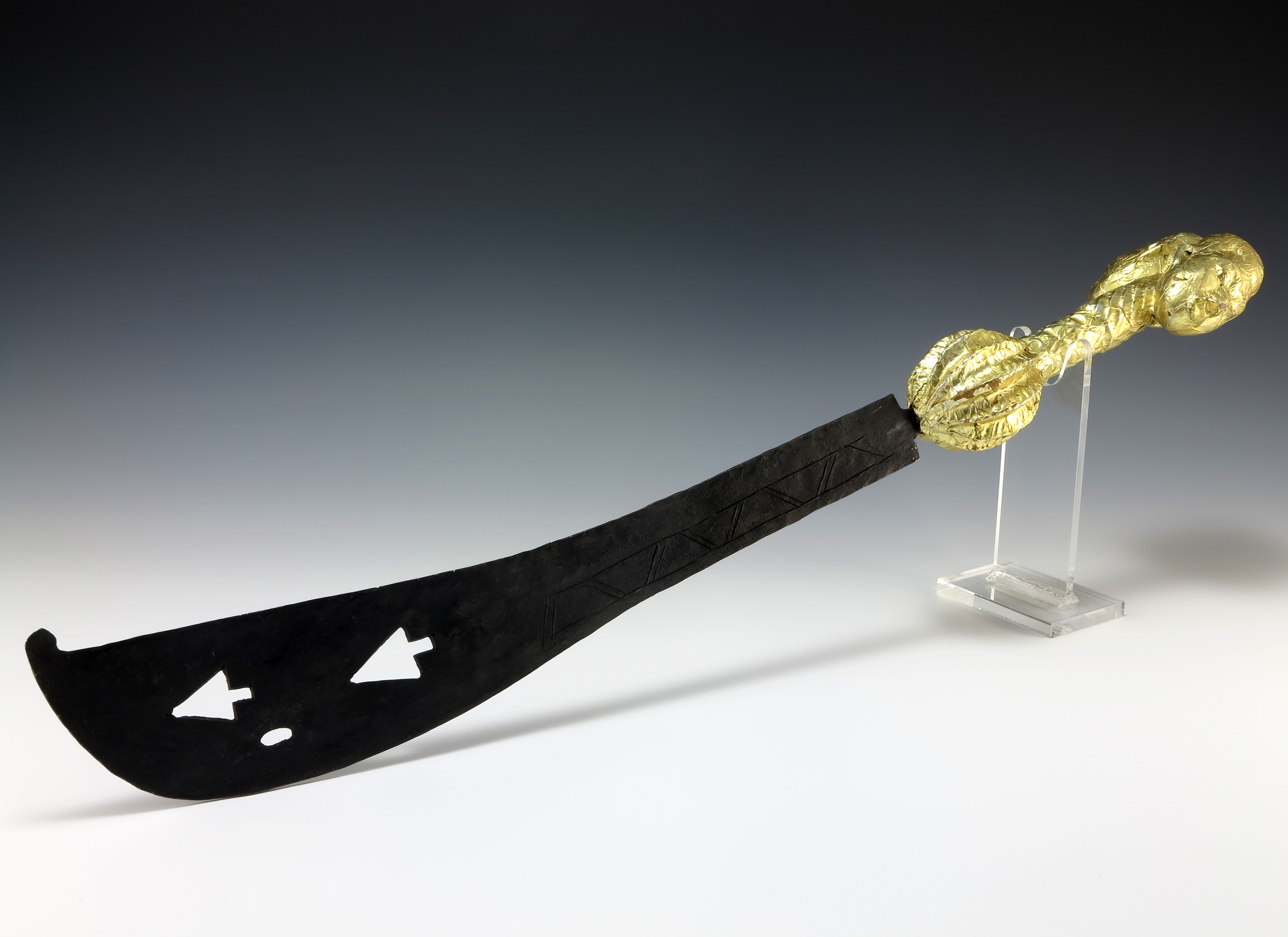
20th Century Asante Akrafena (Ashanti Sword with Gold-ring pommel)

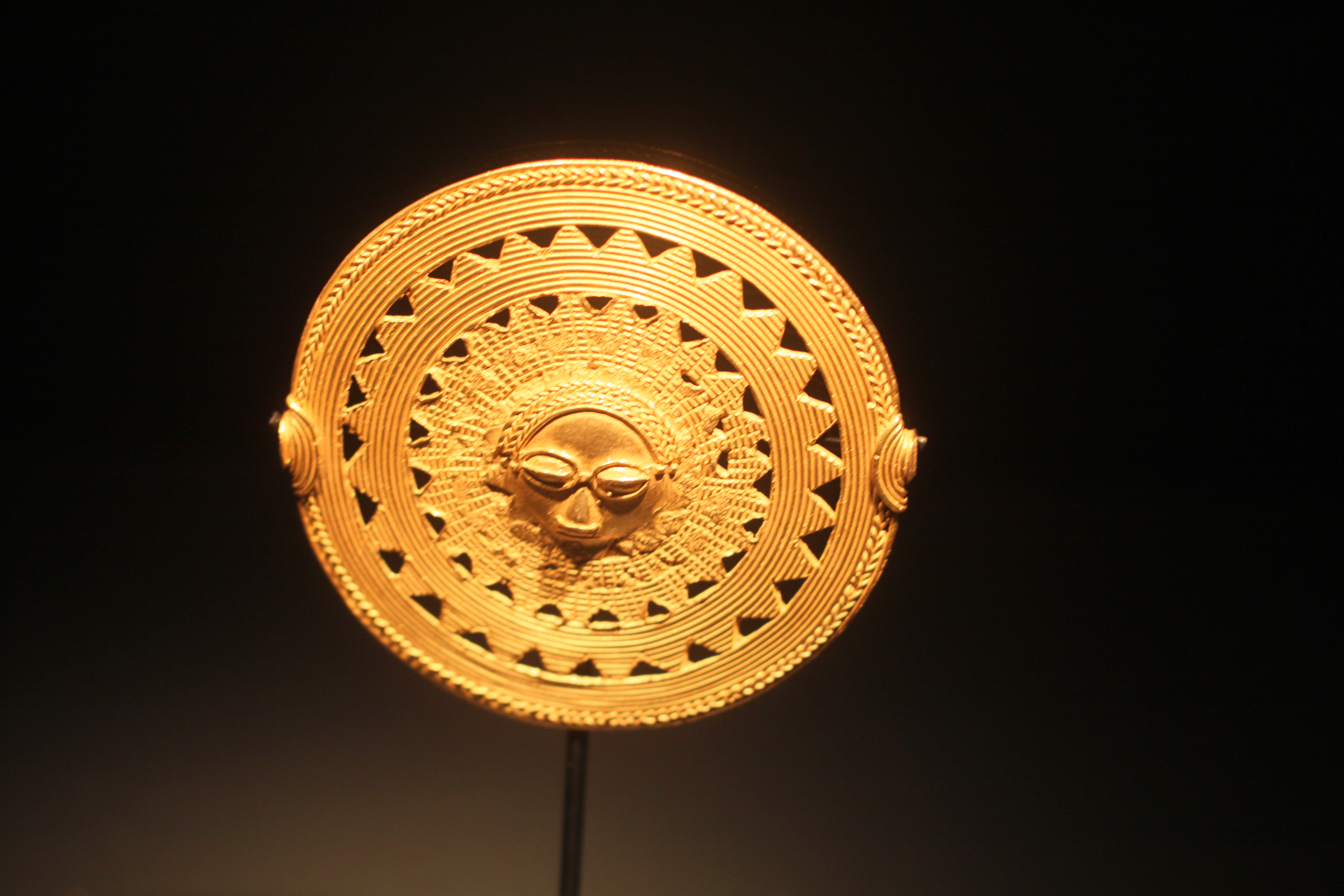
Ashanti Gold plated Shield

== See also ==
- List of rulers of Asante
- Momome

== Literature ==
- Edgerton, Robert B. The Fall of the Asante Empire. The Hundred-Year War for Africa's Gold Coast. New York, 1995 ISBN 0-02-908926-3
- Kyeremateng, N.; Nkansa, K. The Akans of Ghana: their history & culture. Accra: Sebewie Publishers, 1996
- Lloyd, Alan. The Drums of Kumasi. London: Panther, 1964
- Obreng, Ernest E. Ancient Asante Chieftaincy. Ghana Publishing Corporation, 1986 ISBN 9964-1-0329-8
- Quarco, Alfred Kofi. The Language of Adinkra Symbols. Legon, Ghana: Sebewie Ventures (Publications), PO Box 222, Legon, 1972, 1994 ISBN 9988-7533-0-6
- Kevin Shillington. History of Africa. New York: St. Martin's Press, 1995 (1989)
- Warren, Dennis M. The Akan of Ghana: An Overview of the Ethnographic Literature. Accra: Pointer, 1986
