= Punctuality =

Doing something at or before a previously designated time

Punctuality is the characteristic of completing a required task or fulfilling an obligation before or at a previously designated time based on job requirements and or daily operations. "Punctual" is often used synonymously with "on time". An opposite characteristic is tardiness, or more colloquially "being late".

Each culture tends to have its own understanding about what is considered an acceptable degree of punctuality. Typically, a small amount of lateness is acceptable—this is commonly about five to ten minutes in most Western cultures—but this is context-dependent, for example it might not be the case for doctor's appointments.

Some cultures have an unspoken understanding that actual deadlines are different from stated deadlines, for example with African time where times for some types of casual or social events arrival time is implied. For example, it may be understood in a particular culture that people will turn up later than advertised. In this case, since everyone understands that a 9 p.m. party will actually start at around 10 p.m., no-one is inconvenienced when everyone arrives at 10 p.m.

In cultures that value punctuality, being late is seen as disrespectful of others' time and may be considered insulting. In such cases, punctuality may be enforced by social penalties, for example by excluding low-status latecomers from meetings entirely. Such considerations can lead on to considering the value of punctuality in econometrics and to considering the effects of non-punctuality on others in queueing theory.

== See also ==
- Etiquette – Customary code of polite behaviour
- Time limit – Amount of time to complete a task
- Time management – Planning time spent on specific activities
