= Akwasidae Festival =

Festival in Ghana by the Ashantis

Akwasidae Festival/Kwasi festival
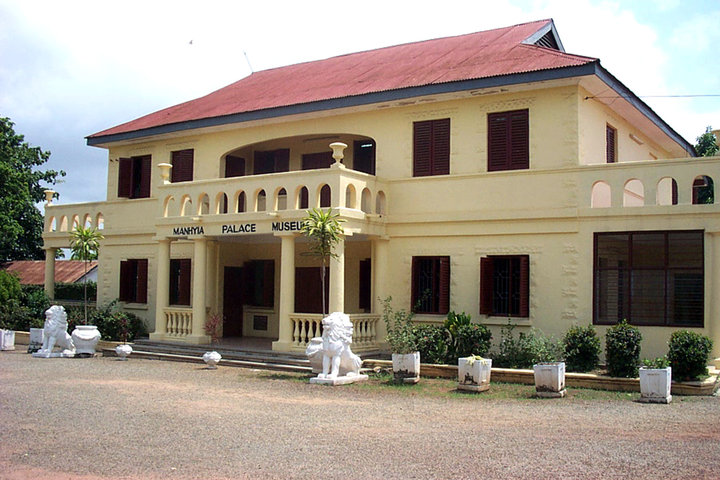
- Manhyia Palace Museum where the festivals are held in Kumasi
- Observed by: Ashanti of Asanteman
- Significance: Festival of commemoration of ancestors
- Celebrations: Marks the seasons and the timings for various agricultural activities
- Date: Sunday, once every six weeks
- Frequency: 9 times per year

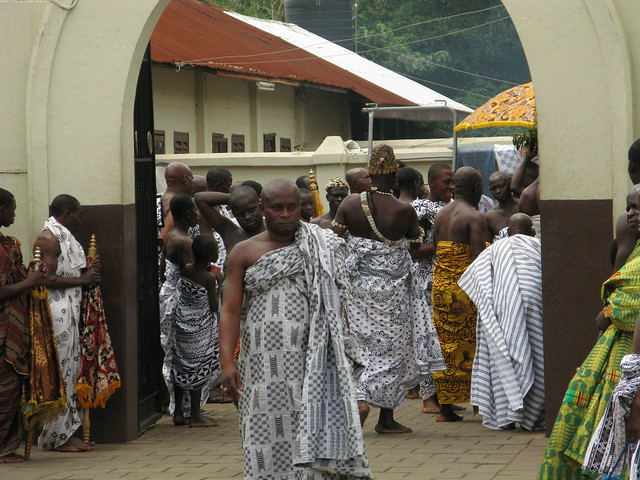
Akwasidae Celebration in Manhyia Palace in 2009.

The Akwasidae Festival (alternate, Akwasiadae) is celebrated by the Ashanti people and chiefs in Ashanti, as well as the Ashanti diaspora. The festival is celebrated on a Sunday, once every six weeks.

== Observance ==
The Akan annual calendar is divided into nine months, which last approximately six weeks but vary between 40 and 42 days in a period; the celebration of this period is called the Adae Festival. The Adae Festival has two celebration days: the Akwasidae Festival is celebrated on the final Sunday of the period, while the Awukudae Festival is celebrated on a Wednesday within the period. The Friday preceding 10 days to the Akwasidae is called the Fofie (meaning a ritual Friday). As the festival is always held on Sundays (Twi in Kwasidae), its recurrence could be after 40 or 42 days in accordance with the official calendar of Ashanti. During the last Akwasidae of the year, which coincides with the Adae Kese Festival, special attention is given to making food offerings and donations for helping people. The Adae Kese Festival is the largest festival in the Asanti religion. The Adae Kese Festival is about the cleansing of the Golden stool. The festivals of Adae are not interchangeable, as they were fixed from ancient times.

== Practices ==
The rites on this day relate to honouring personal and community ancestors. A gathering called Akom occurs in which drumming, dancing and singing are a normal celebration to honour Abosom (lesser gods in the Akan tradition) and Nsamanfo (spiritually cultivated ancestors). Food offerings include special items such as eto (mashed African yam), garnished with hard-boiled eggs. Every Ashanti celebrates this festival. For those Ashanti who do not observe the festival of Odwira, the Akwasidae is very important to commemorate their ancestors.

On this day, the Asantehene (King of Ashante) meets his subjects and subordinate chiefs in the courtyard of the Manhyia Palace. The Golden Stool (throne) is displayed at the palace grounds in the presence of the king, and people visit in large numbers, singing and dancing. The king holds his durbar on the occasion of the festival, and people have the liberty to shake hands with him. Before holding the durbar, the king goes in a procession in a palanquin decorated with gold jewelry. He also witnesses a colourful parade, from his palace grounds at Kumasi. Participants of the parade include drum beaters, folk dancers, horn-blowers and singers. As it is festival of paying respect to ancestors, the king visits the Bantama Mausoleum and offers worship not only to his ancestors' chairs (stools), but also to the skeletal remains of his ancestors. It is argued that, the king do not worship the stools and the ancestors, however to pay them homage.

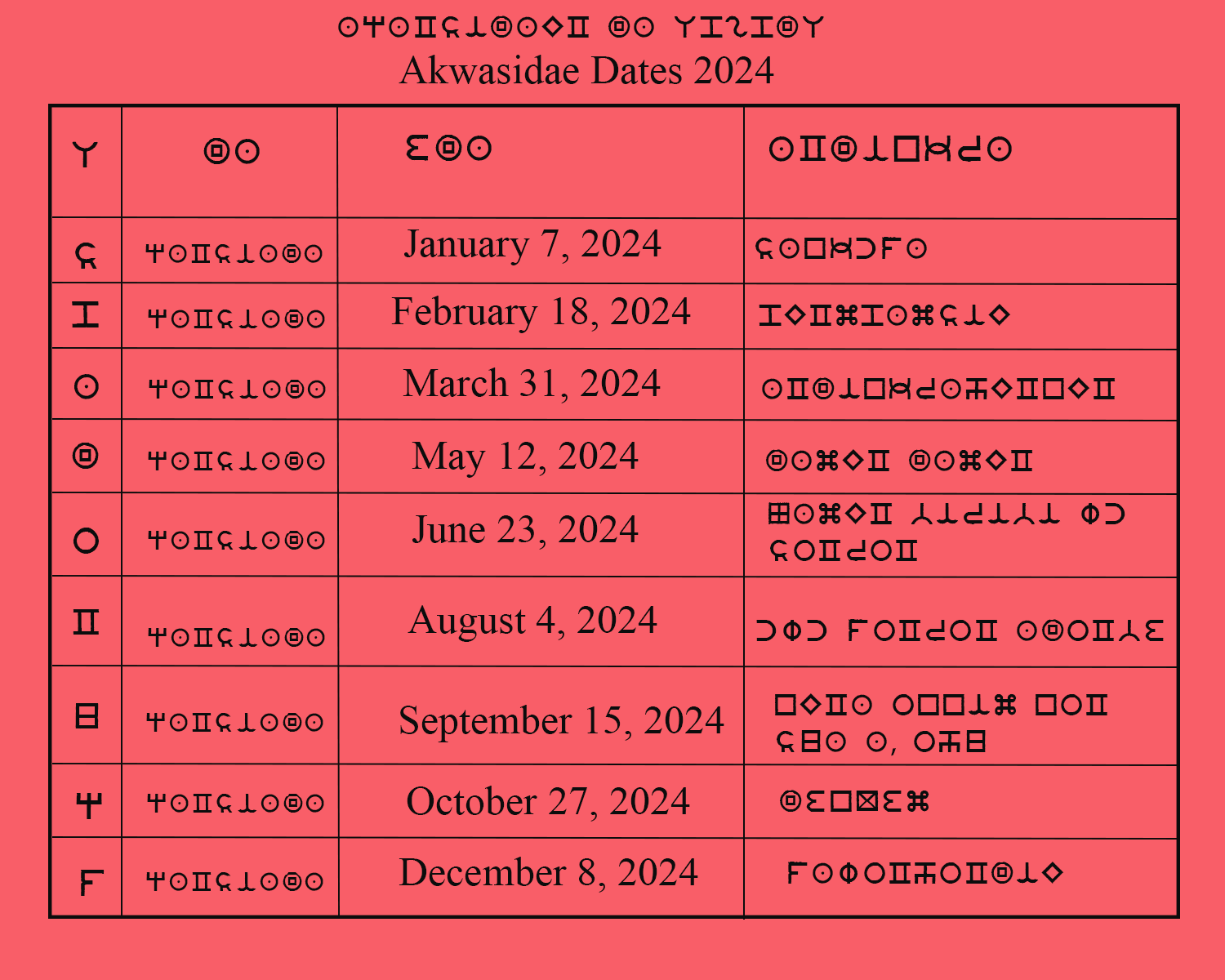
Akwasidae calendar for 2024

== See also ==
- Ashanti Yam Festival
- Adae Festival
- Adae Kese Festival
- Awukudae Festival

== Bibliography ==
- Ayisi, Eric O. (1992). An Introduction to the Study of AfricanCulture. East African Publishers. p. 83. ISBN 9789966466174.
- Braffi, Emmanuel Kingsley (2002). Akwasidae and Odwira festivals. Mystic House. p. 10.
- Fuller, Linda K (2004). National Days/National Ways: Historical, Political, And Religious Celebrations Around THe World. Greenwood Publishing Group. p. 103. ISBN 9780275972707.
- Pierre, Yvette La (2004). Ghana in Pictures. Twenty-First Century Books. p. 55. ISBN 9780822519973.
- Opokuwaa, Nana Akua Kyerewaa (30 May 2005). The Quest for Spiritual Transformation: Introduction to Traditional Akan Religion, Rituals And Practices. iUniverse. pp. 92–. ISBN 978-0-595-35071-1.
