= Ashanti Yam Festival =

Festival in Ghana by the Ashantis

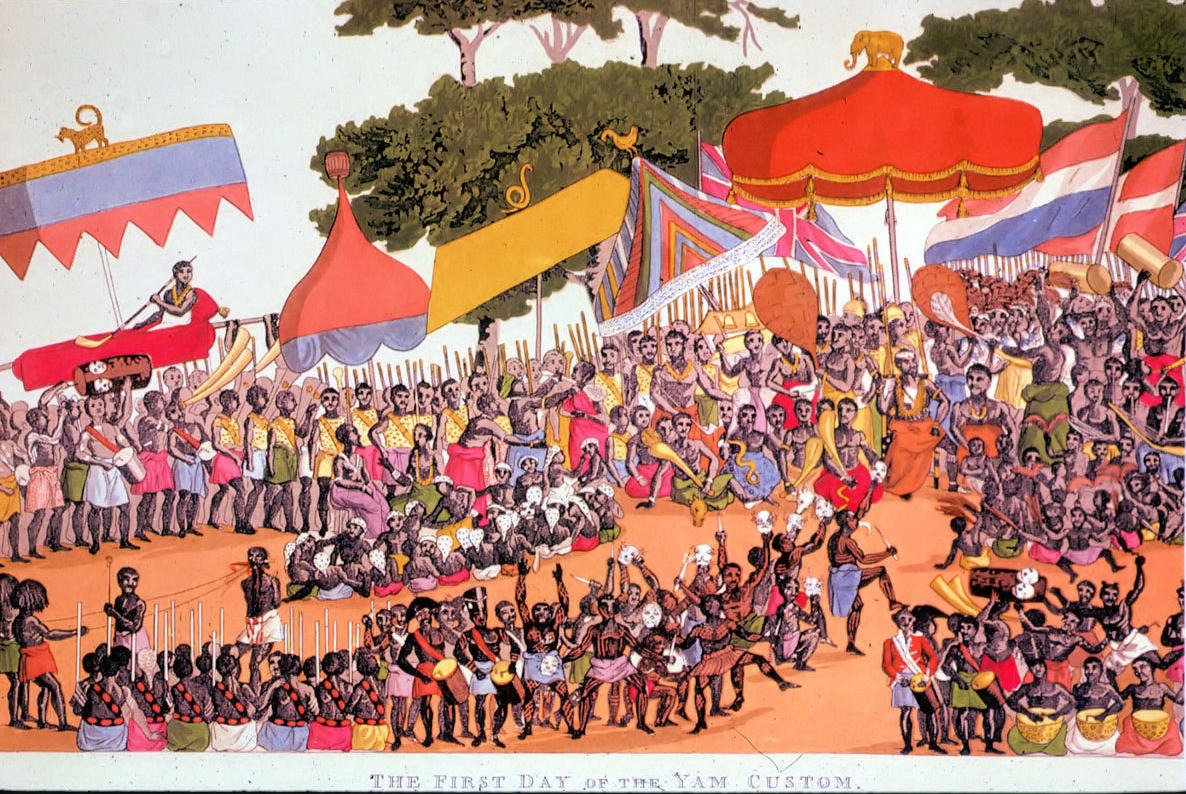
- Ashanti yam ceremony, Asanteman. A painting of a yam ceremony from 1817.
- Observed by: Ashantis of Asanteman
- Type: Ashanti festival
- Significance: Festival of Purification
- Celebrations: To celebrate Yam Harvest
- Date: Between September and December
- Duration: 5 days
- Frequency: annual

The Ashanti Yam Festival is an annual celebration of the Ashanti people of Ashanti. It marks the first harvest of yams during the autumn season, after the monsoon season. The yam is the staple food crop in Ashanti and most of Africa.

== Observance ==
The festival, a national holiday, is observed for five days starting with a Tuesday, as dictated by the local chief priest. It marks the first harvest of yams during the autumnal season, subsequent to the monsoon season. This festival has both religious and economic significance. Religiously, the festival is used to thank the god and the ancestors for the new harvest and to traditionally outdoor the new yam.

== Traditions ==
The first offering of the crop is made to the ancestral gods by the chief priest of the Ashanti; the religious rite includes taking the yams on the second day of the festival in a procession to the ancestral ground. Music and dance are part of the festivities on all the five days. The festival is also popular because the King supervises the performance of the ablution ceremony by cleaning all the ancestral royal Stools (chairs). Another tradition during this festival is the melting of royal gold ornaments, ancient in design, and with due approval of the Government, to fashion them into new designs. During this festival, the King does not permit human sacrifice, nor is the death drum allowed to be beaten as it is an auspicious occasion of purification.

== Rituals ==
Before the start of the festival celebrations, the king inspects the Dampan structure which is erected temporarily to hold the public function. On the first day of the festival, the way to the burial ground of the Chiefs of Asantis is swept clean. On the second day, the yam is carried by the priests in a colourful procession for offering to the ancestors buried in the burial chambers. Only after this offering is completed are people allowed to consume the new crop of yam. The third day is observed as a mourning day for the ancestors and also to keep a fast. On the fourth day, the chief hosts a dinner at his house for all people. On the night of the fourth day, people remain indoors to avoid witnessing the cleansing of the chiefs' thrones, symbols of the dead people's spirits, in the Draa River at Kumasi. On the fifth day, a grand parade of the chief and his family, and courtiers, all dressed in regal finery, proceeds through the streets to pay respects to the senior local chief at his residence. In the parade, some people are carried in colourful decorated palanquins shaded by umbrellas.

== See also ==
- Adae Festival
- Adae Kese Festival
- Akwasidae Festival
- Awukudae Festival
