= African time =

Cultural attitude to time

African time (or Africa time) is the perceived cultural tendency in parts of Africa and the Caribbean toward a more relaxed attitude to time. This is sometimes used in a pejorative sense, about tardiness in appointments, meetings and events. This also includes the more leisurely, relaxed, and less rigorously scheduled lifestyle found in African countries, especially as opposed to the more clock-bound pace of daily life in Western countries. As such, it is similar to time orientations in some other non-Western culture regions such as South and West Asia. In 2014, Nigerian-American filmmaker Chijindu Kelechi Eke explored this topic as a cultural rift through his film, African Time.

== Aspects ==
The appearance of a simple lack of punctuality or a lax attitude about time in Africa, may instead reflect a different approach and method in managing tasks, events, and interactions. African cultures are often described as "polychronic", which means people tend to manage more than one thing at a time rather than in a strict sequence. Personal interactions and relationships are also managed in this way, such that it is not uncommon to have more than one simultaneous conversation. An African "emotional time consciousness" has been suggested which contrasts with Western "mechanical time consciousness".

In the Caribbean, "...[t]hings just won't always happen as quickly or as precisely as you may be accustomed to". Due to the cultural influence of "Caribbean time" or "island time", locals do not have the sense of time pressure that is part of Western culture.

== Colored people's time ==
Colored People's Time (also abbreviated to CP Time or CPT) is an American expression referring to African Americans as frequently being late. It claims that African Americans can have a relaxed or indifferent view of punctuality, which leads to them being labeled as lazy or unreliable.

According to NPR's podcast Code Switch, the phrase has variations in many other languages and cultures, is often used as a light-hearted comment or joke regarding being late, and may have first been used in 1914 by The Chicago Defender newspaper.

There are differences between monochronic societies and polychronic societies (e.g., some of those found in Sub-Saharan Africa).

== Reactions to time orientation in Africa and the Caribbean ==
=== Self-criticism and commentary ===
The concept of African time has become a key topic of self-criticism in modern Africa. According to one Ghanaian writer,

One of the main reasons for the continuing underdevelopment of our country is our nonchalant attitude to time and the need for punctuality in all aspects of life. The problem of punctuality has become so endemic that lateness to any function is accepted and explained off as 'African time.'

In October 2007, an Ivorian campaign against African time, backed by President Laurent Gbagbo, received international media attention when an event called "Punctuality Night" was held in Abidjan to recognize business people and government workers for regularly being on time. The slogan of the campaign is "'African time' is killing Africa – let's fight it." Reuters reported that "organizers hope to heighten awareness of how missed appointments, meetings or even late buses cut productivity in a region where languid tardiness is the norm". It was remarked that this year's winner, legal adviser Narcisse Aka—who received a $60,000 villa in recognition of his punctuality—"is so unusually good at being punctual that his colleagues call him 'Mr White Man's Time'". Some Western tourists in the Caribbean "...become infuriated if locals don't respond as promptly or as efficiently to every request as employees or service personnel do back home".

=== Popular culture ===
The contrast between African time and Western time is illustrated in the award-winning short film Binta and the Great Idea. The protagonist of the film, a fisherman in a small village in Senegal, struggles to understand the new concepts brought back from Europe by his friend; these are symbolized by a Swiss wristwatch, which rings at various times to the delight of the friend, but for no apparent reason. The fisherman is shown making his way through the various ranks of officials with his idea, which in turn criticizes Western culture's obsession with efficiency and progress.

The expression Colored people's time has been referenced numerous times in various types of media, including the films Friday Foster, The Best Man, Bamboozled, Undercover Brother, Let's Do It Again, House Party, BlacKkKlansman, and several television series: The Mindy Project, Prison Break, The Boondocks, The Wire, Weeds, Where My Dogs At?, Reno 911!, 30 Rock, Everybody Hates Chris, A Different World, The PJs, Bridezillas, Mad TV, Cedric the Entertainer Presents, In Living Color, Empire, F Is for Family, and reality series The Real Housewives of Atlanta and The Real Housewives of Potomac.

Colored People's Time was used as the name of a 1960s public interest program produced by Detroit Public Television. It was also used in the title of the 1983 play, Colored People's Time: A History Play, written by Leslie Lee, which consisted of 13 fictional vignettes of African American history, from the Civil War through Civil Rights and the Montgomery bus riots. CP Time was also a 2007 book by J. L. King.

In his 1982 book Let the Trumpet Sound: The Life of Martin Luther King, Jr., author Stephen B. Oates notes that Martin Luther King Jr. and his staff operated by what they jocularly called "CPT"—Colored People's Time—"and kept appointments with cheerful disregard for punctuality". King once apologized for being late for a banquet, saying he forgot what time he was on—EST, CST, or Colored People's Time, adding that "It always takes us longer to get where we're going."

On April 9, 2016, in a staged joke skit at that year's annual Inner Circle dinner, Mayor of New York City Bill de Blasio said he'd been operating on "C.P. time" for his delay in endorsing Hillary Clinton as the Democratic Party nominee for president. The actor Leslie Odom Jr., then starring in the Broadway show Hamilton, then replied "I don't like jokes like that, Bill," after which Clinton delivered the punch line that CPT stood for "cautious politician time." This skit was widely criticized, with The Root calling it "cringeworthy" while the conservative outlet TownHall pointed to a double standard that, "It's only racist if Republicans do it." In response, President Barack Obama, during the 2016 White House Correspondents' Dinner on April 30, jokingly apologized for being late because of "running on C.P.T." adding that this stands for "jokes white people should not make".

In February 2018, Roy Wood Jr. presented a segment on The Daily Show called "CP Time" to celebrate Black History Month by "honoring the unsung heroes of black history". It has since become a recurring segment on the show.

== See also ==
- Slow movement (culture)
- Procrastination
- Tardiness § Ethnic stereotypes
- Time management
