= Koffikro-Afféma =

- Village
- Location in Ivory Coast
- Coordinates: 5°35′N 2°59′W
- Country: Ivory Coast
- District: Comoé
- Region: Sud-Comoé
- Department: Aboisso
- Sub-prefecture: Maféré
- Time zone: UTC+0 (GMT)

Koffikro-Afféma is a village in south-eastern Ivory Coast. It is in the sub-prefecture of Maféré, Aboisso Department, Sud-Comoé Region, Comoé District. The border with Ghana is six kilometres northeast of the village.

Koffikro-Afféma was a commune until March 2012, when it became one of 1,126 communes nationwide that were abolished.
