= Aby =

Aby or ABY may refer to:

== Places ==
=== Transport infrastructure ===
- Ashburys railway station's station code
- Ambivli railway station (station code: ABY), Maharashtra, India
- Southwest Georgia Regional Airport in Albury, State of Georgia, USA (IATA airport code ABY)

=== Other places ===
- Aby, Ivory Coast
- Aby Lagoon, a lagoon in Ivory Coast
- Abyy or Aby, Sakha Republic, Russia
  - Aby Lowland
- Aby, Lincolnshire, a village in England, UK
- Åby, Norrköping Municipality, Sweden
- Åby, Växjö Municipality, Sweden

== Other uses ==
- Aby (film), a 2017 Malayalam-language Indian film
- Aby (name), a given name and surname, including a list of people with the name
- Abyssinian cat, or Abys, a shorthair cat breed
- Aneme Wake language (ISO 639-3 code "aby")
- ABY, a system of measuring fictional dates in Star Wars relative to the Battle of Yavin

== See also ==
- Aaby (disambiguation) (for Åby)
- Abby (disambiguation)
- Aby-Mohoua, Ivory Coast
