= Ono, Ivory Coast =

Ono
- Village
- Location in Ivory Coast
- Coordinates: 5°24′N 3°32′W
- Country: Ivory Coast
- District: Comoé
- Region: Sud-Comoé
- Department: Grand-Bassam
- Sub-prefecture: Bongo
- Time zone: UTC+0 (GMT)

Ono is a village in southeastern Ivory Coast. It is in the sub-prefecture of Bongo, Grand-Bassam Department, Sud-Comoé Region, Comoé District.

Ono was a commune until March 2012, when it became one of 1,126 communes nationwide that were abolished.
