= Songan =

- Village
- Location in Ivory Coast
- Coordinates: 6°6′N 3°13′W
- Country: Ivory Coast
- District: Comoé
- Region: Sud-Comoé
- Department: Aboisso
- Sub-prefecture: Bianouan
- Time zone: UTC+0 (GMT)

Songan is a village in southeastern Ivory Coast. It is in the sub-prefecture of Bianouan, Aboisso Department, Sud-Comoé Region, Comoé District.

Songan was a commune until March 2012, when it became one of 1,126 communes nationwide that were abolished.
