= Roa, Ivory Coast =

Roa
- Village
- Location in Ivory Coast
- Coordinates: 5°19′N 3°21′W
- Country: Ivory Coast
- District: Comoé
- Region: Sud-Comoé
- Department: Adiaké
- Sub-prefecture: Adiaké
- Time zone: UTC+0 (GMT)

Roa is a village in southeastern Ivory Coast. It is in the sub-prefecture of Adiaké, Adiaké Department, Sud-Comoé Region, Comoé District.

Roa was a commune until March 2012, when it became one of 1,126 communes nationwide that were abolished.
