= Ghana–Ivory Coast border =

International border

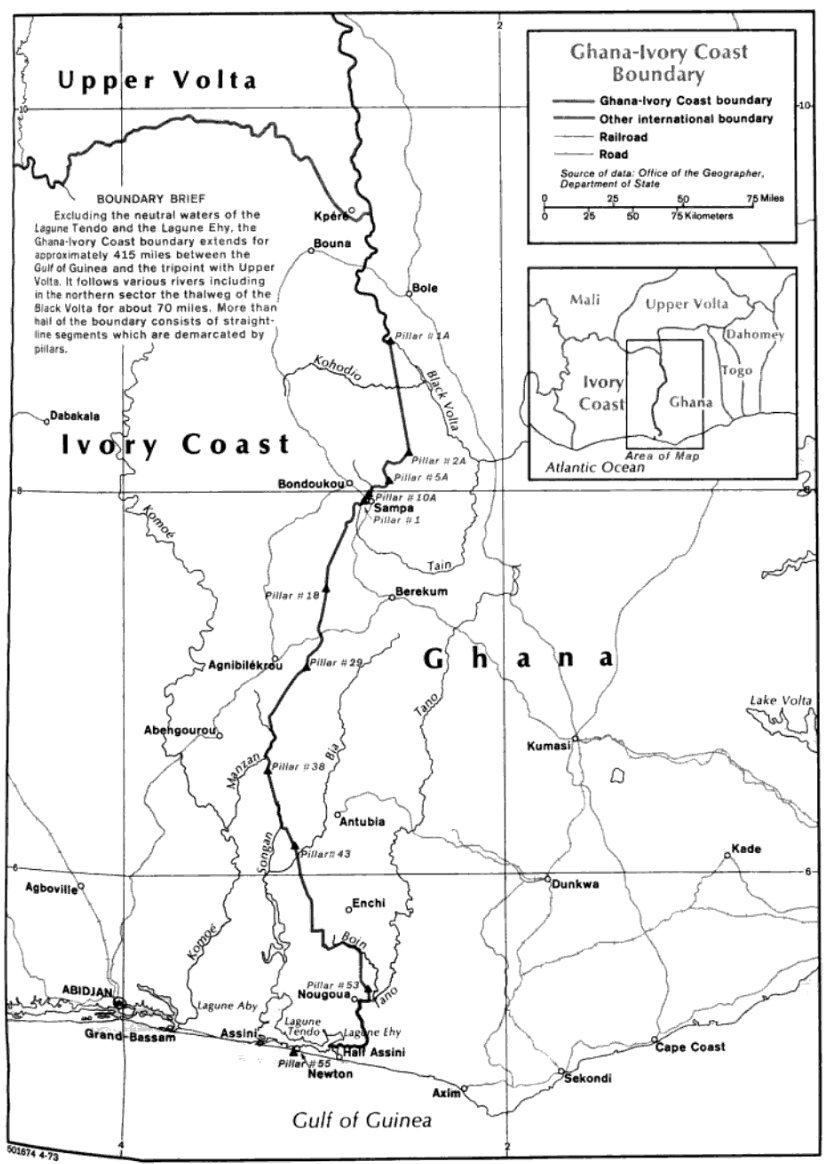
Map of the Ghana-Ivory Coast border

The Ghana–Ivory Coast border is 720 km (447 mi) in length and runs from the tripoint with Burkina Faso in the north to the Atlantic Ocean in the south.

== Description ==
The border starts in the north at the tripoint with Burkina Faso on the Black Volta river, following this river southwards. The border then follows a straight line overland orientated to south-east, before turning south-west via a series of irregular lines. The border then follows a broad arc, composed predominately of overland lines as well as some streams, before reaching the Tano River. The border then follows the Tano as it flows to the south-west into Aby Lagoon; it then runs along the southern shore of the adjoining Lake Tendo, before veering southwards overland down to the Atlantic coast.

== History ==
Europeans had begun exploring the coast of Ghana (then referred to as the Gold Coast) from the 15th century, and it became the centre of a various trading networks, notably in gold and slaves; Germany, Sweden, Denmark, Portugal and the Netherlands all had trading posts here. Britain also took an interest in the region, and during the 19th century became the predominant regional power, taking over all the rival trading posts and declaring the Gold Coast colony in 1867. The British gradually extended their rule into the interior, against often determined resistance by native kingdoms such as the Asante; the northern region of what is now Ghana was annexed to the Gold Coast colony in 1901. France had begun signing treaties with chiefs along the modern Ivorian coast in the 1840s, thereby establishing a protectorate which later became the colony of Ivory Coast in 1893. This later became part of the federal colony of French West Africa (Afrique occidentale française, abbreviated AOF).

Britain and France delimited a border between the two territories on 10 August 1889 as far north as the 9th parallel north. A further treaty of 26 June 1891 confirmed this border, and also stated that the Black Volta would form the border in the far north. A more detailed boundary agreement was concluded on 12 July 1893 covering the Atlantic-9th parallel section. The northern Black Volta section was re-confirmed in an agreement of 14 June 1898. The border was then demarcated in much greater detail in an agreement of 1 February 1903, with beacons and pillars demarcating the border on the ground; the two governments then formally approved this border in May 1905. Some further demarcation work occurred in 1924.

The Gold Coast gained full independence from Britain (as Ghana) in 1957; France granted Ivory Coast independence in 1960, and their mutual frontier became an international one between two sovereign states. The two states conducted some joint re-demarcation in the late 1960s-early 1970s.

== Settlements near the border ==
=== Ghana ===
- Buanfo
- Gbenshe
- Babianiha
- Amutinkrom
- Debiso
- Dormaa Ahenkro
- Sampa
- Susai
- Dadiaso
- Omanpe
- Jema
- Elubo
- Half Assini
- New Town

=== Ivory Coast ===
- Bouna
- Tanbi
- Kineta
- Bondoukou
- Yango
- Transua
- Aouyakrou
- Ebilassekrou
- Bianouan
- Koffikro
- Noé

== Border crossings ==
The main border crossing is at Elubo (GHA)-Noe (CIV); lesser-used crossings are located at Dormaa Ahenkro and Sampa.

== See also ==
- Ghana–Ivory Coast relations
