= Frambo =

- Village
- Location in Ivory Coast
- Coordinates: 5°8′N 2°58′W
- Country: Ivory Coast
- District: Comoé
- Region: Sud-Comoé
- Department: Tiapoum
- Sub-prefecture: Tiapoum
- Time zone: UTC+0 (GMT)

Frambo is a village in the far southeast of Ivory Coast. It is in the sub-prefecture of Tiapoum, Tiapoum Department, Sud-Comoé Region, Comoé District.

Frambo was a commune until March 2012, when it became one of 1,126 communes nationwide that were abolished.
