= Ayénouan =

- Village
- Location in Ivory Coast
- Coordinates: 5°22′N 3°20′W
- Country: Ivory Coast
- District: Comoé
- Region: Sud-Comoé
- Department: Aboisso
- Sub-prefecture: Adaou
- Time zone: UTC+0 (GMT)

Ayénouan is a village in south-eastern Ivory Coast. It is in the sub-prefecture of Adaou, Aboisso Department, Sud-Comoé Region, Comoé District.

Ayénouan was a commune until March 2012, when it became one of 1,126 communes nationwide that were abolished.
