= Larabia =

- Village
- Location in Ivory Coast
- Coordinates: 5°19′N 3°29′W
- Country: Ivory Coast
- District: Comoé
- Region: Sud-Comoé
- Department: Grand-Bassam
- Sub-prefecture: Bonoua
- Time zone: UTC+0 (GMT)

Larabia is a village in south-eastern Ivory Coast. It is in the sub-prefecture of Bonoua, Grand-Bassam Department, Sud-Comoé Region, Comoé District.

Larabia was a commune until March 2012, when it became one of 1,126 communes nationwide that were abolished.
