= Abissa =

New year festival of the Nzema people

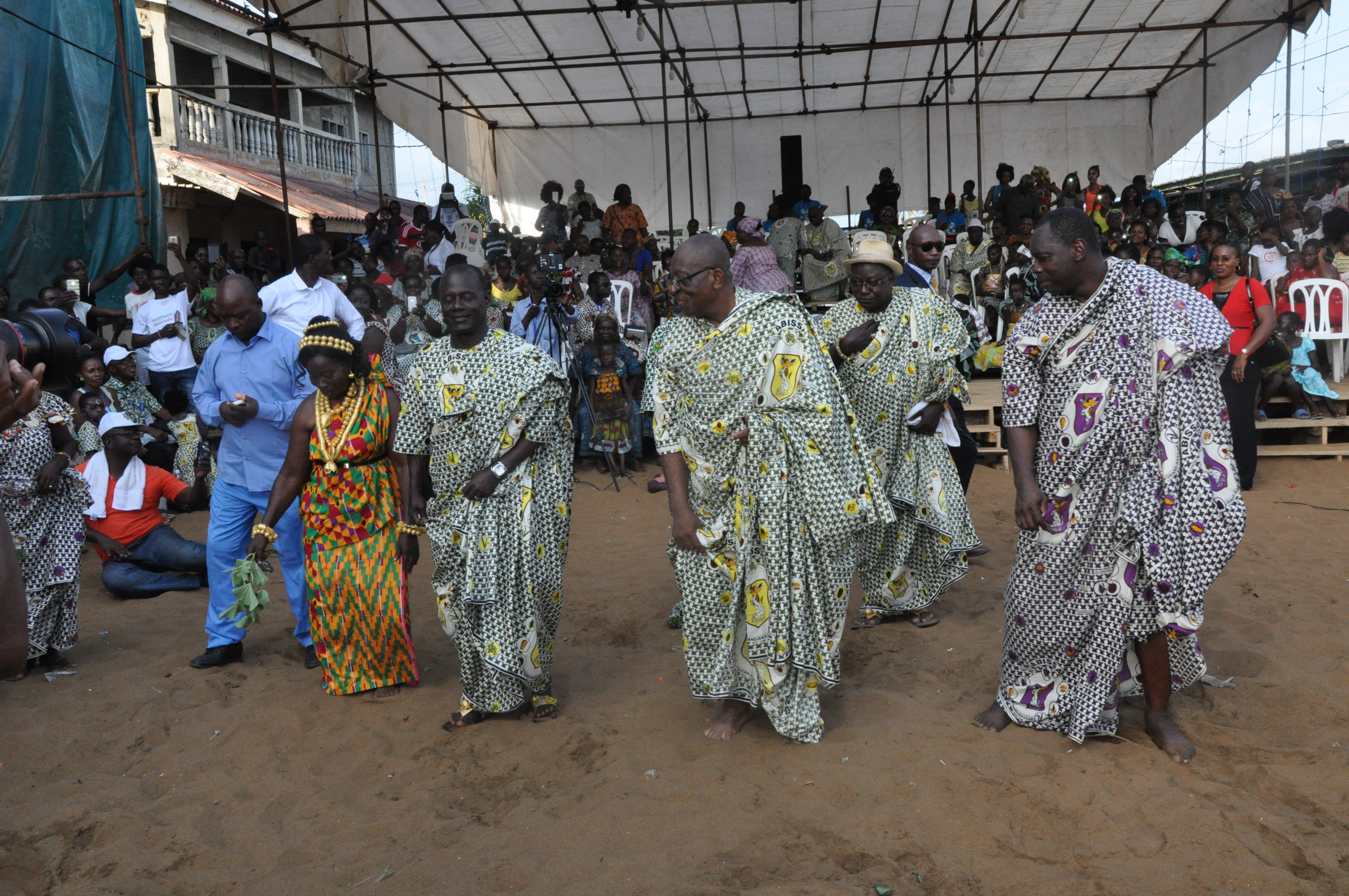
- Nobles N'Zima at Abissa 2015
- Dates: October–November
- Frequency: Annual
- Locations: Ivory Coast; Grand-Bassam
- Founded: 1800

The Abissa (or Abyssa) is a traditional festival of the Nzema people that celebrates the new year. It takes place in the towns of Grand-Bassam, Tiapoum, and the villages of Nouamou, N'guiémé, and Eboinda in Ivory Coast. The festival occurs between October and November.

== History ==
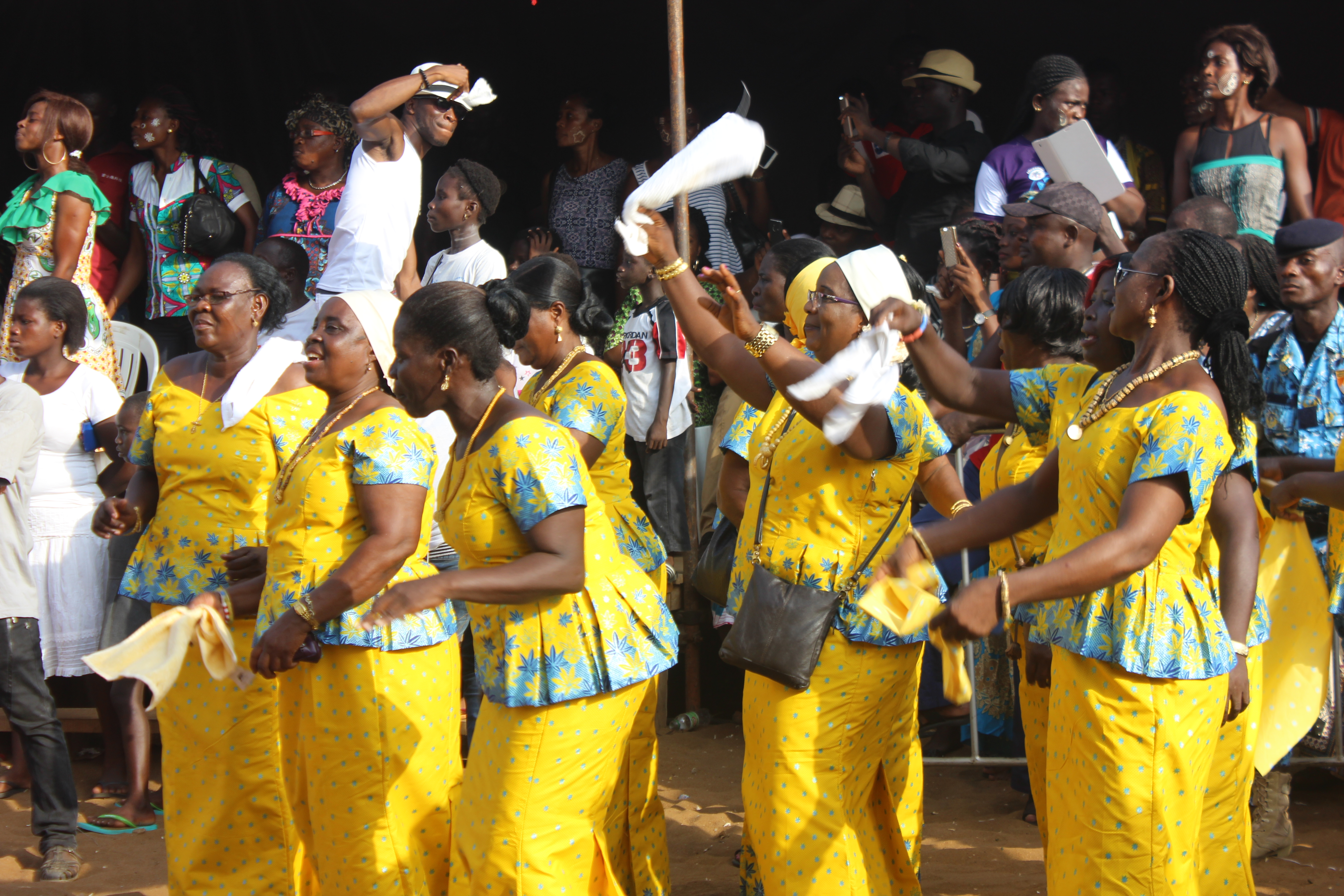
Women dancing at Abissa 2016.

The Abissa festival has existed since the 1800s. Originally, Abissa was known as "Koudoum", which consisted of performing mystical sacrifices. It later became known as "Abissadjë", which was shortened to Abissa, meaning "intended to ask friends for help".

Abissa was organized by the N'vavilé family of the N'Zima, comprising the Ahantans of Takoradi and the Appolos of Bégnry, which includes the Evawlê, Djômôlô, Elêbrê, Adouvlais, and Adjoufoulê subgroups. The festival is conducted by rotation and relay among the various Nzema subgroups in Ivory Coast and Ghana.

The Nzema Evawlê of Ghana initiate the festival, followed by the Djômôlô, Elêbrê, and Ahantan. When they conclude, they pass the responsibility to Ivory Coast, where the Adouvlais of the Tiapoum region take over, followed by the Adjoufoulê of Grand-Bassam. This alliance between these peoples has existed for more than two centuries.

== Cultural significance ==
Every year, between late August and early December, over the course of one week, the Nzema people gather together. Families take advantage of these reunions, centered around the king and the "Edo N'gbolé" drum, to express their wishes and encourage the notables to better manage the community's economy.

The Abissa festival attracts thousands of visitors each year.

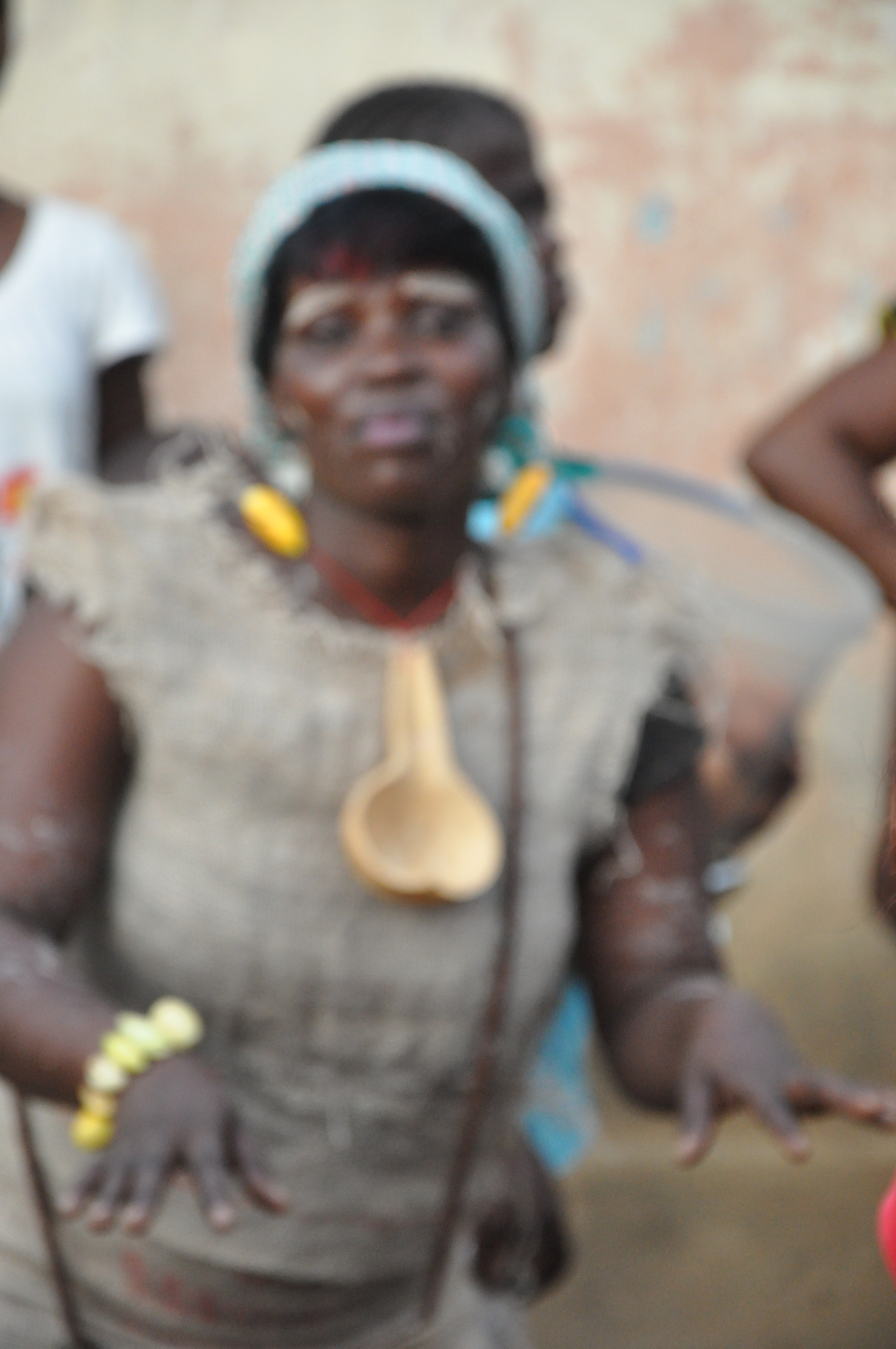

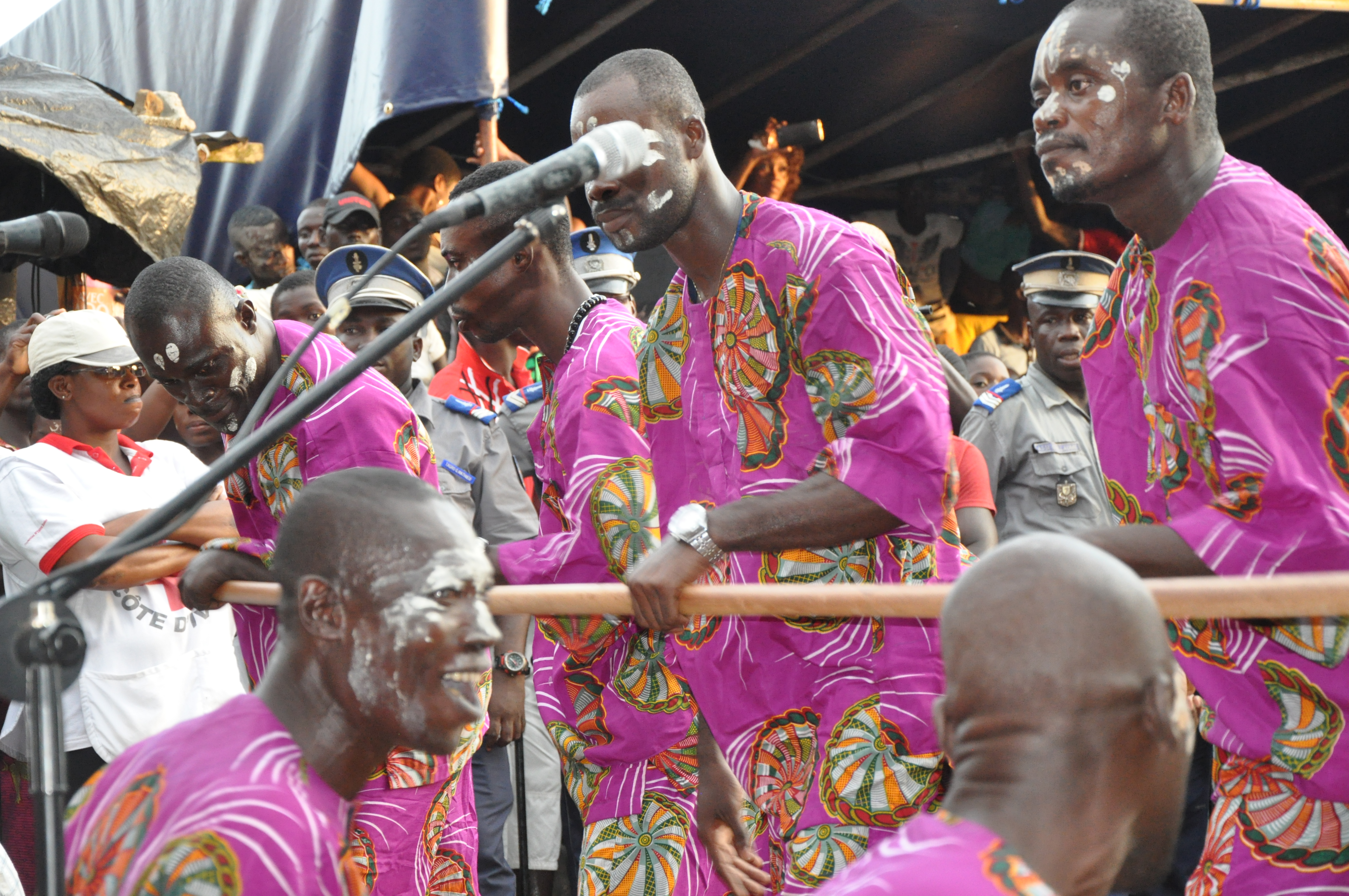

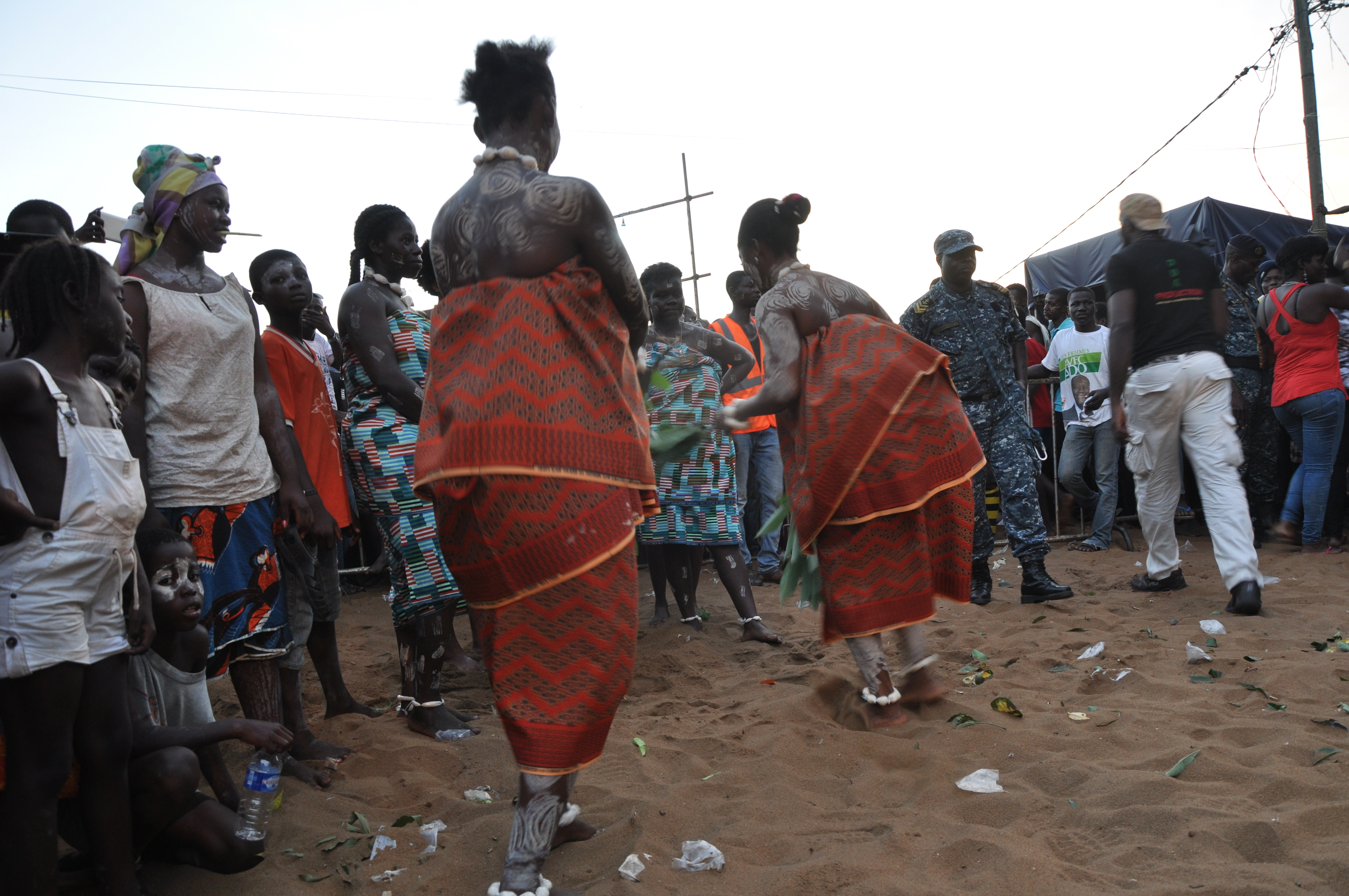

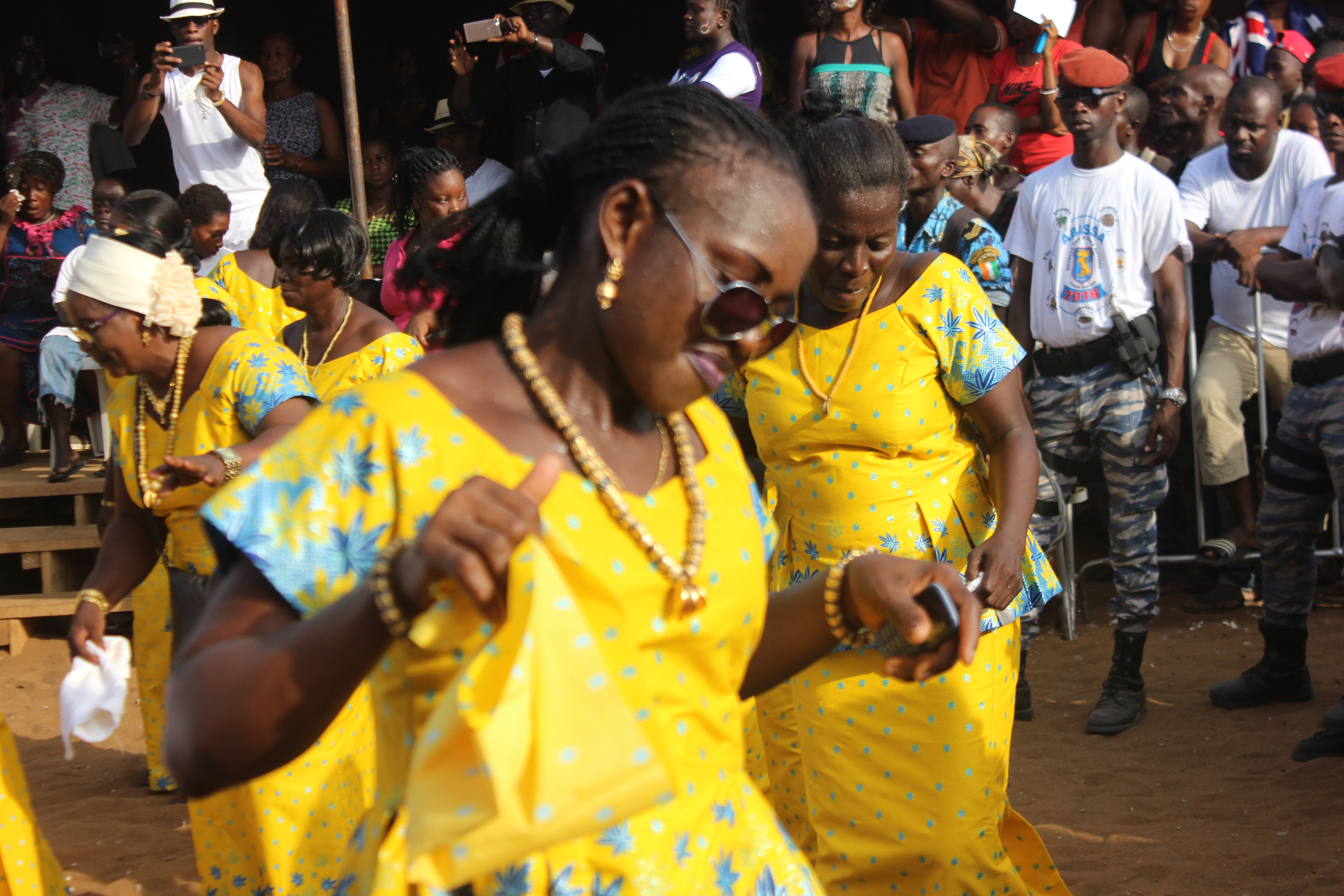

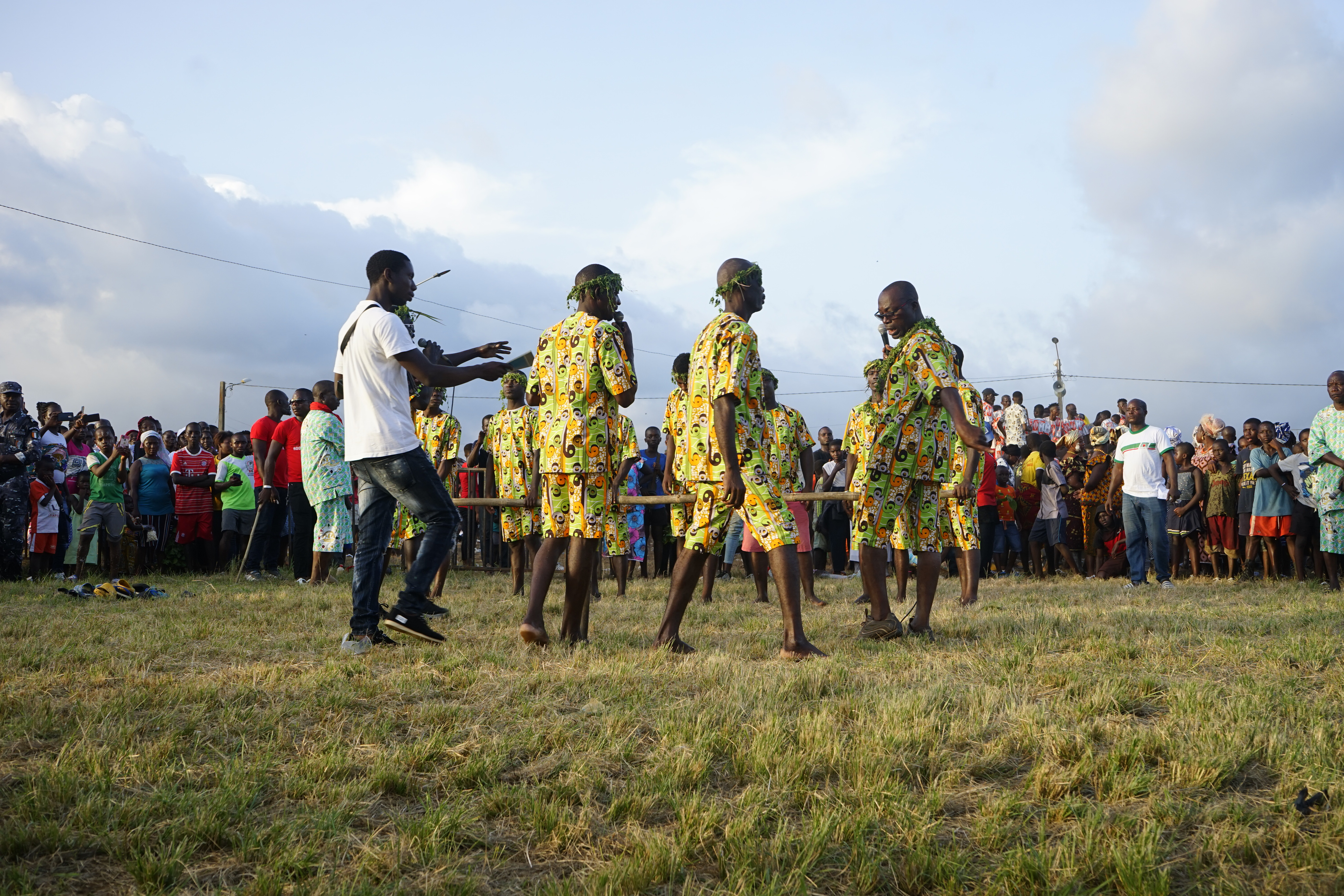
Original Abissa of N'guiémé

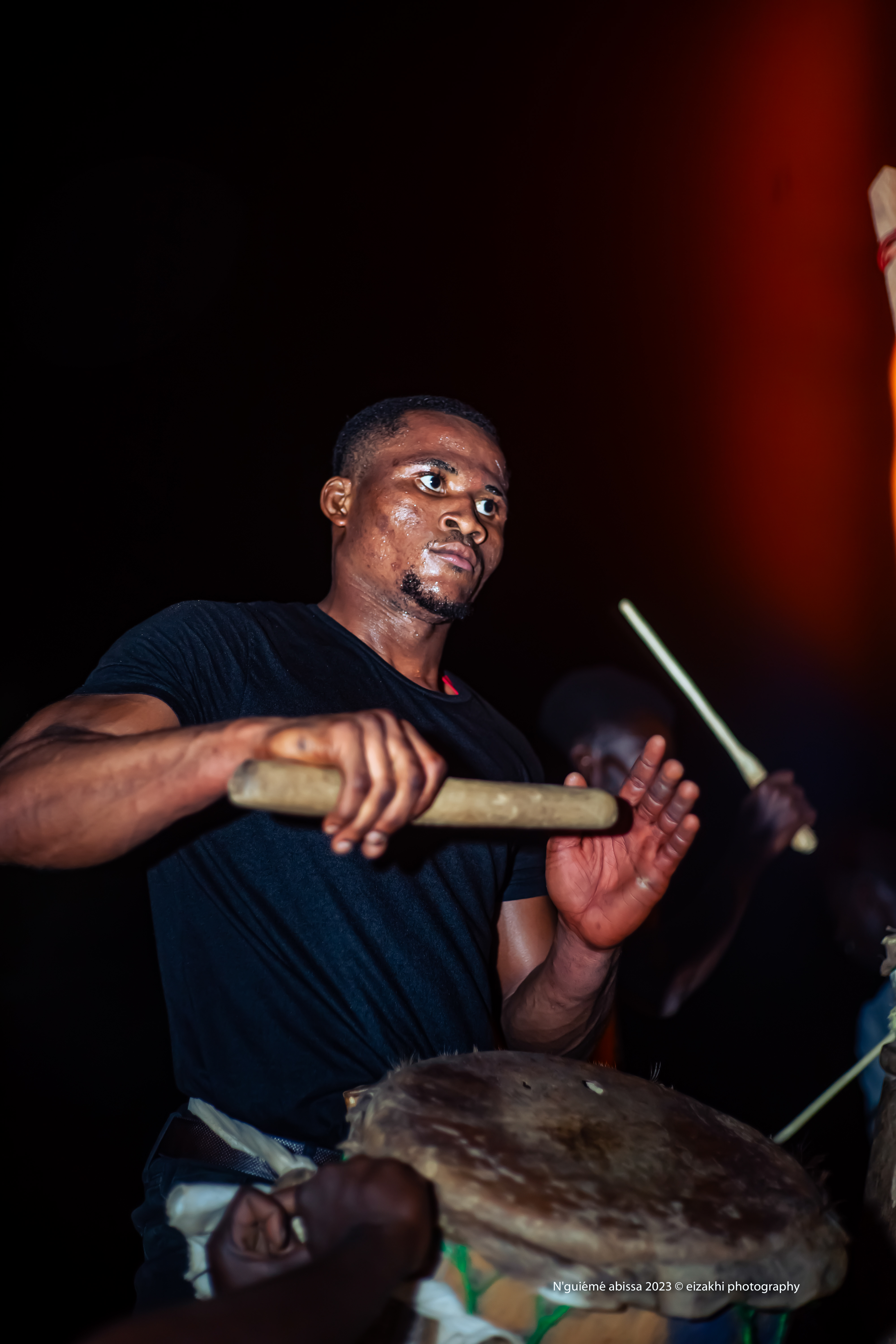
Edogbélé drummers of N'guiémé

== Progression of the festival ==
The festival currently lasts seven days, from Sunday to the following Sunday. The main stages are as follows:

- Day −1: The Siédou, or seclusion of the Edo N'gbolé. This is a period of reflection and preparation in which the king withdraws with the Edo N'gbolé drum, the drum of the Nzema people, in the royal palace. This is followed by the installation of the Edo N'gbolé on the Abissa square and a dance performance under the sign of the Gbabakê instrument.
- Day 2 (Monday): Day of the youth, with a dance performance under the sign of the Abôma instrument, the first female drum of the Abissa.
- Day 3 (Tuesday): Purification of the Edo N'gbolé and the king's first public appearance, followed by a dance symbolizing cohesion between the N'vavilé and Mafolé families.
- Day 4 (Wednesday): Day of the women, followed by a dance symbolizing cohesion between the Ndjua and Ehozilé families under the sign of the Tamalé or Tondoba instrument, the second female drum of the Abissa.
- Day 5 (Thursday): Day of the vital forces, with a dance of peace performed by the Anzawoulé family under the sign of the Epkassoê instrument, the third female drum of the Abissa.
- Day 6 (Friday): Day of the traditional chiefs, marking the entry into the Abissa of the Adawonlin and Alonwomba families, under the sign of the Elawoulé instrument (mambo bell).
- Day 7 (Saturday): Climax of the festival: the entry of the king and queen into the Abissa, the presentation of the seven Nzema families, dances symbolizing cohesion between the families, and the moillet procession ceremony.
- Day 8 (Sunday): The Ewoudolè, a farewell ceremony for the Afantchè, the divinity of forgiveness in the Abissa, and the Bouakèzo, the ritual purification bath of the king; followed by the presentation of wishes to the king and the king's New Year message.

== Religious ceremony ==
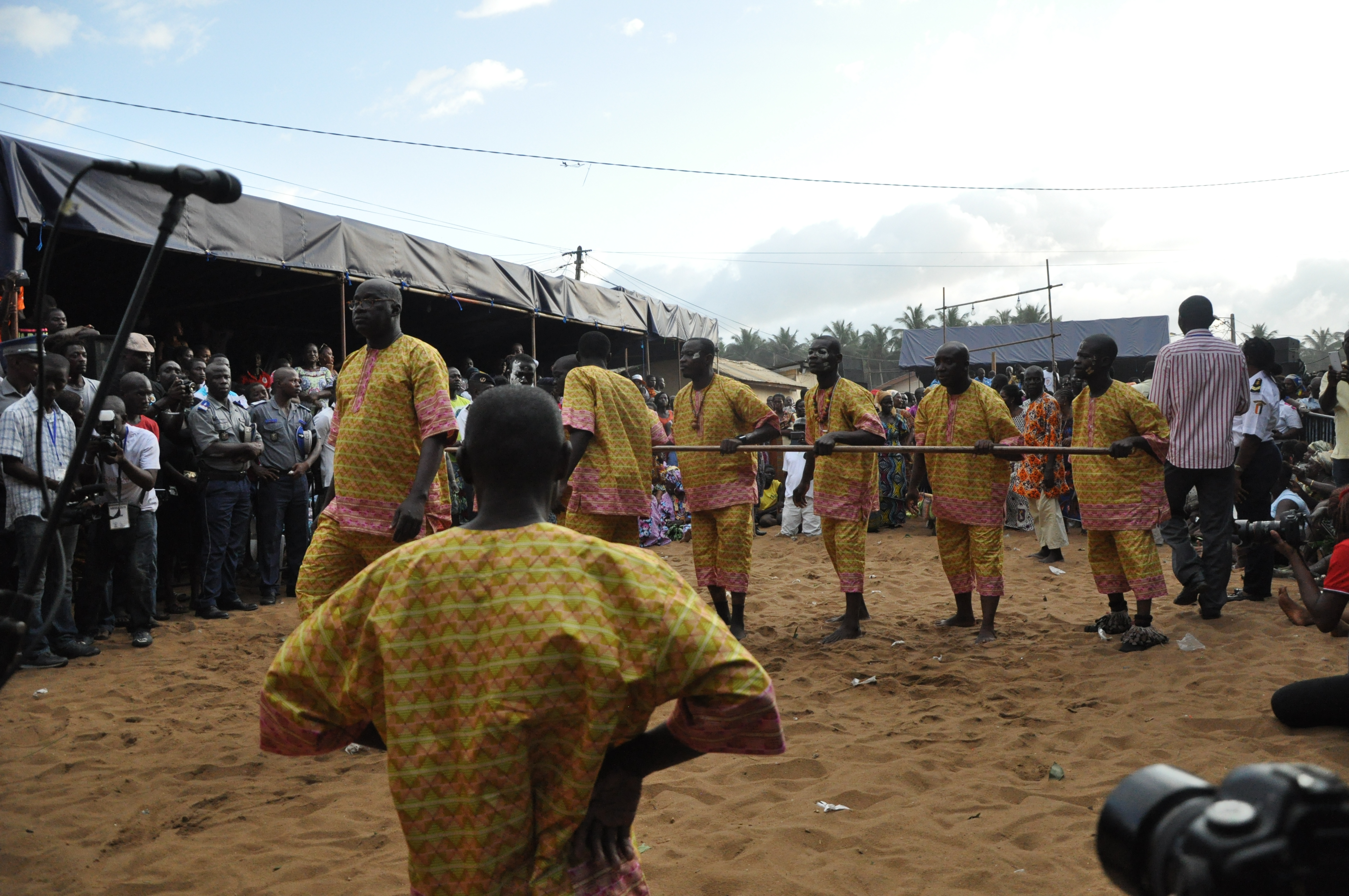
Chansonniers at Abissa.

The Abissa, referred to as Koudoum in its religious aspect, is a sacred dance of purification that lasts one week. It is intended to strengthen the bonds between the living and the dead, as well as to renew the covenant of the Nzema people with Afantchè, the spirit who transmitted this dance to the people.

=== Stages ===
The Koudoum takes place in three stages: the Siédou, the Gouazo, and the Ewoudolé.

==== Siédou ====
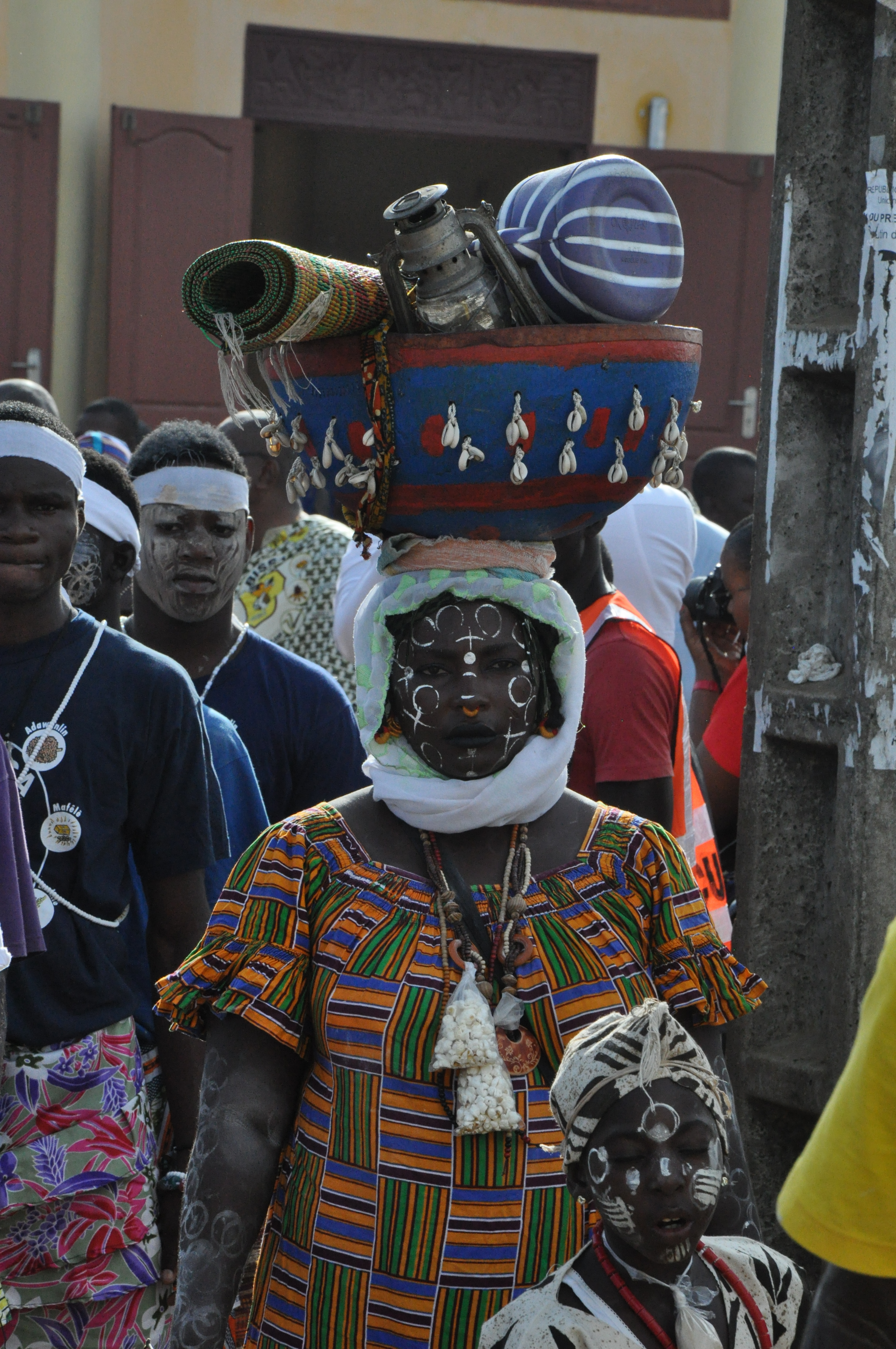
Mambo (son of the king) in traditional attire.

The Siédou, or seclusion of the "Edo N'gbolé" drum, represents the first stage of this event. The Edo N'gbolé is a sacred drum. This stage begins with the strict observance of all taboos. No other drum may be sounded. All fetish priests must refrain from performing any rituals. In the event of a death, the bereaved family must restrain their grief, as funerals are prohibited during this period and burials may not take place until after the festival. Violation of these taboos exposes the offender to punishment by the spirit Afantchè. The Siédou occurs one week before the official start of the Abissa.

==== Gouazo ====
The Gouazo takes place eight days after the Siédou. This stage acknowledges the proprietary rights of the N'Vavilé family over the Abissa, as they are the custodians of the dance. The N'Vavilé family (meaning "spirit of justice"), one of the seven families comprising the Nzema people, is distinguished as the family that discovered the Abissa dance. The elders offer a beverage to this family to seek their permission and blessings for the successful conduct of the festival.

==== Ewoudolé ====
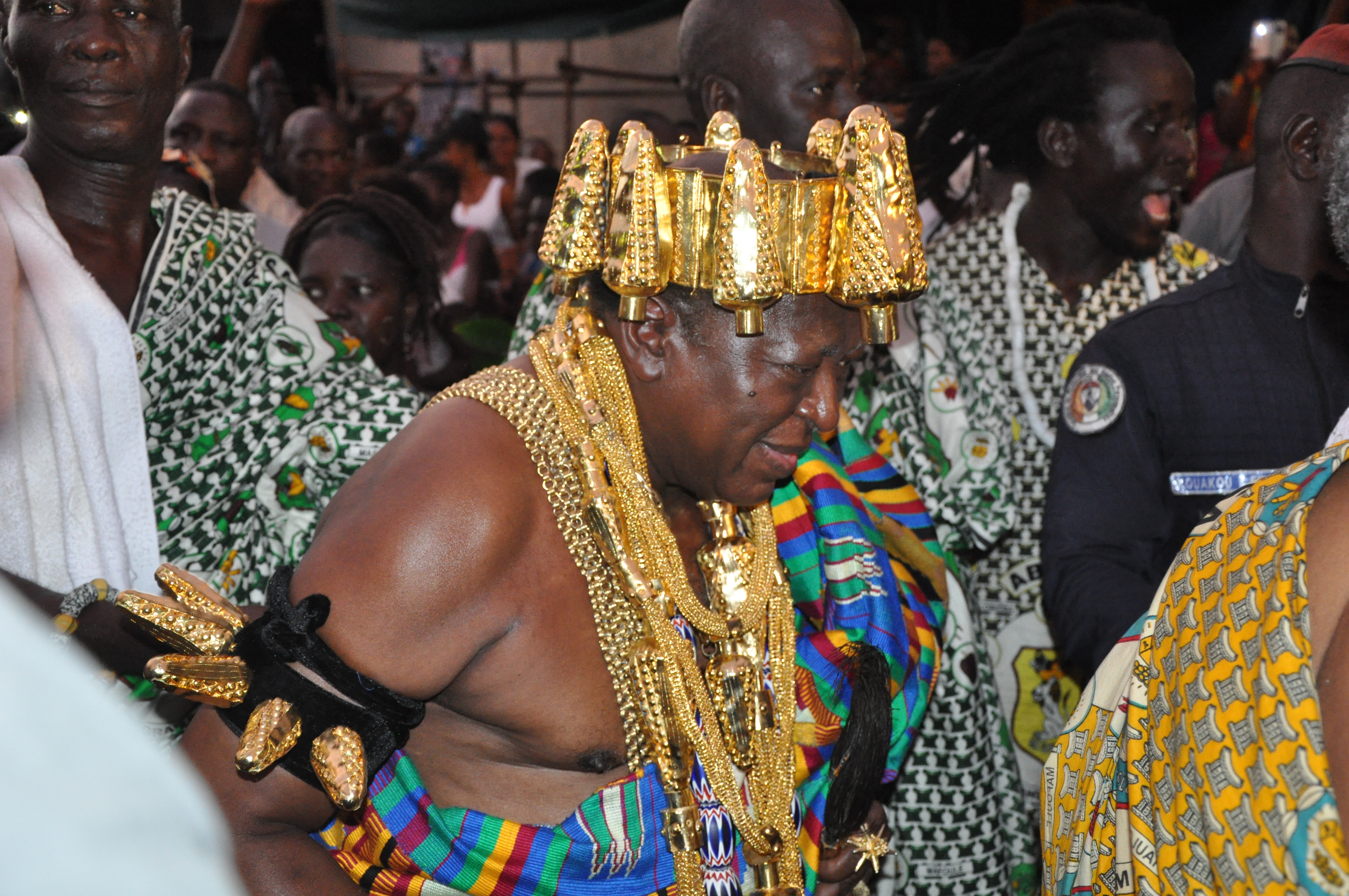
The king of the N'Zima Kotoko of Grand Bassam.

The Ewoudolé marks the climax of the Abissa. It is the stage of great carnivalesque celebration, featuring a variety of disguises, including men in drag and masked individuals who dance to the rhythm of the fanfare. These festivities signal the end of one year and the beginning of another, which, for the Nzema, must occur without any lingering resentment.

=== Tradition of forgiveness ===
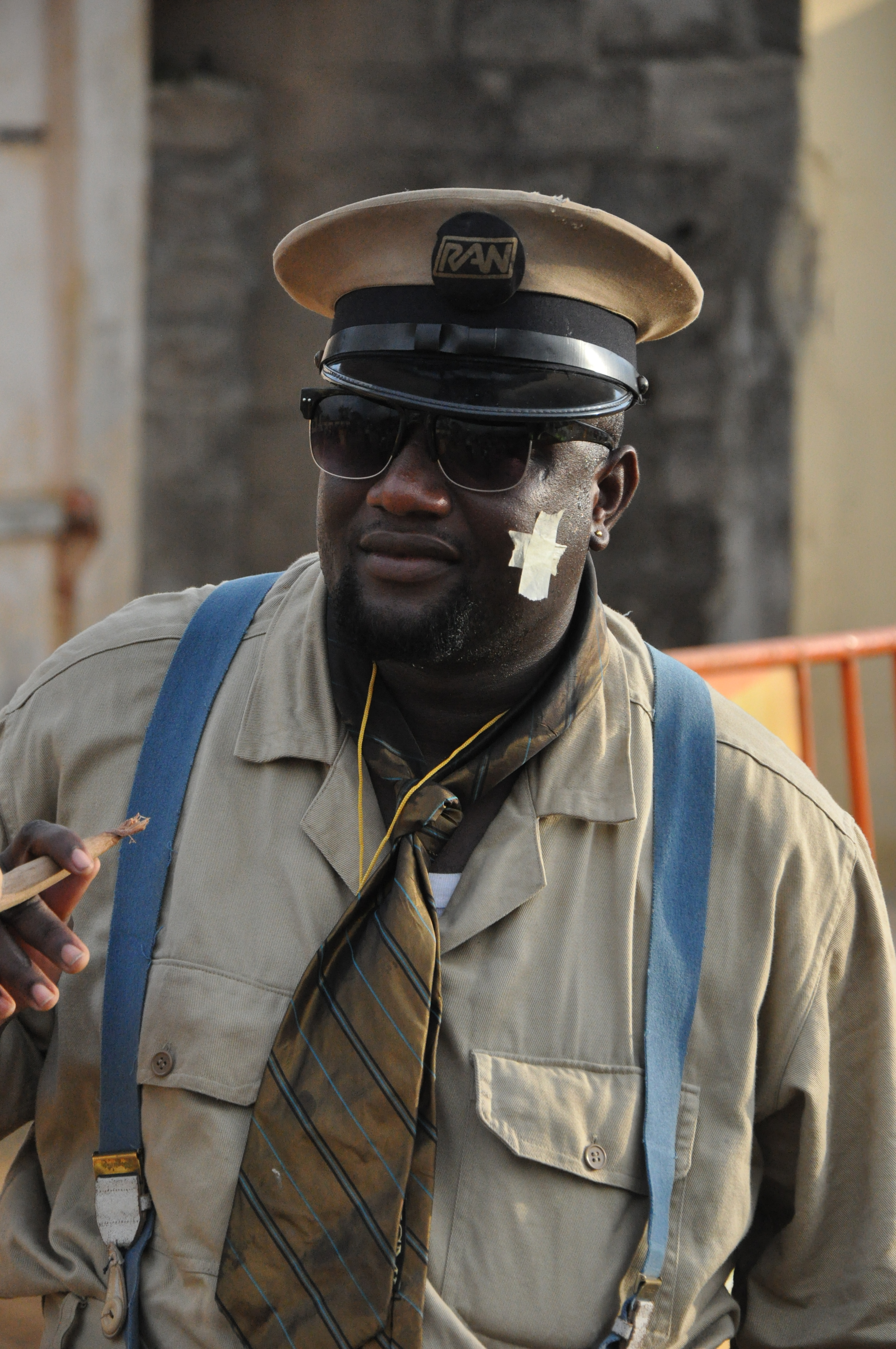
Veteran in disguise at Abissa.

During this period, every individual from one of the seven families—particularly the N'Vavilé, Mafole, Allôwoba, or N'Djaoufo—is expected to rid themselves of all hatred and resentment and to embrace the prevailing atmosphere of joy. The Abissa provides an opportunity for those who have committed serious offenses to publicly repent and obtain forgiveness from the community. Similarly, exemplary members of the Nzema are publicly honored for their good deeds.

The festival is a significant moment for the free expression of grievances without fear of reprisal from the community. Unresolved disputes, problems of political leadership among members of the community, and internal issues affecting communal functioning are all openly addressed, with faults explicitly denounced and the individuals concerned named. Those who are criticized for blameworthy actions are expected to accept the criticism, repent, and offer apologies in order to be forgiven. During this period, the Abissa permits subjects to publicly criticize the king as well, often through songs.

== Editions ==
In 2018, the Abissa, which was scheduled to take place from Sunday, 28 October to Sunday, 11 November, was unable to be held due to electoral violence in the city during the municipal elections.

In 2021, the Abissa was held from 24 October to 7 November under the theme "The Abissa, a crucible of values and hope".

In 2022, the Abissa took place from Sunday, 23 October to Sunday, 6 November. It was placed under the theme "The Abissa in the service of peace and social cohesion".
