= Aby-Mohoua =

- Village
- Location in Ivory Coast
- Coordinates: 5°9′N 3°8′W
- Country: Ivory Coast
- District: Comoé
- Region: Sud-Comoé
- Department: Adiaké
- Sub-prefecture: Etuéboué
- Time zone: UTC+0 (GMT)

Aby-Mohoua is a village in south-eastern Ivory Coast. It is in the sub-prefecture of Etuéboué, Adiaké Department, Sud-Comoé Region, Comoé District.

Aby-Mohoua was a commune until March 2012 under the name Aby-Adjouan-Mohoua, when it became one of 1,126 communes nationwide that were abolished.
