= Abby Lee =

Abby Lee may refer to:

- Abby Lee (born 1972), author of Girl with a One-Track Mind
- Abby Lee Miller (born 1965), American dance instructor and choreographer
- Abbey Lee (born 1987), Australian fashion model, actress and musician
- Abby Lee (politician), member of the Idaho State Senate

== See also ==
- Abby Leigh (born 1948), American artist
- Lee Abbey, Devon, England
- Abby (disambiguation)
- Lee (disambiguation)
