= N'Guiémé =

- Village
- Location in Ivory Coast
- Coordinates: 5°9′N 3°3′W
- Country: Ivory Coast
- District: Comoé
- Region: Sud-Comoé
- Department: Tiapoum
- Sub-prefecture: Tiapoum
- Time zone: UTC+0 (GMT)

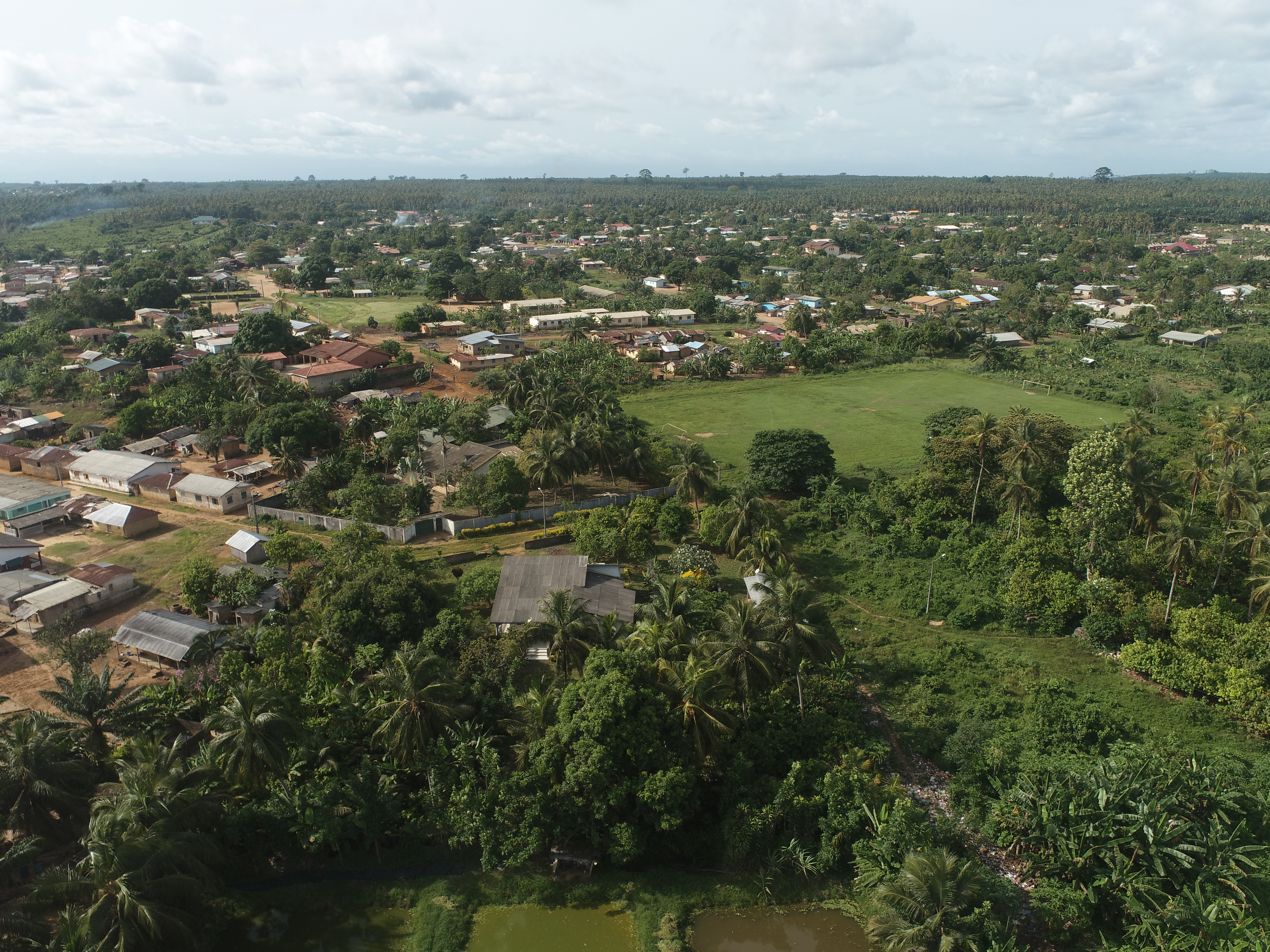

N'Guiémé is a village in south-eastern Ivory Coast. It is in the sub-prefecture of Tiapoum, Tiapoum Department, Sud-Comoé Region, Comoé District. The village sits on the north shore of the Tano River, which in this area forms the border between Ivory Coast and Ghana.

N'Guiémé was a commune until March 2012, when it became one of 1,126 communes nationwide that were abolished.
