= Amadou Koné (writer) =

Ivorian writer

Amadou Koné is a writer from Côte d'Ivoire.

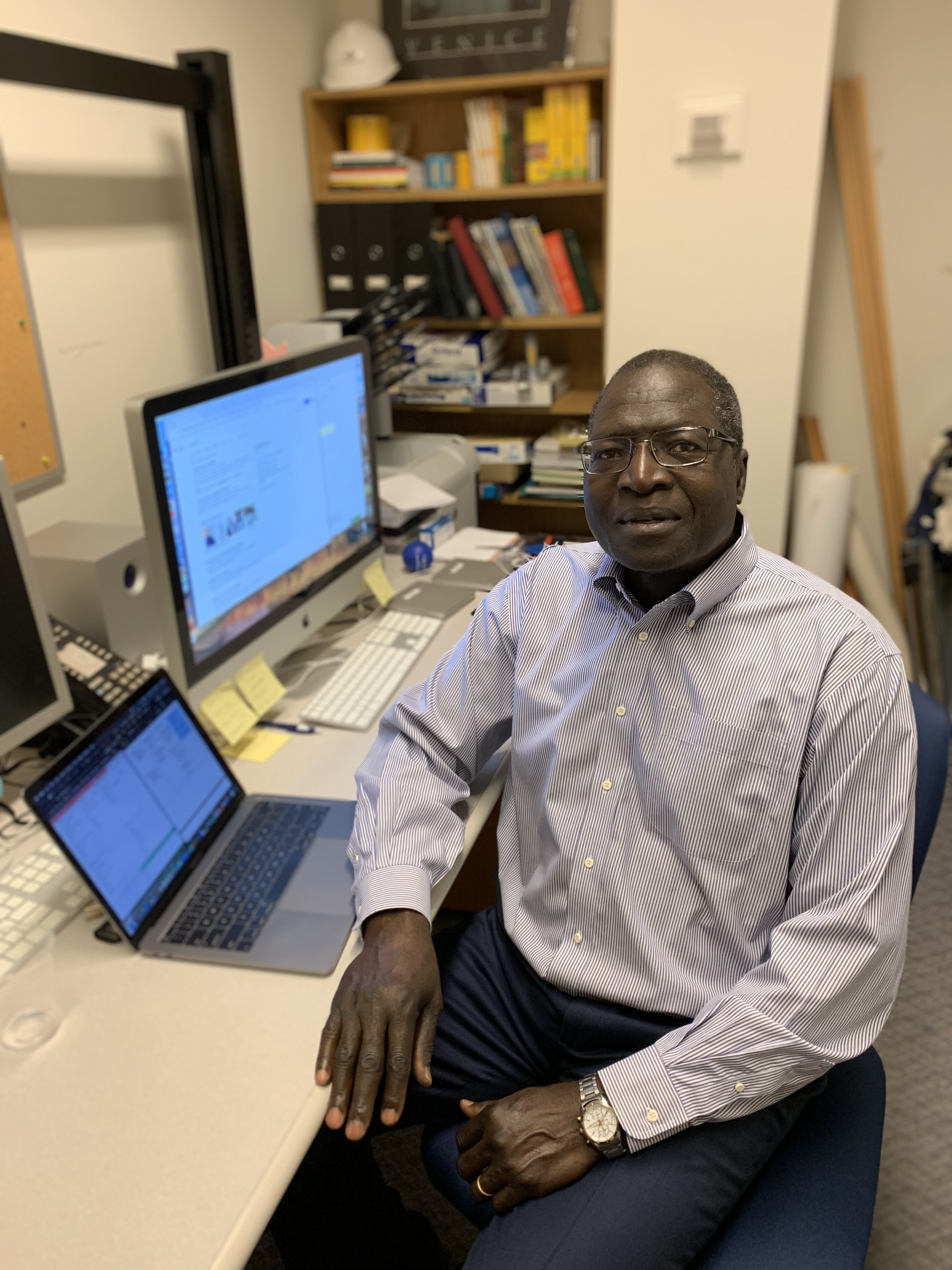
Professor and Writer Amadou Koné

== Childhood ==
He is the son of Soma Denbie (said Mamadou Koné) and Kahou Sirima (known Karidia Koulibali). Amadou Koné was born in May 1953 in the small village of Tangora in the circle of Banfora, today Burkina Faso. Grandson of Dan Kalmo whose big brother, the legendary warlord Fanhikroi, an opponent of colonial rule, was assassinated on the road leading from Banfora to Bobo Dioulasso, Amadou Kone learn very early sense of honor by his father who, exasperated by the abuses of the French settlers and the new leaders in their pay, chose to immigrate to the Ayamé region Basse, Côte d'Ivoire, where he created plantations of coffee and cocoa with his family.

It is Kongodjan, settling near Ayame, Amadou Kone grew up with his brothers and sisters. In his article entitled "Childhood : it was the time of dreams and hope," he describes his childhood as follows: "The year [ my children ] were those of dreams and happiness, intense happiness that even children felt, I think. Africa was victorious. She moved inexorably towards independence. Forced labor was abolished, colonial brutality had ceased in most countries1.

The young Koné’s imagination was shaped by stories of mythical ancestral heroes and modern African figures shared by his father. As Koné recalled: 'My father told me the story of my grandfather, Fanhikroi, and he told me of the honorable men in African history, the saga of the great farmers.'

With the radio that had invaded the African villages, and with the help of his big brother teacher Tiémoko Kone Amadou Kone discovers the political agenda of Africa and its new hero : "In the evening, after dinner, we listened the radio and my brother translated and commented on the news. For me, this news was another story, another epic populated living heroes I heard the voice on the radio. These figures promise a bright future for Africa and there was no reason to doubt their parole1 "

== School and education ==
Amadou Koné was an outstanding school and university courses. From the age of seven, and the insistence of his brother Tiémoko teacher (who insisted that his brothers and half-brothers are in school), he left the idyllic Kongodjan to follow it in all positions. Between 1958 and 1963, Amadou frequent succession of public schools, Aboisso of Yassap, Katiola and finally Akounougbé primary schools. After primary school, he enrolled in the modern school of Grand-Bassam between 1963 and 1968 and second in class at the grammar school in Abidjan where he prepares and succeeded brilliantly bachelor's A Series philosophy in 1971.

The Department of Modern Literature at the National University of Côte d'Ivoire, now University of Cocody that welcomes in September 1971, is still remembered him as a hardworking student. In June 1974, he obtained a degree in modern literature and African Studies option grant for the preparation of a third cycle doctorate in France. His choice fell on the city of Limoges due to Professor Jean-Marie Grassin he had as a professor of comparative literature African mission in Abidjan in his year license a few years ago.

Amadou Koné spent his first year at Limoges in the preparation of a master on the question of authenticity in literature and theater black African. The following year, he enrolled in the DEA François Rabelais University of Tours and the University of Limoges. In its third year, it supports a PhD graduate of the influence of the heroic story of the African novel in French and English under the direction of Jean-Marie Grassin.

While studying at Limoges, Amadou Koné met Mary Lee Martin, an American student whom he married in 1978.

Upon his return to Côte d'Ivoire in October 1977, Amadou Koné is recruited in the Department of Modern Literature at the National University of Côte d'Ivoire as a lecturer. He teaches African literature and the relationship between oral literature and African literature written and French nineteenth-century novel. In 1980, he was included on the list of suitable lecturers professors of African and Malagasy Council for Higher Education (CAM). After defending his doctoral thesis state in Limoges always under the direction of Jean -Marie Grassin, it is on the list of lecturers of CAM in 1988.

In 1990, he left the University of Abidjan for Germany, thanks to a fellowship from the Alexander von Humboldt Foundation. In 1992, he arrived in the United States and began a new career as an associate professor and then full professor of French and Francophone African Studies at Tulane University in New Orleans.

Since 1997, Amadou Koné teaches literature, culture and African history at Georgetown University.

== Research and academic publications ==
The teaching and research of Amadou Koné interested in all areas of literature and African culture (novels, plays, films). He studied the style of some novelists such as Ahmadou Kourouma, Saïdou Bokoum, Cheikh Hamidou Kane. His further research is devoted to genres of African oral literature, heroic tales, epic and initiation, and their influence on the modern novel. His work on the influence of oral tradition on the novel continue to influence African researchers literary studies.

== Research works ==
- Anthology of Ivorian literature, published in collaboration with Gérard D. Lezou and Joseph Mlanhoro, Abidjan, Ceda, 1983.
- Oral narrative novel study on avatars of the heroic tradition in the African novel, Abidjan, Ceda, 1985.
- Oral texts in the modern novel in West Africa, Frankfurt Verlag für Interkulturelle Kommunikation, 1993.
- African lights, new about the African literature and film, New Orleans, University Press of the South, Inc., 1997.
- Creole prospects. Louisiana, Caribbean and Haiti, with prof. Jean -Max Guieu, New Orleans, University Press of New World, 2007.

== Creative work ==
Apart from his career as a professor and researcher, Amadou Koné had a long career as a writer. He is strongly influenced by the context of his childhood.

- Houphouët-Boigny et la crise ivoirienne. KARTHALA Editions. 2003. ISBN 978-2-84586-368-2.
- De la chaire au trône ... Radio-France Internationale. 1975.
- Les coupeurs de têtes: roman. CEDA. 1997. ISBN 978-2-907888-82-0.
- Traités: récit. Nouvelles éditions africaines. 1980. ISBN 978-2-7236-0548-9.
- Les canaris sont vides. Nouvelles Editions Africaines. 1984. ISBN 978-2-7236-0642-4.
- Les frasques d'Ébinto: roman. Ceda. 1980. ISBN 978-2-218-05860-8.
- Sigui, siguila, siguiya: s'absenter pour être enfin là : théâtre. Editions Malaïka. 2006. ISBN 978-2-923284-04-0.

== Sources ==
Pierre Fandio (2009). Amadou Koné: L'écriture ivoirienne entre narration et traditions. Editions L'Harmattan. ISBN 9782296229310.
