= Adaou =

- Town and sub-prefecture
- Location in Ivory Coast
- Coordinates: 5°26′N 3°16′W
- Country: Ivory Coast
- District: Comoé
- Region: Sud-Comoé
- Department: Aboisso

Population (2014)
  - Total: 57,187
- Time zone: UTC+0 (GMT)

Adaou is a town in south-eastern Ivory Coast. It is a sub-prefecture of Aboisso Department in Sud-Comoé Region, Comoé District.

Adaou was a commune until March 2012, when it became one of 1,126 communes nationwide that were abolished. In 2014, the population of the sub-prefecture of Adaou was 57,187.

== Villages ==
The fifteen villages of the sub-prefecture of Adaou and their population in 2014 are:

1. Adaou (6,093)
2. Ahigbé-Koffikro (14,928)
3. Amanikro (2,507)
4. Ayénouan (5,626)
5. Babadougou/Amanikro (1,850)
6. Beniakré (2,867)
7. Diatokro (3,340)
8. Doudoukro (406)
9. Kakoukro-Limite (4,105)
10. N'zikro (7,749)
11. Toumanguié V1 (3,299)
12. Toumanguié V2 (1,251)
13. Toumanguié V3 (833)
14. Toumanguié-Village (1,911)
15. Yapokro (422)
