= Eboue =

Eboue, Eboué, or Éboué may refer to:

- Eboué, Ivory Coast, village in Comoé District, Ivory Coast
- Emmanuel Eboué (born 1983), Ivorian footballer
- Félix Éboué (1884–1944), French administrator
