= Koffikro =

- Village
- Location in Ivory Coast
- Coordinates: 5°24′N 3°23′W
- Country: Ivory Coast
- District: Comoé
- Region: Sud-Comoé
- Department: Aboisso
- Sub-prefecture: Adaou

Population (2014 census)
  - Village: 14,928
- Time zone: UTC+0 (GMT)

Koffikro is a village in south-eastern Ivory Coast. It is in the sub-prefecture of Adaou, Aboisso Department, Sud-Comoé Region, Comoé District.

Until 2012, Koffikro was in the commune of Ahigbé-Koffikro, named after Koffikro and the nearby village of Ahigbé. In March 2012, Ahigbé-Koffikro became one of 1,126 communes nationwide that were abolished.
