= Bonoua =

- Town, sub-prefecture, and commune
- Location in Ivory Coast
- Coordinates: 5°16′N 3°36′W
- Country: Ivory Coast
- District: Comoé
- Region: Sud-Comoé
- Department: Grand-Bassam

Government
  - Mayor: Jean-Paul Amethier

Area
  - Total: 531 km^{2} (205 sq mi)

Population (2021 census)
  - Total: 118,388
  - Density: 223/km^{2} (577/sq mi)
  - Town: 38,135
- (2014 census)
- Time zone: UTC+0 (GMT)

Bonoua is a town in south-eastern Ivory Coast. It is a sub-prefecture and commune of Grand-Bassam Department in Sud-Comoé Region, Comoé District.

In 2021, the population of the sub-prefecture of Bonoua was 118,388.

== Villages ==
The fifteen villages of the sub-prefecture of Bonoua and their population in 2014 were:

- Abrobakro (1 245)
- Adiaho (1 245)
- Adosso (1 111)
- Alohoré (2 653)
- Assé (3 034)
- Assé Mafia (300)
- Bonoua (38 900)
- Hebé (3 102)
- Larabia (2 585)
- Mohamé (2 309)
- Médina (425)
- Samo (6 424)
- Tchintchébé (1 732)
- Wogninkro (907)
- Yaou (4 776)
