= Tiapoum =

- Town, sub-prefecture, and commune
- Location in Ivory Coast
- Coordinates: 5°8′N 3°1′W
- Country: Ivory Coast
- District: Comoé
- Region: Sud-Comoé
- Department: Tiapoum

Population (2014)
  - Total: 25,072
- Time zone: UTC+0 (GMT)

Tiapoum is a town in south-eastern Ivory Coast. It is a sub-prefecture of and the seat of Tiapoum Department in Sud-Comoé Region, Comoé District. Tiapoum is also a commune. The town sits on the north shore of the Tano River, which in this area forms the border between Ivory Coast and Ghana. In 2014, the population of the sub-prefecture of Tiapoum was 25,072.

== Villages ==
The eighteen villages of the sub-prefecture of Tiapoum and their population in 2014 were:

- Allangouanou (838)
- Andjé (377)
- Assué 1 (339)
- Assué 2 (587)
- Assué Gnamboa (332)
- Assué Mossi (1 347)
- Atchimanou (221)
- Bodoua (1 121)
- Eboinda (891)
- Eboko (2 071)
- Edjambo (3 457)
- Famien Eborobo (332)
- Frambo (2 533)
- Kodjokro (766)
- Kouassiblékro (388)
- N'Guiémé (3 795)
- N'zobénou (1 110)
- Tiapoum (4 567)
