= Kouakro =

- Town and sub-prefecture
- Location in Ivory Coast
- Coordinates: 5°27′N 2°54′W
- Country: Ivory Coast
- District: Comoé
- Region: Sud-Comoé
- Department: Aboisso

Population (2014)
  - Total: 30,061
- Time zone: UTC+0 (GMT)

Kouakro is a town in south-eastern Ivory Coast. It is a sub-prefecture of Aboisso Department in Sud-Comoé Region, Comoé District.

Kouakro was a commune until March 2012, when it became one of 1,126 communes nationwide that were abolished.

In 2014, the population of the sub-prefecture of Kouakro was 30,061.

== Villages ==
The ten villages of the sub-prefecture of Kouakro and their population in 2014 are:

1. Aboulié (1,639)
2. Affiénou (6,559)
3. Dadiesso (1,918)
4. Kotoka (3,466)
5. Kouakro (3,090)
6. M'gbasso (1,672)
7. Mouassué (2,616)
8. M'Possa (3,211)
9. Niamienlessa (3,010)
10. Toliesso (2,881)
