= Yaou, Ivory Coast =

Yaou
- Town and sub-prefecture
- Location in Ivory Coast
- Coordinates: 5°48′N 3°8′W
- Country: Ivory Coast
- District: Comoé
- Region: Sud-Comoé
- Department: Aboisso

Population (2014)
  - Total: 19,004
- Time zone: UTC+0 (GMT)

Yaou is a town in southeastern Ivory Coast. It is a sub-prefecture of Aboisso Department in Sud-Comoé Region, Comoé District.

Yaou was a commune until March 2012, when it became one of 1,126 communes nationwide that were abolished. In 2014, the population of the sub-prefecture of Yaou was 19,004.

== Villages ==
The three villages of the sub-prefecture of Yaou and their population in 2014 are:

1. Ebikro-N'dakro (5,374)
2. Sanhoukro (5,916)
3. Yaou (7,714)
