= Bitchy Jones's Diary =

Blog by an anonymous British blogger

Bitchy Jones's Diary is a blog by a British anonymous blogger using the pen name Bitchy Jones. The author writes in detail about her life as a dom, and criticises a variety of aspects of modern sexual mainstream and BDSM culture. She also heavily criticizes women who dominate men for money. Both pen name and the title of the blog are deliberately adapted from Bridget Jones's Diary, which represents the antithesis of the author's view of female sexuality.

One of her recurring themes is the centrality of female desire to female domination.

The blog has received praise from a variety of sources, particularly Abby Lee, with whom the author appeared on the Channel 4 documentary The Sex Blog Girls, and criticism from a variety of other bloggers and websites, many of whose comments appear on the front page of the blog.
