= Ghana–Ivory Coast relations =

- Ghana: Ivory Coast

Ghana–Ivory Coast relations refers to the bilateral relations between Ghana and Ivory Coast. Ghana has an embassy in Abidjan. and a Ivory Coast has an embassy in Accra. Both nations are members of the African Union, ECOWAS and Non-Aligned Movement.

== History ==
Artifacts and remains of the Kintampo Complex (2500 –1500 BCE) have been reported in Ivory Coast. In the Medieval era, Western Ghana and parts of Eastern Ivory Coast was the cradle of the Bono state and Gyaman. Gyaman was conquered into the Ashanti Empire between the 18th and 19th centuries, who exerted power up to the Komoé River. In the 18th century, Queen Poku led a group of Ashanti into Ivory Coast as a result of succession disputes in the Ashanti Empire after the death of Opoku Ware I. The descendants of this populace are the Baoulé people. Gyaman gained independence after the Anglo Ashanti war of 1874 until the state was absorbed into the Wassoulou Empire in 1885, who controlled Northern Ivory Coast. The French Empire incorporated Gyaman into French West Africa in 1897 after successfully conquering the Wassoulou. The entire of Ghana on the other hand was made part of the British Gold Coast by the 20th century.

In the 20th century, both countries suffered from the same ups and downs that characterized Ghana-Togo relations. In early 1984, the PNDC government complained that Ivory Coast was allowing Ghanaian dissidents to use its territory as a base from which to carry out acts of sabotage against Ghana. Ghana also accused Ivory Coast of granting asylum to political agitators wanted for crimes in Ghana. Relations between Ghana and Ivory Coast improved significantly, however, after 1988. In 1989, after fifteen years of no progress, the Ghana-Ivory Coast border redemarcation commission finally agreed on the definition of the 640-kilometer border between the two countries. The PNDC thereafter worked to improve the transportation and communication links with both Ivory Coast and Togo, despite problems with both countries.

By 1992 Ghana's relations with Ivory Coast were relatively good. Hopes for lasting improvement in Ghana's relations with its western neighbor, however, were quickly dashed following some ugly incidents in late 1993 and early 1994. They began on November 1, 1993, with the return of sports fans to Ivory Coast following a championship soccer match in Kumasi, Ghana, that had resulted in the elimination of Ivory Coast from competition. Ghanaian immigrants in Ivory Coast were violently attacked, and as many as forty or more Ghanaians were killed.

Thereafter, scores of other Ghanaians lost their property as they fled for their lives. Some 1,000 homes and businesses were looted. More than 10,000 Ghanaians out of the approximately 1 million living in Ivory Coast were immediately evacuated by the Ghanaian government, and more than 30,000 Ghanaians were reported to have sought refuge in the Ghanaian and other friendly embassies. A twenty-member joint commission (ten from each country) was established to investigate the attacks, to recommend compensation for victims, and to find ways of avoiding similar incidents in the future. In October 1994, the two nations resumed soccer matches after a Togolese delegation helped smooth relations between them.

== Maritime border dispute ==
In 2010, the West African country Ivory Coast petitioned the United Nations to complete the demarcation of the Ivorian maritime boundary with Ghana. This occurred just days after the American exploration firm Vanco discovered oil in the Dzata-1 deepwater-well. The issue attracted considerable media attention, and some Ghanaian press sources claimed that the petition was an attempted oil grab by Ivory Coast. The Ghanaian authorities responded by passing the Ghana Boundary Commission Bill, establishing a commission with the purpose of undertaking negotiations in order to determine the country's land and maritime boundaries. The Boundary Commission held a meeting with Ivorian delegates at the end of April, and the Ivorian delegation was led by Désiré Tagro, the Interior Minister. The two sides did negotiate on the delimitations according to international law. The results of the fourth meeting were not announced, and no meetings have occurred since then. However, the presidents of the two countries did meet at the Presidential Palace in Abidjan on 15 July 2010 and discussed the boundary dispute, amongst other bilateral issues. At the moment, progress appears to be slow, and the nature of the discussions is uncertain.

Both countries have however expressed a desire to peacefully solve the dispute. Both countries had previously submitted routine documents to the UN Commission on the Limits of the Continental Shelf in April–May 2009. Both countries’ submissions mentioned that neither has signed any maritime boundary delimitation agreements with any of its neighbouring states.

Ghana instituted arbitral proceeding under Annex VII of the United Nations Convention on the Law of the Sea 1982 (UNCLOS) against Ivory Coast relating to a dispute regarding maritime boundary in 2014. Both parties subsequently agreed to submit the dispute to a special chamber in the International Tribunal for the Law of the Sea (ITLOS) constituted under Article 15(2) of the Statue of Tribunal contained in Annex VI. The Tribunal, with the agreement of the parties, constituted the Chamber with the following five judges; Bouguetia (President), Wolfrum, Paik, and ad hoc judges, Mensah and Abraham.

Once the Chamber was constituted, Ivory Coast requested for the prescription of provisional measures against Ghana in accordance with Article 290(1) of the UNCLOS. The Chamber, having heard both parties held that it had prima facie jurisdiction over the dispute; and went on to prescribe inter alia, that Ghana should take all necessary steps to ensure that no new drilling takes place in the disputed maritime areas; also in addition, Ghana should take all necessary steps to prevent undisclosed from being used to the detriment of Ivory Coast information on past, ongoing or future activities in the disputed area.

Once the provisional order was delivered, the main proceedings followed. Ghana, the country which instituted the action, based its preliminary basis to delimit the boundary on an equidistance-based single maritime boundary in the territorial sea, EEZ, continental shelf within 200 M, and the same to continue on the same azimuth as the boundary within 200 M to the limit of national jurisdiction. Further, Ghana took the view that the said equidistance-based single maritime boundary is mutually recognized, agreed, and applied by Ivory Coast and there was a ‘tacit agreement’ between parties where the latter was estopped from objecting.

The Special Chamber of the International Tribunal of the Law of the Sea (ITLOS) ruled in favor of Ghana in the three-year-long maritime dispute between the country and Côte d'Ivoire. In a unanimous decision, the Tribunal found that contrary to the claims of the government in Abidjan, Ghana did not violate Côte d'Ivoire's maritime boundary in any way. The Chamber also rejected Côte d'Ivoire's legal argument that Ghana's coastal lines were unstable. At the same time, none of the oil exploration areas indicated in the maps submitted by Ghana were also not compromised in laying the provisional maritime equidistance boundary. Generally, the final boundary, which is an equidistant line, is in favor of Ghana and loses little from their original claim. The Chamber also found that Ghana's oil and gas exploration activities in the disputed basin did not violate Côte d'Ivoire's sovereign rights.

Ghana and Côte d’Ivoire are set to finalise their land boundary reaffirmation by 2025, following the decision of the International Tribunal for the Law of the Sea (ITLOS) on their maritime boundary dispute. At a joint technical meeting on November 5, 2024, Major General Emmanuel Kotia, CEO of the Ghana Boundary Commission, announced plans to implement the tribunal’s ruling through joint maritime patrols and the completion of 150 kilometres of land boundary demarcation. The reaffirmation aims to strengthen diplomatic ties, promote regional stability, and enhance economic opportunities. Both nations have committed to peaceful boundary resolution, reflecting improved relations since the 2014 maritime dispute over oil exploration near Cape Three Points, which Ghana defended based on Côte d’Ivoire’s prior recognition of Ghana’s territorial rights.

== Resident diplomatic missions ==
- Ghana has an embassy in Abidjan.
- Ivory Coast has an embassy in Accra.

== See also ==
- Côte d'Ivoire–Ghana Cocoa Initiative
- Ghana–Ivory Coast border
