= Aaby =

Aaby or Åby may refer to:

- Aaby, Aarhus, a suburb in Denmark
- Nørre Aaby, a town in Denmark
- Åby Racetrack in Mölndal, Sweden
- Åby, Norrköping Municipality, a locality in Östergötland, Sweden
- Åby, Växjö Municipality, a locality in Småland, Sweden

== People with the surname ==
- Gunnar Aaby (1895–1966), Danish footballer
- Peter Aaby (born 1944), Danish scientist

== See also ==
- Aabye
