= Bongo, Ivory Coast =

Bongo
- Town and sub-prefecture
- Location in Ivory Coast
- Coordinates: 5°29′N 3°34′W
- Country: Ivory Coast
- District: Comoé
- Region: Sud-Comoé
- Department: Grand-Bassam

Population (2014)
  - Total: 25,052
- Time zone: UTC+0 (GMT)

Bongo is a town in south-eastern Ivory Coast. It is a sub-prefecture of Grand-Bassam Department in Sud-Comoé Region, Comoé District.

Bongo was a commune until March 2012, when it became one of 1,126 communes nationwide that were abolished. It is in fact a gathering of four different villages. The division is based on the will of the well-known rubber company, SAPH, to set dwelling places for its workers. Among the villages, there are Bongo, which comprises V1, and Bongo-Village (V1 and Bongo-Village form one place), V2, commonly known as Point d'Eau (because of the brook flowing through it), and V3, named G12 (because of its geographic location between the 25 hectares of rubber trees identified as G11 and the other 25 hectares of rubber trees identified as G13). The fourth village is CU (Centre Usine). That name is because the rubber transformation factory is located in this village. CU is commonly known as Dragage.

In 2014, the population of the sub-prefecture of Bongo was 25,052.

== Villages ==
The eight villages of the sub-prefecture of Bongo and their population in 2014 are:

1. Akroaba-Akoudjékoa (2,906)
2. Akroaba-Béniékoa (843)
3. Bongo (4,033)
4. Bongo Saph (5,495)
5. Kimoukro (1,172)
6. Onosalci (5,165)
7. Ono 14 (2,116)
8. Wéhou (3,322)
