= Maféré =

- Town, sub-prefecture, and commune
- Location in Ivory Coast
- Coordinates: 5°25′N 3°2′W
- Country: Ivory Coast
- District: Comoé
- Region: Sud-Comoé
- Department: Aboisso

Population (2014)
  - Total: 34,760
- Time zone: UTC+0 (GMT)

Maféré is a town in south-eastern Ivory Coast. It is a sub-prefecture and commune of Aboisso Department in Sud-Comoé Region, Comoé District. In 2014, the population of the sub-prefecture of Maféré was 34,760.

== Villages ==
The nine villages of the sub-prefecture of Maféré and their population in 2014 are:

1. Ehania V5 (1 868)
2. Ehania V6 (1 577)
3. Ehania V8 (1 037)
4. Kokotilé-Anvo (680)
5. Maféré (13 120)
6. Mouyassué (1 998)
7. Baffia (3 059)
8. Diby (6 570)
9. Koffikro-Afféma (4 851)
