= Aboisso =

- Town, sub-prefecture, and commune
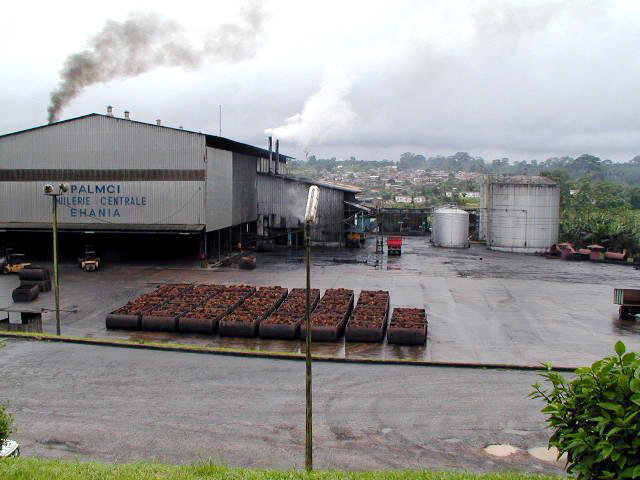
- Palm oil factory in Aboisso

- Location in Ivory Coast
- Coordinates: 5°28′N 3°12′W
- Country: Ivory Coast
- District: Comoé
- Region: Sud-Comoé
- Department: Aboisso

Area
  - Total: 647 km^{2} (250 sq mi)

Population (2021 census)
  - Total: 100,903
  - Density: 156/km^{2} (404/sq mi)
  - Town: 45,688
- (2014 census)
- Time zone: UTC+0 (GMT)

Aboisso is a town in south-eastern Ivory Coast lying on the Soumié River. It is a sub-prefecture of the Aboisso Department for which it is also the seat of government. Aboisso is also a commune as well as the seat of government for the Sud-Comoé Region in Comoé District.

The town's population is primarily composed of the Anyi Sanwi ethnic group, a branch of the Akan people. Once part of the Krindjabo kingdom, the town also served as a staging point for Marcel Treich-Laplène's early explorations of Ivory Coast. The area is served by Aboisso Airport.

== History ==
Aboisso was the seat of the Sud-Comoé region from 1997 to 2011. In 2014, the population of the sub-prefecture of Aboisso was 86,115.

== Villages ==
The eighteen villages of the sub-prefecture of Aboisso and their population in 2014 are:

1. Aboisso (45,688)
2. Assouba (5,802)
3. Ayebo (2,168)
4. Bakro (3,936)
5. Ebokoffikro (519)
6. Eholie (1,759)
7. Koffi Kokorekro (930)
8. Maubert (890)
9. Ningue (1,640)
10. Alliékro (418)
11. Ebakro (304)
12. Ehian (1,193)
13. Ehoussébo (1,015)
14. Epiénou (831)
15. Kodiakro (232)
16. Kohourou (7,037)
17. Krindjabo (6,002)
18. Sanhouman (1,901)
19. Tèmin-Débarcadaire (3,850
