= Noé, Ivory Coast =

Noé
- Town and sub-prefecture
- Location in Ivory Coast
- Coordinates: 5°17′N 2°48′W
- Country: Ivory Coast
- District: Comoé
- Region: Sud-Comoé
- Department: Tiapoum

Population (2014)
  - Total: 27,938
- Time zone: UTC+0 (GMT)

Noé is a town in southeastern Ivory Coast. It is a sub-prefecture of Tiapoum Department in Sud-Comoé Region, Comoé District. One kilometre east of town is a border crossing with Ghana.

Noé was a commune until March 2012, when it became one of 1,126 communes nationwide that were abolished. In 2014, the population of the sub-prefecture of Noé was 27,938.

== Villages ==
The eight villages of the sub-prefecture of Noé and their population in 2014 were:

- Allakro (3,870)
- Ehanian-Tanoé (997)
- Kadja-Gnanzoukro (941)
- Kongodjan-Tanoé (1,315)
- Noé (9,411)
- Nougoua (5,380)
- Saykro (4,782)
- Yao Akakro (1,242)
