= Etuéboué =

- Town and sub-prefecture
- Location in Ivory Coast
- Coordinates: 5°13′N 3°13′W
- Country: Ivory Coast
- District: Comoé
- Region: Sud-Comoé
- Department: Adiaké

Population (2014)
  - Total: 22,569
- Time zone: UTC+0 (GMT)

Etuéboué is a town in south-eastern Ivory Coast. It is a sub-prefecture of Adiaké Department in Sud-Comoé Region, Comoé District.

Etuéboué was a commune until March 2012, when it became one of 1,126 communes nationwide that were abolished. In 2014, the population of the sub-prefecture of Etuéboué was 22,569.

== Villages ==
The eighteen villages of the sub-prefecture of Etuéboué and their population in 2014 are:

1. Abiaty (1,897)
2. Aby-Mohoua (1,402)
3. Adjouan-Mohoua (7,716)
4. Afforénou-Poste (355)
5. Angboudjou (1,020)
6. Akounougbé (3,346)
7. Akpagne-Poste (232)
8. Anzé-Assanou (262)
9. Ebouando 1 (201)
10. Ebouando 2 (387)
11. Egbéi (259)
12. Ehono-Egnanganou (185)
13. Elima (766)
14. Essoukporéty (185)
15. Etuéboué (1,834)
16. Kacoukro-Lagune (263)
17. Man-Man (1,081)
18. M'braty (1,178)
