= Adiaké =

- Town, sub-prefecture, and commune
- Location in Ivory Coast
- Coordinates: 5°17′N 3°18′W
- Country: Ivory Coast
- District: Comoé
- Region: Sud-Comoé
- Department: Adiaké

Area
  - Total: 432 km^{2} (167 sq mi)

Population (2021 census)
  - Total: 50,556
  - Density: 117/km^{2} (303/sq mi)
  - Town: 19,055
- (2014 census)
- Time zone: UTC+0 (GMT)

Adiaké is a town in southeastern Ivory Coast, located on the western shore of Aby Lagoon. It is a sub-prefecture of and the seat of Adiaké Department in Sud-Comoé Region, Comoé District. Adiaké is also a commune.

In 2021, the population of the sub-prefecture of Adiaké was 50,556.

== Villages ==
The 23 villages of the sub-prefecture of Adiaké and their population in 2014 are:

- Aboutou (1 722)
- Adiaké (19 055)
- Anga (972)
- Attiékoi/Ekromiabla (566)
- Bindo-Bégnin (516)
- Ehoussou (437)
- Eplémlan (1 041)
- Gnamiendissou (718)
- Kacoukro (8 081)
- Mauricekro (276)
- Roa (1 091)
- Toumanguié (108)
- Assomlan (1 075)
- Assouankakro (438)
- Bondoukou (1 837)
- Dadiékro (591)
- Djiminikoffikro (2 898)
- Erokouan/Elokouan (316)
- Etuessika (266)
- Kongodjan (893)
- Mélékoukro (922)
- N'galwa (158)
- Petit Paris (280)

== Climate ==
Climate data for Adiaké
Month	Jan	Feb	Mar	Apr	May	Jun	Jul	Aug	Sep	Oct	Nov	Dec	Year
Mean daily maximum °C (°F)	31.5 (88.7)	32.4 (90.3)	32.2 (90.0)	32.1 (89.8)	31.0 (87.8)	28.8 (83.8)	27.8 (82.0)	27.2 (81.0)	28.0 (82.4)	29.6 (85.3)	31.2 (88.2)	31.1 (88.0)	30.2 (86.4)
Daily mean °C (°F)	25.9 (78.6)	27.6 (81.7)	27.8 (82.0)	27.7 (81.9)	27.1 (80.8)	25.7 (78.3)	24.9 (76.8)	24.8 (76.6)	25.1 (77.2)	26.0 (78.8)	26.8 (80.2)	26.5 (79.7)	26.3 (79.3)
Mean daily minimum °C (°F)	21.4 (70.5)	22.5 (72.5)	22.9 (73.2)	23.0 (73.4)	22.7 (72.9)	22.2 (72.0)	21.6 (70.9)	21.4 (70.5)	21.8 (71.2)	22.1 (71.8)	22.2 (72.0)	21.6 (70.9)	22.1 (71.8)
Average precipitation mm (inches)	24.7 (0.97)	68.9 (2.71)	111.4 (4.39)	150.4 (5.92)	287.3 (11.31)	528.2 (20.80)	206.4 (8.13)	69.7 (2.74)	117.0 (4.61)	158.7 (6.25)	140.2 (5.52)	58.9 (2.32)	1,921.8 (75.66)
Mean monthly sunshine hours	194.5	180.4	199.9	198.9	180.6	105.4	97.2	82.6	87.8	148.4	206.1	193.7	1,875.5
Source: NOAA
