= New Town, Ghana =

New Town
- Village
- Location within Ghana
- Coordinates: 5°05′25″N 3°05′55″W
- Country: Ghana
- Region: Western Region
- District: Jomoro District
- Elevation: 125 ft (38.1 m)
- Time zone: GMT
  - Summer (DST): GMT

New Town is a village in the Jomoro district, a district in the Western Region of Ghana, adjacent to the border with Ivory Coast. The major highway that runs through the village is Half Assini - New Town Rd.

== External links and sources ==
- New Town (Ghana)
