= Nouamou =

- Town and sub-prefecture
- Location in Ivory Coast
- Coordinates: 5°11′N 2°54′W
- Country: Ivory Coast
- District: Comoé
- Region: Sud-Comoé
- Department: Tiapoum

Population (2014)
  - Total: 19,148
- Time zone: UTC+0 (GMT)

Nouamou is a town in southeastern Ivory Coast. It is a sub-prefecture of Tiapoum Department in Sud-Comoé Region, Comoé District.

Nouamou was a commune until March 2012, when it became one of 1,126 communes nationwide that were abolished.

In 2014, the population of the sub-prefecture of Nouamou was 19,148.

== Villages ==
The nine villages of the sub-prefecture of Nouamou and their population in 2014 were:

- Attiékro (1,182)
- Bléoulékro (1,386)
- Dohouan (1,391)
- Elokobabo (566)
- Gaoussoukro (4,103)
- Kotouagnoa (4,355)
- Malamakro (3,320)
- Nouamou (2,135)
- Ouessèbo (710)
