= Aboisso Airport =

Airport in Comoé, Ivory Coast

- IATA: ABO; ICAO: DIAO

Summary
- Serves: Aboisso
- Location: Ivory Coast
- Elevation AMSL: 95 ft / 29 m
- Coordinates: 5°27′43″N 3°14′5″W

Map
- Location within the Ivory Coast

Runways
Direction	Length		Surface
Direction	ft	m	Surface
	1,934	590

Aboisso Airport is an airport serving Aboisso in the Ivory Coast. Its ICAO code is DIAO and IATA code is ABO.
