= Adjouan =

- Town and sub-prefecture
- Location in Ivory Coast
- Coordinates: 5°18′N 3°9′W
- Country: Ivory Coast
- District: Comoé
- Region: Sud-Comoé
- Department: Aboisso

Population (2014)
  - Total: 25,088
- Time zone: UTC+0 (GMT)

Adjouan is a town in south-eastern Ivory Coast. It is a sub-prefecture of Aboisso Department in Sud-Comoé Region, Comoé District.

Adjouan was a commune until March 2012, when it became one of 1,126 communes nationwide that were abolished. In 2014, the population of the sub-prefecture of Adjouan was 25,088.

== Villages ==
The twelve villages of the sub-prefecture of Adjouan and their population in 2014 are:

1. Aby (3,318)
2. Adjouan (3,297)
3. Akakro (5,853)
4. Djémissikro (2,713)
5. Eboué (4,086)
6. Ehania V1 (1,142)
7. Ehania V2 (878)
8. Ehania V3 (1,387)
9. Ehania V4 (1,158)
10. Ehania V7 (495)
11. Etubéty (245)
12. Kassikro (516)
