= Bianouan =

- Town and sub-prefecture
- Location in Ivory Coast
- Coordinates: 6°01′N 3°12′W
- Country: Ivory Coast
- District: Comoé
- Region: Sud-Comoé
- Department: Aboisso

Area
  - Total: 543 km^{2} (210 sq mi)

Population (2021 census)
  - Total: 49,647
  - Density: 91.4/km^{2} (237/sq mi)
  - Town: 13,547
- (2014 census)
- Time zone: UTC+0 (GMT)

Bianouan is a town in south-eastern Ivory Coast. It is a sub-prefecture of Aboisso Department in Sud-Comoé Region, Comoé District.

Bianouan was a commune until March 2012, when it became one of 1,126 communes nationwide that were abolished. In 2021, the population of the sub-prefecture of Bianouan was 49,647.

== Villages ==
The seven villages of the sub-prefecture of Bianouan and their population in 2014 are:

1. Appouasso (5,880)
2. Bianouan (13,547)
3. Kétesso (8,264)
4. Kouakoukro (962)
5. Kpélékro (1,381)
6. Songan (9,988)
7. Soubré (1,421)
