= Aabye =

Aabye is a Danish surname. Notable people with this surname include:

- Dag Aabye (born 1941), Norwegian-Canadian endurance runner
- Edgar Aabye (1865–1941), Danish tug of war Olympian
- Finn Aabye (born 1935), Danish film producer
- Jørgen Aabye (1868–1959), Danish painter
- Karen Aabye (1904-1982), Danish writer
- Søren Aabye Kierkegaard (1813–1855), Danish philosopher and theologian
