= Girl with a One-Track Mind =

Blog

Cover of the book version of Girl with a One-Track Mind

Girl with a One-Track Mind is a blog by Abby Lee (pen name of Zoe Margolis, born 14 December 1972), in which the author writes in detail about her life as a sexually active young woman in London. The blog has won praise for its keen psychological insights into male and female sexuality, as well as for the author's earthy humour. It claims over 250,000 readers a month, and won the "Best British or Irish Blog" award at the 2006 and 2007 Bloggies. The author identifies herself as a feminist who, through the blog, wants to counterbalance the existing double standard for male and female sexuality.

== Book ==
In August 2006, Lee published the text of the blog as a book with the same name. It was published by Ebury Press on 3 August 2006 (ISBN 0-09-191240-7) and immediately entered the British best seller lists. In 2007, the book was published in the United States under the title, Diary of a Sex Fiend: Girl with a One Track Mind, and the author was featured in The New Yorker magazine. As of 2009, Lee is working on a second book.

== Identity revealed ==
Soon after the book was published, The Sunday Times published an article which revealed the identity of the author as Zoe Margolis, an assistant director in the film industry. Margolis described the experience as "nightmare", "hell" and "fiasco", writing about how deeply it affected her personal life and caused her to lose her career in the film industry.

After having her anonymity removed, Margolis went into hiding for a while. She chose to present her view in the media giving an interview to The Guardian and writing an article for The Independent in order to balance the tabloid press. Despite losing her anonymity, she continued to write the blog.

== Other writings ==
Since her real identity was revealed, she has continued writing, contributing a story to the Comic Relief book Shaggy Blog Stories, and writing an occasional column under her real name for The Guardian. She has also become an occasional de facto spokeswoman for a variety of anonymous bloggers, and has appeared in the Channel 4 documentary The Sex Blog Girls (2008) with another (anonymous) blogger whose work Lee has discussed - Bitchy Jones, whose writing Lee has recommended or praised on a number of occasions.

== See also ==
- Belle de Jour (writer)
