= Abby (disambiguation) =

Abby is a given name.

Abby may also refer to:

- Abby (film), a 1974 blaxploitation/horror film about a woman possessed by an African demon
- Abby (TV series), a 2003 television series starring Sydney Tamiia Poitier
- Tropical Storm Abby, three tropical cyclones each in the Atlantic Ocean and Western Pacific Ocean
- Andrew Arthur Abbie (1905-1976), Australian anatomist and anthropologist
- ABBY, former book award of the American Booksellers Association, now called the Indies Choice Book Awards
- Abbotsford, British Columbia, Canada
- "The Abby", an episode of television series Dawson's Creek

== See also ==
- Abbey (disambiguation)
- Aby (disambiguation)
- Abi (disambiguation)
- Abby's, an American sitcom television series
