= Grand-Bassam Department =

Coordinates: 5°12′N 3°44′W

Grand-Bassam Department Département de Grand-Bassam
- Department
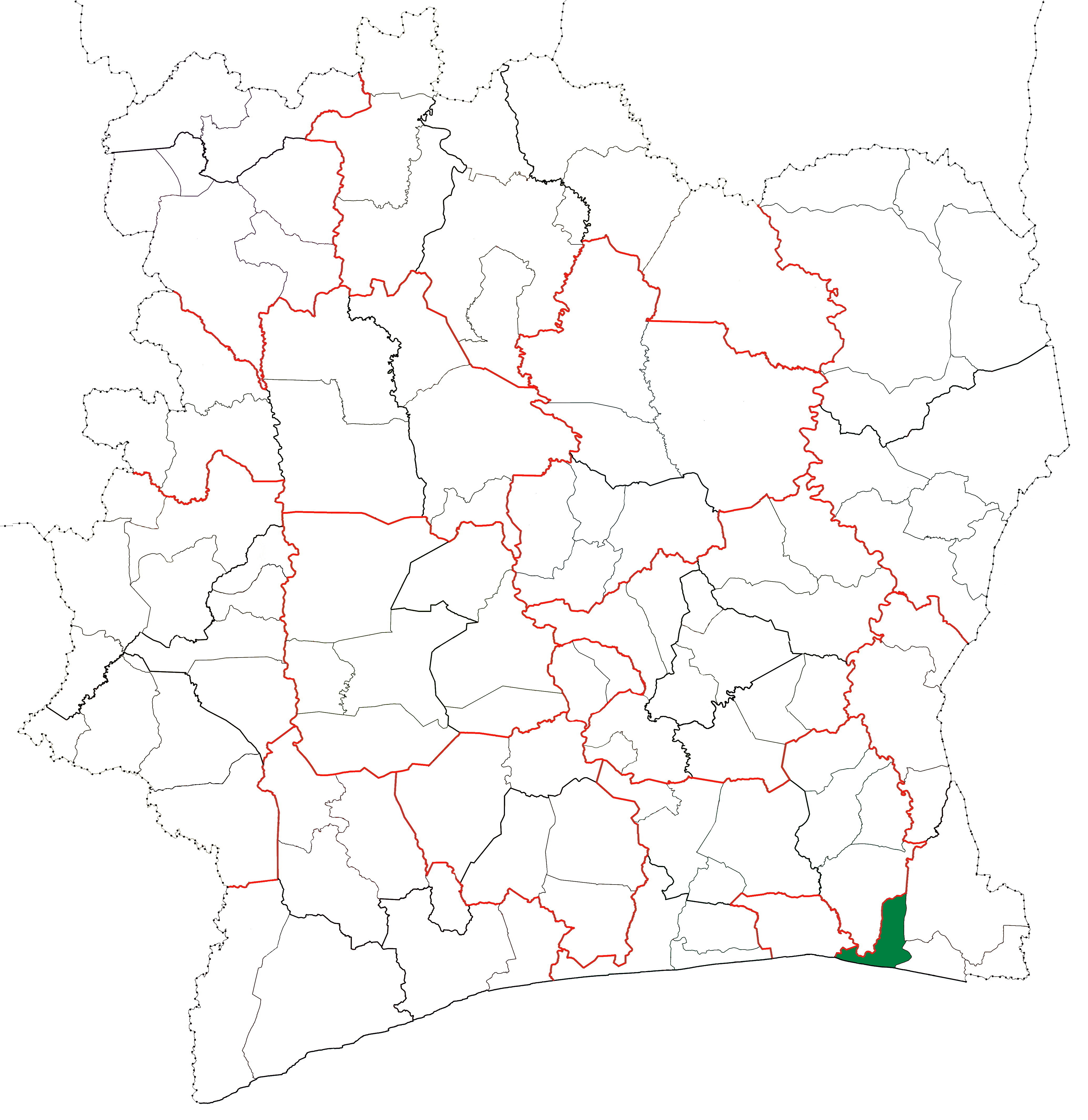
- Location in Ivory Coast. Grand-Bassam Department has retained the same boundaries since its creation in 1998.
- Country: Ivory Coast
- District: Comoé
- Region: Sud-Comoé
- 1998: Established as a second-level subdivision via a division of Aboisso Dept
- 2011: Converted to a third-level subdivision
- Departmental seat: Grand-Bassam

Government
  - Prefect: Djoman Mathias Beudje

Area
  - Total: 958 km^{2} (370 sq mi)

Population (2021 census)
  - Total: 267,103
  - Density: 279/km^{2} (722/sq mi)
- Time zone: UTC+0 (GMT)

Grand-Bassam Department is a department of Sud-Comoé Region in Comoé District, Ivory Coast. In 2021, its population was 267,103 and its seat is the settlement of Grand-Bassam. The sub-prefectures of the department are Bongo, Bonoua, and Grand-Bassam.

== History ==
Grand-Bassam Department was created in 1998 as a second-level subdivision via a split-off from Aboisso Department. At its creation, it was part of Sud-Comoé Region.

In 2011, districts were introduced as new first-level subdivisions of Ivory Coast. At the same time, regions were reorganised and became second-level subdivisions and all departments were converted into third-level subdivisions. At this time, Grand-Bassam Department remained part of the retained Sud-Comoé Region in the new Comoé District.
