= Tiapoum Department =

Coordinates: 5°8′N 3°1′W

Tiapoum Department Département de Tiapoum
- Department
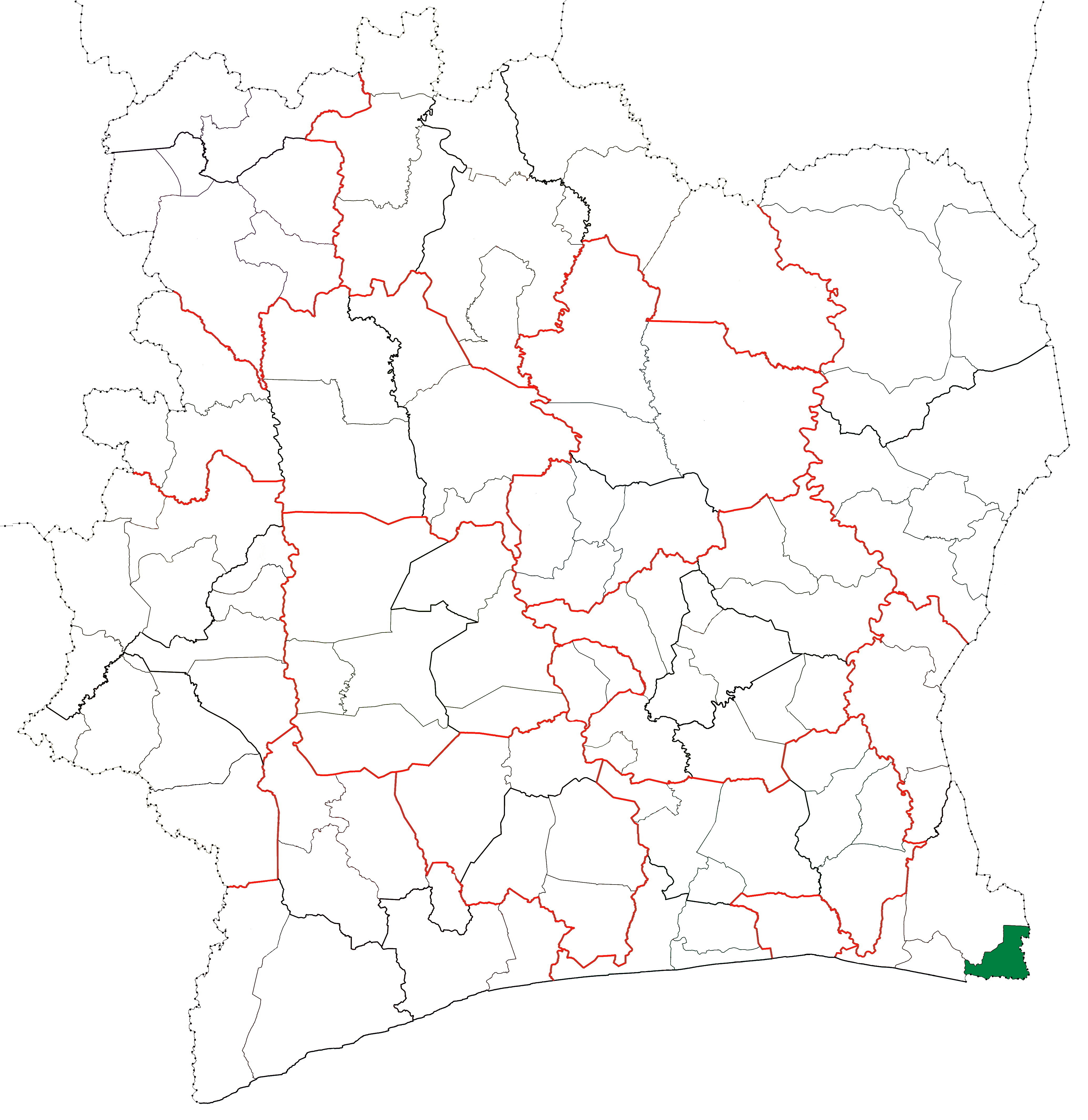
- Location in Ivory Coast. Tiapoum Department has retained the same boundaries since its creation in 2008.
- Country: Ivory Coast
- District: Comoé
- Region: Sud-Comoé
- 2008: Established as a second-level subdivision via a division of Adiaké Dept
- 2011: Converted to a third-level subdivision
- Departmental seat: Tiapoum

Government
  - Prefect: Kassoum Coulibaly

Area
  - Total: 833 km^{2} (322 sq mi)

Population (2021 census)
  - Total: 67,941
  - Density: 81.6/km^{2} (211/sq mi)
- Time zone: UTC+0 (GMT)

Tiapoum Department is a department of Sud-Comoé Region in Comoé District, Ivory Coast. In 2021, its population was 67,941 and its seat is the settlement of Tiapoum. The sub-prefectures of the department are Noé, Nouamou, and Tiapoum.

== History ==
Tiapoum Department was created in 2008 as a second-level subdivision via a split-off from Adiaké Department. At its creation, it was part of Sud-Comoé Region.

In 2011, districts were introduced as new first-level subdivisions of Ivory Coast. At the same time, regions were reorganised and became second-level subdivisions and all departments were converted into third-level subdivisions. At this time, Tiapoum Department remained part of the retained Sud-Comoé Region in the new Comoé District.
