= Adiaké Department =

Coordinates: 5°17′N 3°18′W

Adiaké Department Département d'Adiaké
- Department
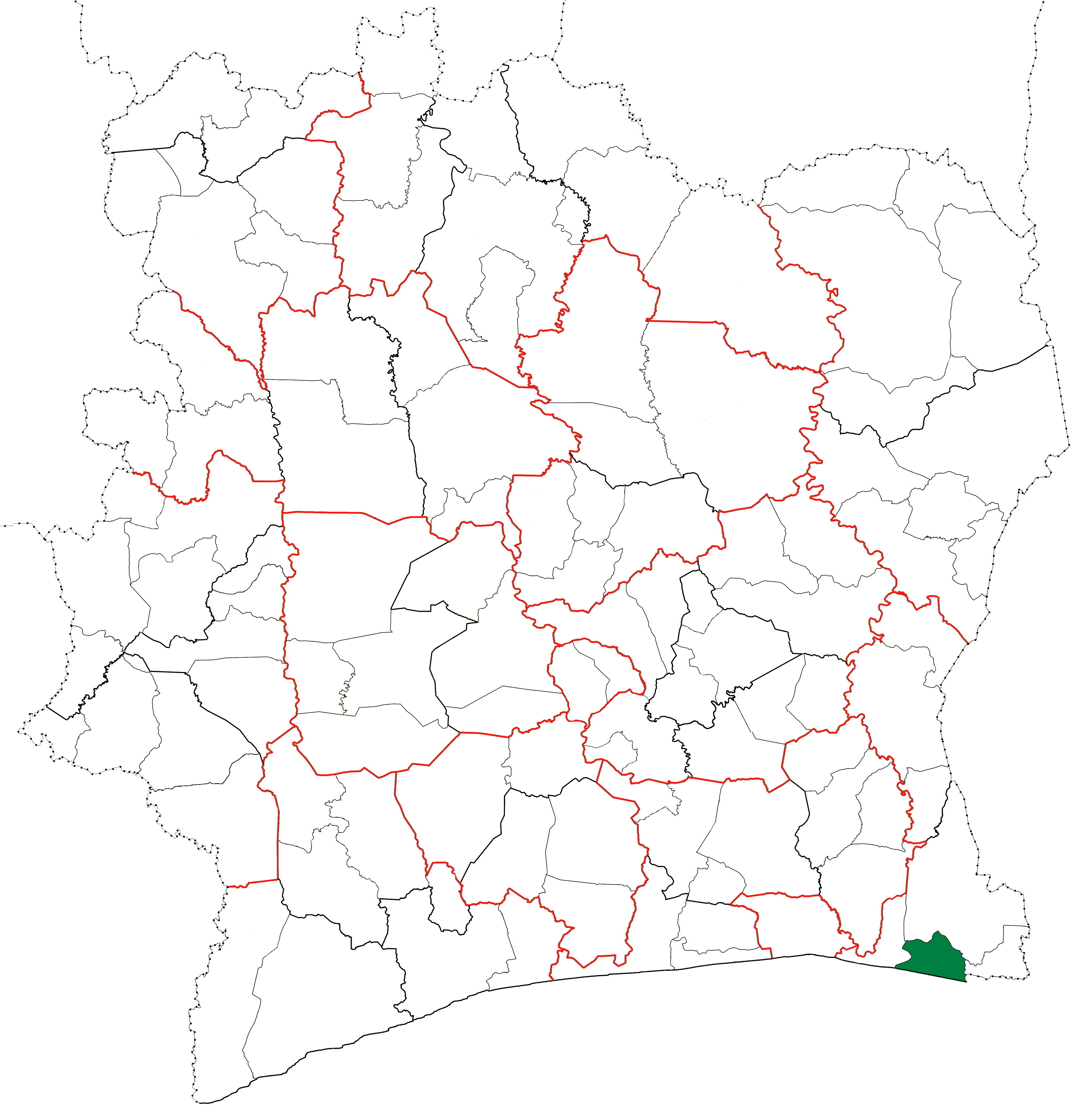
- Location in Ivory Coast. Adiaké Department has had these boundaries since 2008.
- Country: Ivory Coast
- District: Comoé
- Region: Sud-Comoé
- 1998: Established as a second-level subdivision via a division of Aboisso Dept
- 2008: Divided to create Tiapoum Dept
- 2011: Converted to a third-level subdivision
- Departmental seat: Adiaké

Government
  - Prefect: Touré Kanandiénantiori

Area
  - Total: 1,088 km^{2} (420 sq mi)
  - Land: 798 km^{2} (308 sq mi)

Population (2021 census)
  - Total: 88,006
  - Density: 110/km^{2} (286/sq mi)
- Time zone: UTC+0 (GMT)

Adiaké Department is a department of Sud-Comoé Region in Comoé District, Ivory Coast. In 2021, its population was 88,006 and its seat is the settlement of Adiaké. The sub-prefectures of the department are Adiaké, Assinie-Mafia, and Etuéboué.

== History ==
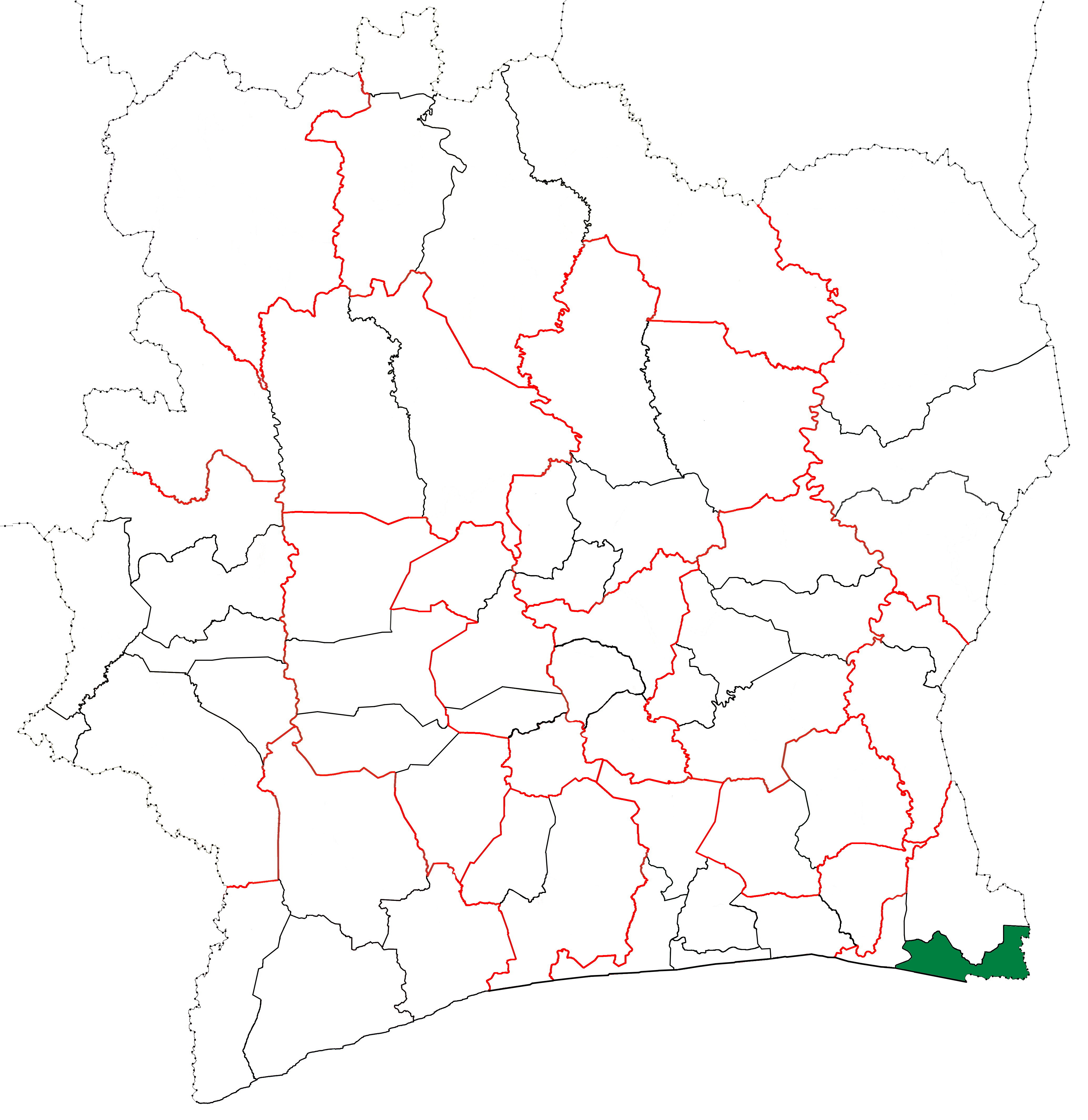
Adiaké Department upon its creation in 1998. It kept these boundaries until 2008, but other subdivision boundary changes began to be made in 2000.

Adiaké Department was created in 1998 as a second-level subdivision via a split-off from Aboisso Department. At its creation, it was part of Sud-Comoé Region.

Adiaké Department was divided in 2008 with the split-off creation of Tiapoum Department.

In 2011, districts were introduced as new first-level subdivisions of Ivory Coast. At the same time, regions were reorganised and became second-level subdivisions and all departments were converted into third-level subdivisions. At this time, Adiaké Department remained part of the retained Sud-Comoé Region in the new Comoé District. In 2014, the population of the sub-prefecture of Adiaké was 44,257.

== Villages ==
The villages of the sub-prefecture of Adiaké and their population in 2014 are:

1. Aboutou (1,722)
2. Adiaké (19,055)
3. Anga (972)
4. Assomlan (1,075)
5. Assouankakro (438)
6. Attiékoi/Ekromiabla (566)
7. Bindo-Bégnin (516)
8. Bondoukou (1,837)
9. Dadiékro (591)
10. Djiminikoffikro (2,898)
11. Ehoussou (437)
12. Eplémlan (1,041)
13. Erokouan/Elokouan (316)
14. Etuessika (266)
15. Gnamiendissou (718)
16. Kacoukro (8,081)
17. Kongodjan (893)
18. Mauricekro (276)
19. Mélékoukro (922)
20. N'galwa (158)
21. Petit Paris (280)
22. Roa (1,091)
23. Toumanguié (108)
