= Aboisso Department =

Coordinates: 5°28′N 3°12′W

Aboisso Department Département d'Aboisso
- Department
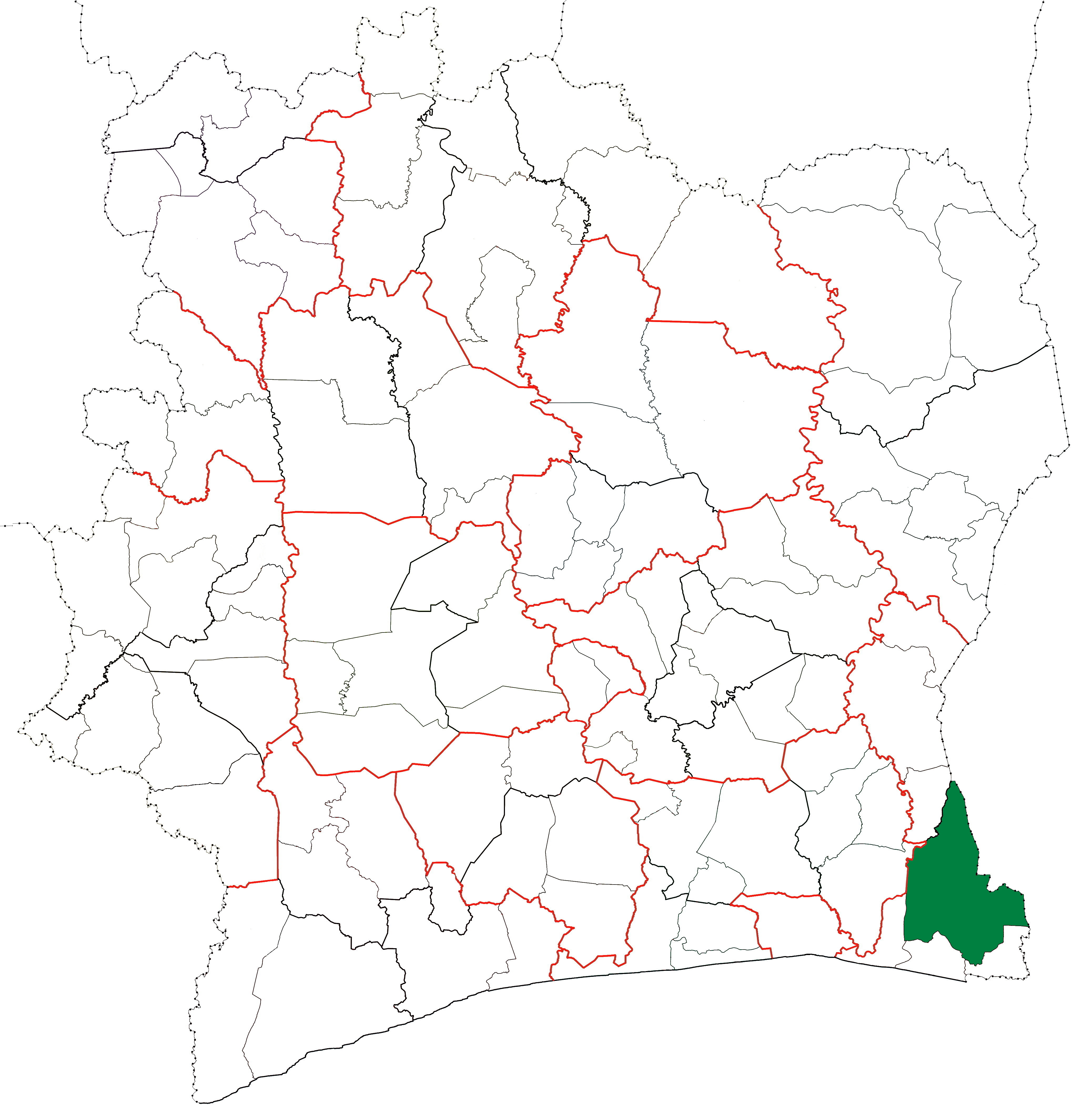
- Location in Ivory Coast. Aboisso Department has had these boundaries since 1998.
- Country: Ivory Coast
- District: Comoé
- Region: Sud-Comoé
- 1969: Established as a first-level subdivision
- 1997: Converted to a second-level subdivision
- 1998: Divided to create Adiaké and Grand-Bassam Depts
- 2011: Converted to a third-level subdivision
- Departmental seat: Aboisso

Government
  - Prefect: Albert Boni Kouassi

Area
  - Total: 4,570 km^{2} (1,760 sq mi)

Population (2021 census)
  - Total: 361,842
  - Density: 79.2/km^{2} (205/sq mi)
- Time zone: UTC+0 (GMT)

Aboisso Department is a department of Sud-Comoé Region in Comoé District, Ivory Coast. In 2021, its population was 361,842 and its seat is the settlement of Aboisso. The sub-prefectures of the department are Aboisso, Adaou, Adjouan, Ayamé, Bianouan, Kouakro, Maféré, and Yaou.

== History ==
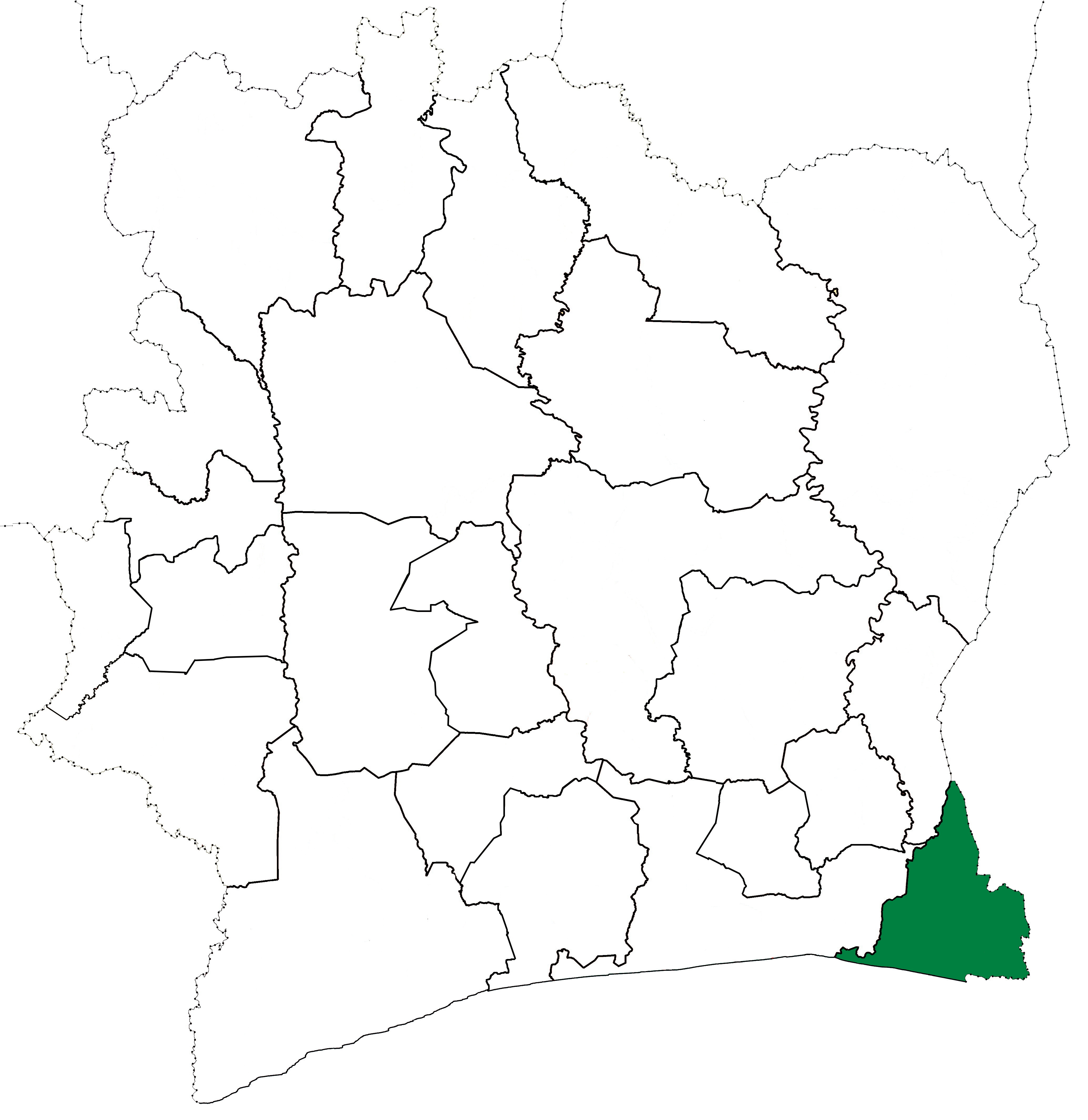
Aboisso Department upon its creation in 1969. It kept these boundaries until 1998, but other departments began to be divided in 1974.

Aboisso Department was created in 1969, as one of the 24 new departments that were created to take the place of the six departments that were being abolished. It was created from territory that was formerly part of Sud Department. Using current boundaries as a reference, the new department occupied all of what today is Sud-Comoé Region.

In 1997, regions were introduced as new first-level subdivisions of Ivory Coast; as a result, all departments were converted into second-level subdivisions. The territory of Aboisso Department was co-extensive with that of the new Sud-Comoé Region, which created a need to divide the department to avoid having completely overlapping first- and second-level subdivision. In 1998, Aboisso Department was split into three parts in order to create Adiaké Department and Grand-Bassam Department.

In 2011, districts were introduced as new first-level subdivisions of Ivory Coast. At the same time, regions were reorganised and became second-level subdivisions and all departments were converted into third-level subdivisions. At this time, Aboisso Department remained part of the retained Sud-Comoé Region in the new Comoé District.
