= Sud-Comoé =

Sud-Comoé Region Région du Sud-Comoé
- Region
- Seal
- Motto: "Silence on développe"
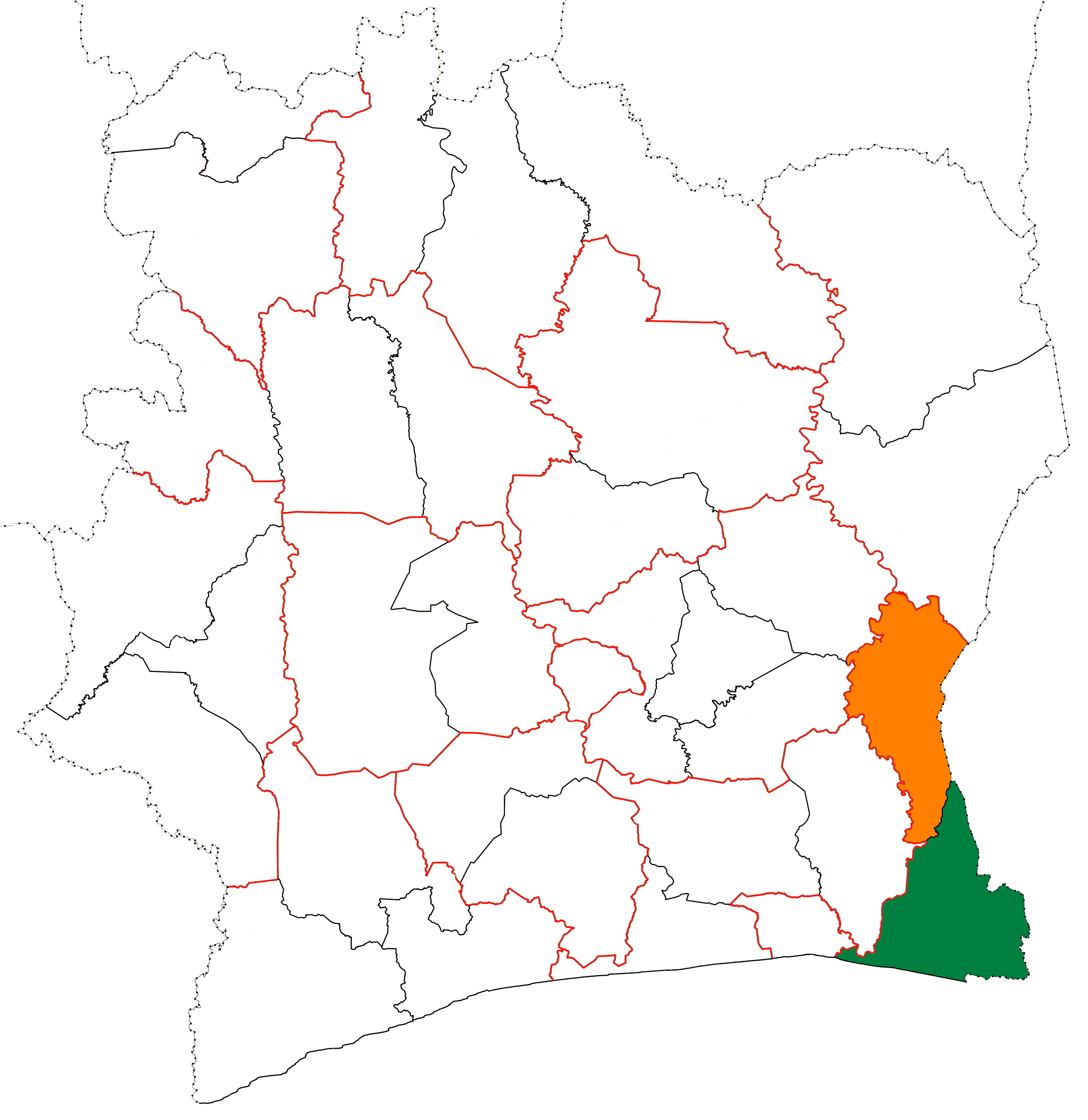
- Location of Sud-Comoé Region (green) in Ivory Coast and in Comoé District
- Coordinates: 5°30′N 3°15′W
- Country: Ivory Coast
- District: Comoé
- 1997: Established as a first-level subdivision
- 2011: Converted to a second-level subdivision
- Regional seat: Aboisso

Government
  - Prefect: Albert Boni Kouassi
  - Council President: Aka Aouélé

Area
  - Total: 7,240 km^{2} (2,800 sq mi)

Population (2021 census)
  - Total: 784,893
  - Density: 108/km^{2} (281/sq mi)
- Time zone: UTC+0 (GMT)

Sud-Comoé Region is one of the 31 regions of Ivory Coast. Since 2011, it has been one of two regions in Comoé District. The region's seat is Aboisso. The region's area is 7,240 km^{2}, and its population in the 2021 census was 784,893.

== History ==
The territory of the region is virtually co-extensive with the territory of the pre-colonial kingdom of Sanwi, which as late as 1969 attempted to break away from Ivory Coast and form an independent state. Since 2002, the King of Sanwi has been Nana Amon Ndoufou V.

Sud-Comoé Region was established in 1997 as a first-level administrative region. As part of the 2011 administrative reorganisation of the subdivisions of Ivory Coast, Sud-Comoé was converted into a second-level division with no territorial changes. It was combined with Indénié-Djuablin to form the new first-level Comoé District.

== Departments ==
Sud-Comoé Region is currently divided into four departments: Aboisso, Adiaké, Grand-Bassam, and Tiapoum.
