= Keli =

Keli or KELI may refer to:

== Callsigns ==
- KELI (FM), a radio station (98.7 FM) licensed to San Angelo, Texas, United States
- KTBZ (AM), a radio station (1430 AM) in Tulsa, Oklahoma, United States that previously held the call sign

== Places ==
- Kelli, Drama, a former village in Greece
- Keli Highland, Georgia; a volcanic highland
- Keli Lake, Akhalgori, Mtskheta-Mtianeti, Georgia; a volcanic glacial lake

== People ==
=== Given name ===
- Ren Keli (任克礼; born 1936), Chinese politician
- Miao Ke-li (苗可麗; born 1971), Taiwanese actress and singer
- Liao Keli (廖克力; born 1990), Chinese para-table-tennis player
- Gao Keli (12th century), a Chinese rebel during the Song dynasty
- Fang Keli (方克立; 1938–2020), Chinese communist and New Confucianist scholar
- Keli Carender (born 1981), American blogger and Tea Party activist
- Keli Corpse (born 1974), Canadian ice hockey player
- Keli Goff (born 1979), American writer
- Keli Lane (born 1975), Australian water polo player convicted of murdering her own baby
- Keli McGregor (1963–2010), American sportsman
- Keli Neemia, head of government of Tokelau, a dependent territory of New Zealand from 1994 to 1995
- Keli Nicole Price (born 1979), American singer-songwriter
- Keli Smith Puzo (born 1979), American field hockey player
- Keli Walubita (born 1943), the Minister of Foreign Affairs for Zambia

=== Surname ===
- Tynisha Keli (born 1985), American singer-songwriter

== Fictional characters ==
- Princess Keli, from the 1987 Terry Pratchett fantasy novel Mort
- Keli Quintela, a DC Comics character

== Other uses ==
- List of storms named Keli
- Keli (film), a 1991 Indian Malayalam drama film directed by Bharathan

== See also ==
- Ke Li (disambiguation)
- Kelli (disambiguation)
- Kelly (disambiguation)
- Kelley (disambiguation)
- Kellie (disambiguation)
- Kellee
