= Kelly =

Kelly may refer to:

== Art and entertainment ==
- Kelly (Kelly Price album), 2011
- Kelly (Andrea Faustini album)
- Kelly (musical), by Mark Charlap, 1965
- "Kelly" (song), by Kelly Rowland, 2018
- Kelly (film), Canada, 1981
- Kelly (Australian TV series)
- Kelly (talk show), Northern Ireland
- The Kelly Family, a music group
- Kelly Kelly (TV series), US, 1998
- "Kelly", a 2019 single by Peakboy
- Kelly West/Zelena, a character on Once Upon a Time
- Kelly (The Walking Dead), a character
- Kelly (musician), a character portrayed by Liam Kyle Sullivan

== People ==
- Kelly (given name)
- Kelly (surname)
- Clan Kelly, a Scottish clan
- Kelly (murder victim)
- Kelly (footballer, born 1975), Clesly Evandro Guimarães, Brazilian
- Kelly (footballer, born 1985), Kelly Cristina Pereira da Silva, Brazilian
- Kelly (footballer, born 1987), Kelly Rodrigues Santana Costa, Brazilian

== Places ==
=== Australia ===
- Kelly, South Australia, a locality
- Kelly Basin, Tasmania
- Hundred of Kelly, a cadastral unit in South Australia

=== Azerbaijan ===
- Kollu, Dashkasan

=== Trinidad and Tobago ===
- Kelly Village, Caroni County, Tunapuna-Piarco

=== United Kingdom ===
- Kelly, Devon
- Kelly Bray, Cornwall

=== United States ===
- Kelly, Kansas
- Kelly, Kentucky
- Kelly, Louisiana
- Kelly, North Carolina
- Kelly, Texas
- Kelly, West Virginia
- Kelly, North Dakota
- Kelly, Wisconsin, a town
- Kelly, Juneau County, Wisconsin, an unincorporated community
- Kelly, Wyoming
- Kelly Field, formerly Kelly Air Force Base, San Antonio, Texas
- Kelly Ridge, California, a CDP
- Kelly Township, Union County, Pennsylvania

== Other ==
- Kelly criterion for sizing a bet
- Kelly drive, part of a drilling rig
  - kelly hose, a flexible hose that connects the standpipe to the kelly drive
- Kelly (gas storage), a seamless transportable compressed gas container, often manifolded in groups

== See also ==
- Earl of Kellie, title of Scottish peers
- Kellee
- Keeley (disambiguation)
- Keely, a surname
- KELI (disambiguation)
- Kelley (disambiguation)
- Kelli (disambiguation)
- Kellie (disambiguation)
- Kellyville (disambiguation)
