= Kelley =

Kelley may refer to:

- Kelley (name), a given name and surname

== Places ==
=== United States ===
- Kelley, Iowa
- Kelley Hill in Fort Benning, Georgia
- Kelley Park, in San Jose, California
- Kelley Square, in Worcester, Massachusetts
- Kelley Township, Ripley County, Missouri
- Kelleys Island, Ohio
- Kelleytown, Georgia

=== Antarctica ===
- Kelley Massif
- Kelley Nunatak
- Kelley Peak (Antarctica)
- Kelley Spur

=== Other ===
- Kelley Barracks, in Stuttgart-Möhringen, Germany
- Kelleys Cove, Nova Scotia, in Canada

== Schools ==
- Bishop Kelley Catholic School, in Lapeer, Michigan
- Bishop Kelley High School, in Tulsa, Oklahoma
- Kelley School of Business, of Indiana University

== Structures ==
- Harry W. Kelley Memorial Bridge, in Maryland
- Kelley and Browne Flats, in St. Joseph, Missouri
- Kelley House (disambiguation), various locations

== Other uses ==
- Kelley Blue Book, for used automobile prices
- Kelley Branch, a watercourse in Missouri
- Kelley Stand Road, in Vermont
- Kelley-Roosevelts Asiatic Expedition, of 1928–1929
- USNS Sgt. Jonah E. Kelley, a former auxiliary support vessel of the U.S. Navy

== See also ==
- Kellee
- Kelly (disambiguation)
- Kellie (disambiguation)
- Kelli (disambiguation)
- KELI (disambiguation)
