= Kelley (name) =

Kelley is a variant of the Irish surname Kelly.

== People with the surname ==
- Abby Kelley (1811–1887), Quaker abolitionist and social reformer; mentor of Susan B. Anthony
- Alfred Kelley (1789–1859), American lawyer, canal builder, railroad magnate, and legislator
- Alton Kelley, American artist
- Ann Kelley (writer), British writer
- Ann E. Kelley, American neurosurgeon (1954–2007), American neuroscientist
- Augustine B. Kelley (1883–1957), US Congressman from Pennsylvania, grandfather of Sheila Kelly
- Brenden Kelley, American politician
- Brian Kelley (born 1985), American musician
- Brian Kelley (American football) (born 1951), American football player
- Brian Kelley (CIA officer) (1943-2011), American CIA officer
- Brian Kelley (writer), American television writer
- Charles Kelley, musician
- Christine Kelley, American mathematician
- Clarence M. Kelley (1911–1977)
- Cole Kelley (born 1997), American football player
- David Kelley (philosopher) (born 1949), American objectivist philosopher
- David E. Kelley (born 1956), American television writer and producer
- Dean M. Kelley (1927–1977), American author and religious freedom advocate
- DeForest Kelley (1920–1999), actor, famous for Star Trek
- Devin Kelley (born 1986), American actress
- Donald E. Kelley (1908–1995), associate justice of the Colorado Supreme Court
- Douglas Kelley (1912–1958), American psychiatrist at the Nuremberg War Trials
- Edward Kelley (1555–1597), alchemist and spirit medium, possible creator of Enochian
- Florence Kelley (1859–1932), social/consumer safety/civil rights activist
- Francis Kelley (1870–1948), American Roman Catholic Bishop
- Frederick M. Kelley (1822–1905), American banker and engineer
- Geoffrey Kelley (born 1955), Canadian politician
- Harold Kelley, psychologist
- Harold Kelley (rugby league), Australian rugby league footballer
- Homer Kelley (1907–1983), American golf instructor
- Honora Kelley (1857–1938), American serial killer
- Horace Kelley (1819–1890), American businessman and co-founder of the Cleveland Museum of Art
- Ike Kelley (born 1944), American football player
- Jack Kelley (journalist), disgraced American journalist
- Jacquelyn Kelley (1926–1988), All-American Girls Professional Baseball League
- Jill Kelley (born 1975), American socialite and volunteer military liaison
- Joseph James Kelley (1871–1943), American baseball player
- John L. Kelley (1916–1999), mathematician
- Johnny Kelley (1907–2004), American long-distance runner
- Josh Kelley, singer/songwriter
- Joshua Kelley (born 1997), American football player
- Ken Kelley (American football) (born 1960), American football player
- Ken Kelley (journalist) (1949–2008), American journalist and publisher
- Kenneth Keith Kelley (1901–1991), American chemist
- Kevin Kelley (boxer)
- Kevin Daniel Kelley, American drummer with The Byrds
- Kitty Kelley (born 1942), American journalist and author
- Lee Charles Kelley (born 1951), American mystery novelist and dog trainer
- Liam Kelley (historian) (born 1966), American historian specialised in Vietnam
- Mike Kelley (artist) (1954–2012), American artist
- Mike Kelley (baseball) (1875–1955), American baseball player and manager in the minor leagues
- Mike Kelley (American football), American football quarterback for San Diego Chargers
- Mikey Kelley (born 1973), American voice actor
- Oliver Hudson Kelley (1826–1913)
- Paul X. Kelley (1928–2019), 28th Commandant of the U.S. Marine Corps
- Paula Kelley (born 1971), American indie singer-songwriter
- Peter Kelley (born 1974), American weightlifter
- Robert Kelley (American football) (born 1992), American football running back
- Ruth Kelley, American flight attendant
- Shawn Kelley (born 1984), American baseball player
- Sheila Kelley (American actress), actress, founder of S-Factor, granddaughter of senator Augustine B. Kelley
- Thomas P. Kelley (1905–1982), Canadian author
- Trevor Kelley (born 1993), American baseball player
- Vince Kelley (born 1962), American/Australian basketball player
- William Kelley (baseball) (born 1875), American baseball player
- William Kelley (screenwriter) (1929–2003), American screenwriter and producer
- William B. Kelley (1942–2015), American lawyer and gay activist
- William D. Kelley (1814–1890), American politician
- William Donald Kelley (1925–2005), American alternative medicine therapist
- William K. Kelley, American law professor
- William Melvin Kelley (1937–2017), American novelist
- William Nimmons Kelley (born 1939), American physician

== As first name ==
- Kelley Abbey (born 1966), Australian actress
- Kelley Armstrong (born 1968), Canadian author
- Kelley Bowman (born 1983), American high jumper
- Kelley Eckels Currie, American lawyer and government official
- Kelley Deal (born 1961), American musician
- Kelley Hurley (born 1988), American fencer
- Kelley Jakle (born 1989), American actress
- Kelley Johnson (born 1992), American pageant competitor
- Kelley Johnson (footballer) (born 1992), Puerto Rican footballer
- Kelley Jones (born 1962), American comics artist
- Kelley Linck (born 1963), American politician
- Kelley Lovelace, American songwriter
- Kelley Earnhardt Miller (born 1972), American businesswoman
- Kelley O'Hara (born 1988), American soccer player
- Kelley Paul (born 1963), American politician
- Kelley Puckett, American comic book writer
- Kelley Stoltz (born 1971), American musician
- Kelley Tully, American politician
- Kelley Washington (born 1979), American football player

== See also ==
- Kelley (disambiguation)
