= Kelli =

Kelli may refer to:

== Places ==
- Kelli, Drama, a former village in the Drama regional unit, Greece
- Kelli, Florina, a village in the Florina regional unit, Greece

== Notable people ==
=== Surname ===
- Keri Kelli (born 1971), American guitarist

=== Given name ===
- Kelli Ali (born 1974), English vocalist
- Kelli Arena, American television journalist and teacher
- Kelli Berglund (born 1996), American actress and dancer
- Kelli Carpenter-O'Donnell (born 1967), television executive
- Kelli Connell, American photographer
- Kelli Cousins (born 1976), American voice actress
- Kelli Finglass, American professional cheerleader
- Kelli Gannon (born 1978) American field hockey player
- Kelli Garner (born 1984), American actress
- Kelli Giddish (born 1980), American actress
- Kelli Goss (born 1992), American actress
- Kelli Harral (born 1993), American model
- Kelli Harrison, American aide to Mitt and Ann Romney
- Kelli Hollis (born 1967), British actress
- Kelli James (born 1970), American field hockey player
- Kelli Kassidi, alias of voice actor Megan Hollingshead
- Kelli Kuehne (born 1977), American golfer
- Kelli Lidell, American country singer, actress and philanthropist
- Kelli Linville (born 1948), American politician
- Kelli Maroney (born 1960), American actress
- Kelli Martin (born 1980), American fashion designer
- Kelli McCarty (born 1969), American model, actress and adult film performer
- Kelli O'Hara (born 1976), American stage actress, singer, and songwriter
- Kelli Scarr, American singer and songwriter
- Kelli Shean (born 1987), South African golfer
- Kelli Sobonya (born 1963), American politician in West Virginia
- Kelli Delaney, fashion executive and designer
- Kelli Stack (born 1988), American ice hockey forward
- Kelli Stanley (born 1964), American author
- Kelli Stargel (born 1966), American politician
- Kelli Underwood (born 1977), American sports journalist
- Kelli White (born 1977), American sprinter
- Kelli Williams (born 1970), American actress
- Kelli Young (born 1982), English singer

=== Fictional characters ===
- Kelli Lombardo Moltisanti, see List of characters from The Sopranos#Recurring characters
- Kelli Presley from Black Christmas (2006)
- Kelli is the name of an empousa in Percy Jackson
- Kelli Dunley, a character from the Lifetime movie Reviving Ophelia

== See also ==
- Kellee
- Kellie (disambiguation)
- Kelly (disambiguation)
- Kelley (disambiguation)
- KELI (disambiguation)
