= Homelink =

Homelink may refer to:

- Lianjia, formerly Homelink, a Chinese real estate company
- HomeLink Wireless Control System
- Homelink (Britain), a 1980s home banking system
