= Kellie =

Kellie may refer to:

== Surname ==
- James M. Kellie (1848–1927), Canadian miner and political figure
- Mike Kellie (1947–2017), English drummer with Spooky Tooth and The Only Ones
- J. D. Kellie-MacCallum (1845–1932), British police officer, Chief Constable of Northamptonshire County Constabulary

== Given name ==
- Kellie Abrams (born 1978), Australian professional basketball player
- Kellie Bright (born 1976), English actress
- Kellie Casey (born 1965), Canadian alpine skier
- Kellie Coffey (born 1971), American country musician
- Kellie Crawford (born 1974), Australian entertainer
- Kellie Harper (born 1977), American basketball coach
- Kellie Leitch (born 1970), Canadian politician
- Kellie-Ann Leyland (born 1986), English-born Northern Irish footballer
- Kellie Lightbourn (born 1974), American model
- Kellie Lim, disabled activist and student
- Kellie Loder (born 1988), Canadian musician
- Kellie Magnus (born 1970), Jamaican author and journalist
- Kellie Maloney (born 1953, previously known as Frank Maloney), boxing manager and promoter
- Kellie Martin (born 1975), American actress
- Kellie McMillan (born 1977), Australian swimmer
- Kellie Pickler (born 1986), American country musician and television personality
- Kellie Shirley (born 1983), British actress
- Kellie Sloane (born 1973), Australian journalist and politician
- Kellie Suttle (born 1973), American track and field athlete
- Kellie Waymire (1967–2003), American actress
- Kellie Wells (athlete) (born 1982), American track and field athlete
- Kellie Wells (writer), American author and academic
- Kellie While (born 1976), British singer-songwriter
- Kellie Shanygne Williams (born 1976), American actress

== Other ==
- Earl of Kellie, title of Scottish peers
- Kellie Castle, Scottish castle
- Kellie's Castle, a building near Ipoh in Malaysia
- MV Kellie Chouest, Deep Submergence Elevator Support Ship

== See also ==
- Kellee
- Kelly (disambiguation)
- Kelley (disambiguation)
- Kelli (disambiguation)
- KELI (disambiguation)
