= Ke Li =

Ke Li or Li Ke may refer to:

== People ==
- Li Ke (李恪; 619–653), Chinese imperial prince of the Tang dynasty
- Li Ke (windsurfer) (李科; born 1969), Chinese Olympic windsurfer
- Li Ke (footballer) (李可; born 1993), Greek-born Chinese soccer player
- Li Ke (parasailor), Chinese sailor in Sailing at the 2008 Summer Paralympics
- Li Ke (born 1980), Chinese basketball player for China at the 2007 FIBA Asia Championship squads
- Li Ke (李克), Chinese politician and mayor of Zhengzhou
- Li Ke (里克; 7th century BCE), a minister of the Jin Kingdom, who was involved in the Li Ji Unrest
- Ke Li (skier), Chinese freestyle skier who won a silver in aerials during the 2008–09 FIS Freestyle Skiing World Cup
- Miao Ke-li (苗可麗; born 1971), Taiwanese actress and singer
- Liao Keli (廖克力; born 1990), Chinese para-table-tennis player
- Ren Keli (任克礼; born 1936), Chinese politician
- Gao Keli (12th century), a Chinese rebel during the Song dynasty
- Fang Keli (方克立; 1938–2020), Chinese communist and New Confucianist scholar

== Fictional characters ==
- Li Ke (李克), a fictional character from the 2008 Taiwanese TV show Hot Shot (TV series)
- Li Ke, a fictional character from the 2006 Taiwanese TV show Romance of Red Dust
- Li Ke, a fictional character from the 2011 Chinese film Love Is Not Blind
- Fang Ke Li, a fictional character from the 2022 Chinese TV show Draw the Line (Chinese TV series)
- Guo Ke Li (郭可丽), a fictional character from the 2012 Singaporean TV show Game Plan (TV series)

== See also ==
- Li (disambiguation)
- Ke (disambiguation)
- KELI (disambiguation)
