= Jamaica Anansi Stories =

1924 book by Martha Warren Beckwith

Jamaica Anansi Stories is a book by Martha Warren Beckwith published in 1924. It is a collection of folklore, riddles and transcriptions of folk music, all involving the trickster Anansi, gathered from Jamaicans of African descent.
