= Osebo =

Character in African mythology

Osebo is the common name for the leopard character in Ashanti folk tales. According to one tale, Anansi captured him alongside Onini the python and the Mmoboro hornets, to give to the sky god Nyame in exchange for his stories. Anansi captures Osebo by digging a pit in his favorite path. When Osebo falls into the trap, Anansi offers his help by lowering a branch and offering it to Osebo. Anansi tells Osebo to tie his tail to the branch, and he does so because his trust on Anansi. However, the branch is actually a hunting trap and he is caught, killed, and skinned by Anansi.
