= Us Weekly =

American entertainment magazine founded 1977

- Us Weekly (January 13, 2014)
- Editor: Jennifer Peros
- Chief content officer: Dylan Howard
- Categories: Celebrity
- Frequency: Weekly
- Total circulation: 2,032,581 (2013)
- Founded: May 3, 1977; 49 years ago
- Company: McClatchy
- Country: United States
- Based in: New York City
- Language: English
- Website: usmagazine.com
- ISSN: 1529-7497
- OCLC: 61312882

Us Weekly is an American weekly celebrity and entertainment magazine based in New York City. The magazine was founded as Us, a bi-weekly, in 1977 by the New York Times Company, which sold it in 1980. It was acquired by Wenner Media in 1986, changed to the weekly format and renamed Us Weekly in 2000, and sold to American Media Inc. in 2017. Shortly afterward, then editor James Heidenry stepped down, and was replaced by Jennifer Peros. The chief content officer of American Media, Dylan Howard, oversees the publication.

Us Weekly covers topics ranging from celebrity relationships to the latest trends in fashion, beauty, and entertainment. As of 2017, its paid circulation averaged to more than 1.95 million copies weekly and total readership of more than 50 million consumers.

The magazine currently features a sharply different style from its original 1977–2000 format. Originally a monthly industry news and review magazine along the lines of Premiere or Entertainment Weekly, it switched format in 2000 to its current themes of celebrity news and style.

The web site Usmagazine.com was launched in fall 2006. In addition to features from the magazine, the site has a breaking celebrity news blog, exclusive photos, red carpet galleries from premieres and events, plus games, videos, quizzes and polls.

== History ==
Us was launched as a fortnightly publication in 1977 by the New York Times Company. The magazine lost money before turning its first profit in 1980. It was sold later that year to Macfadden Media. It was acquired by Jann Wenner in 1985 and is a part of Wenner Media LLC, which also publishes Rolling Stone and Men's Journal. In 1991, Us became a monthly publication.

In 1999, the company announced plans to shift the Us publication schedule from monthly to weekly. The shift coincided with a change in style from industry news and reviews to a celebrity-focused news magazine. The move was a response to several market forces, including the success of Time, Inc.'s Entertainment Weekly and People magazines. Wenner expressed his intention to keep Us "celebrity-friendly" in contrast with the more gossipy character of its competitors. He told The New York Times: "We will be nice to celebrities. A lot of my friends are in the entertainment business." The publication focuses on celebrity fashion as well as Hollywood gossip. Kelli Delaney, current New York designer for Members Only, formerly served as fashion director of the publication (1992–95). The change took effect in March 2000.

In February 2001, Wenner partnered with The Walt Disney Company. Bonnie Fuller worked as editor-in-chief of the publication from 2002 to 2003. She redesigned the title, creating the modern celebrity newsweekly. She created such signature sections as "Stars Are Just Like Us." In July 2003, Janice Min took over as editor in chief with Victoria Lasdon Rose as publisher, and Michael Steele as executive editor. Steele took over for Min in 2009. Melanie Bromley served as the magazine's West Coast bureau chief from 2007 to 2012.

In August 2006, Wenner Media re-acquired Disney's 50 percent stake, making the publication once again fully owned and operated by Wenner Media. In 2017, the publication was sold to American Media, Inc. American Media, Inc. (AMI) became A360media in October 2020 and then merged with the McClatchy local news and information company to operate as the McClatchy Media Company (MCC) as of December 2024.

In April 2026, close to half of the magazine's 50 person staff were laid off, including the entire social media team and the Spanish-language team. Its New York headquarters was also shuttered, with all staff working virtually moving forward.

== Timeline ==
- 1977: Us founded by The New York Times Company
- 1980: Us acquired by Peter J. Callahan's Macfadden Group.

The staff of Photoplay and TV Mirror, the merger of Photoplay, Movie Mirror, and TV-Radio Mirror, is merged.

- 1986: Us acquired by Straight Arrow Publishers, Inc., now known as Wenner Media LLC
- 1991: Us changes its bi-weekly frequency to become monthly
- March 2000: Us changes from a monthly format and goes weekly, changing its title to Us Weekly
- February 2001: Us Weekly partners with The Walt Disney Company
- January 2006: Us Weekly increases rate base to 1.75 Million
- July 2006: Us Weekly launches Usmagazine.com
- August 2006: Wenner Media re-acquires Disney's 50 percent stake in Us Weekly
- March 2017: American Media, Inc. bought Us Weekly from Wenner Media LLC

== Sections of the magazine ==
- Just Like Us: photos of celebrities doing things everyday people do. Inspired by a regular Sesame Street feature about animals
- Who Wore It Best?: reader polls of which celebrity wore an outfit better
- Hot Stuff: the latest gossip from inside Hollywood
- The Red Carpet: the looks and styles from Hollywood's hottest parties and premieres
- Hot Pics: celebrity sightings of stars around the globe
- Fashion Police: famous comedians cite the fashion disasters of the stars, and the best "look of the week"
- The Record: a roster of changes in the lives of stars—births, marriages, divorces, etc.
- Loose Talk: quotes from the stars
- Us Musts: according to Us Weekly, the must-see films, TV shows and DVDs

== In the media ==
In a July 2006 Variety article, Janice Min, Us Weekly editor-in-chief, cited People for the increase in cost to publishers of celebrity photos:

They are among the biggest spenders of celebrity photos in the industry. ... One of the first things they ever did, that led to the jacking up of photo prices, was to pay $75,000 to buy pictures of Jennifer Lopez reading Us magazine, so Us Weekly couldn't buy them. That was the watershed moment that kicked off high photo prices in my mind. I had never seen anything like it. But they saw a competitor come along, and responded. It was a business move, and probably a smart one.

In a June 2007 New York article, Tina Brown was asked, "Do you actually read the tabloids?"

Of course. I read everything. I adore Us Weekly. I think it's a genius magazine. I'm a big fan of magazines that fulfill the goal of what they're trying to be.

From a May 2007 New York Post article profiling New York's 50 Most Powerful Women,

Janice Min, 37, editor, Us magazine. With her mag's profits placed as high as $90 million a year and readership up 191 percent in the last five years, Janice is not just like us. Nonetheless, the success of Us is attributed partly to the mother of two's reputation as perky and well liked – as well as its addictive features like the new "Faux Biz", which makes fun of off-base gossip.

Of her front cover appearance in November 1997, Courtney Love remarked,

"I wanted to do a kind of mock-Eagles, decadent '70s California-type thing, and I ended up looking like Pamela Anderson on the cover! Bad, dirty Pam! It was terrible. But I didn't do it on purpose and it was gone in thirty days."

The magazine was criticized for allegedly biased coverage of the 2008 Republican National Convention. The September 5, 2008, issue featured Alaska Governor Sarah Palin on the cover with the headline "Babies, Lies & Scandal", while the June 19, 2008, issue featured U.S. Senator from Illinois Barack Obama and wife Michelle Obama with the headline "Why Barack Loves Her". Senior Editor Bradley Jacobs claimed that the "lies" on the cover referred to unspecified "liberal bloggers" who had speculated on the parentage of Governor Palin's child, not to the governor herself. However, nothing on the cover indicated "liberal bloggers" were the alleged liars. It was reported that the magazine had lost over 10,000 subscribers. Since then it was reported that Us Weekly sent e-mails to each of those subscribers, apologizing for the cover, and promised to send them five free copies of the magazine.

In 2009, Us Weekly partnered with Involver to become the first media company to sell sponsorships on their Facebook Page.

== Recognition ==
- Adweek's "The Hot List: Top 10 Magazines" 2004, 2005, 2006, 2007
- Advertising Age's Magazine of the Year, 2004
- Adweek Magazine's Editor of the Year, editor in chief Janice Min
- Advertising Age A-List, No. 3 in 2005, No. 1 in 2004
- Capell's Circulation Report "Top 10 Best Performers in Circulation" in 2005
