= Blooming Township, North Dakota =

- Township
- Location within North Dakota
- Coordinates: 47°58′36″N 97°18′13″W
- Country: United States
- State: North Dakota
- County: Grand Forks

Area
  - Total: 34.86 sq mi (90.28 km^{2})
  - Land: 34.25 sq mi (88.72 km^{2})
  - Water: 0.60 sq mi (1.56 km^{2})
- Elevation: 856 ft (261 m)

Population (2020)
  - Total: 301
  - Density: 8.79/sq mi (3.39/km^{2})
- Time zone: UTC-6 (Central (CST))
  - Summer (DST): UTC-5 (CDT)
- Area code: 701
- FIPS code: 38-07860
- GNIS feature ID: 1036605

Blooming Township is a township in Grand Forks County, North Dakota, United States. The population was 301 at the 2020 census.

== Geography ==
Blooming Township has a total area of 34.856 square miles (90.28 km^{2}), of which 34.254 square miles (88.72 km^{2}) is land and 0.602 square miles (1.56 km^{2}) is water.

The unincorporated community of Kelly lies within the eastern portion of the township.

== Demographics ==
As of the 2023 American Community Survey, there were an estimated 88 households.
