= Kelley Branch =

Stream in the U.S. state of Missouri

Kelley Branch is a stream in northern Boone County in the U.S. state of Missouri. It is a tributary of Silver Fork.

The stream headwaters arise just northeast of Hallsville at 39°07′11″N 92°12′40″W and the stream flows generally west to its confluence with Silver Fork just east of US Route 63 approximately 12 miles north of Columbia at 39°07′53″N 92°19′15″W.

Kelley Branch has the name of the local Kelley family of settlers.

== See also ==
- List of rivers of Missouri
