= KE =

KE, ke, and variations may refer to:

== Companies ==
- KE Holdings, a Chinese real estate broker
- Korean Air (IATA airline designator KE)

== Language ==
- Ke (kana), the romanisation of the Japanese kana け and ケ
- Small ke (ヶ), a Japanese character, a small form of ke (ケ)
- Ke (Armenian letter)

== People ==
- Ke (surname) (kē, 柯), a transliteration of a common Chinese surname
- Ké, stage name of New York singer/songwriter/actor Kevin Grivois

== Places ==
- Kenya (ISO 3166 code KE)
- County Kildare, Ireland
- Košice, Slovakia

== Science and technology ==
=== Biology and medicine ===
- KE family, a family of Pakistani origin exhibiting a severe speech disorder
- Key Event, in toxicology, an element in an adverse outcome pathway
- Kinetic energy penetrator, a type of ammunition designed to penetrate vehicle armour
- Elimination rate constant, a value used to calculate the rate at which drugs are removed from the system
- Lithocarpus glaber, the Japanese oak, called "ke" in Chinese

=== Computing and the internet ===
- .ke, internet top-level domain for Kenya
- Knowledge engineering, in computer and cognitive sciences

=== Physics ===
- Coulomb constant (k_{e})
- Kinetic energy

== Other uses ==
- Ke (unit), a traditional Chinese unit of time lasting 14.4 minutes or 15 minutes
- Operation Ke, the Japanese withdrawal from Guadalcanal in the Second World War
- The first generation Mazda CX-5 (model name KE)
