= Zuo Hui =

Chinese entrepreneur and real estate tycoon (1971–2021)

- Born: Zuo Hui; 1971
- Died: May 20, 2021 (aged 50)
- Education: Beijing University of Chemical Technology; Peking University
- Occupation: Entrepreneur
- Known for: Founder and Chairman of KE Holdings

Zuo Hui (January 1971 – May 20, 2021) was a Chinese entrepreneur, real estate tycoon and founder of KE Holdings.

== Early life and education ==
In 1992, Zuo earned a degree in computer science from Beijing University of Chemical Technology.

In 2008, he earned a Master of Business Administration from Peking University.

== Career ==
After graduating, Zuo worked in a series of sales jobs in insurance and other industries.

In 2001, he founded Beijing Lianjia, a Chinese real-estate brokerage company.

In 2010, Zuo started Yiju Taihe, which offered property-related financial services.

In 2018, Zuo founded Beike, an online brokerage platform. In the same year, Zuo created KE Holdings, an umbrella company into which he put Lianjia, Yiju Taihe and Beike.

In 2020, KE Holdings raised $2.12 billion from its IPO on the New York Stock Exchange, valuing the company at just under $40 billion.

== Net worth ==
In April 2021, Forbes estimated Zuo's net worth to be $15.5 billion.

== Death ==
Zuo died on May 20, 2021, at 50 years old as a result of an unspecified illness. Beike named CEO Peng Yongdong as the new chairman following his death.
