= LUTA Sportswear =

- LUTA logo
- Industry: Sports clothing and accessories
- Founded: 2011
- Founder: Luke Dowdney
- Headquarters: Rio de Janeiro, Brazil

LUTA Sportswear is a sports clothing company, which gives half of its profits to a charity called Fight For Peace. It was created in 2011 by Fight For Peace founder Luke Dowdney to provide financial sustainability for his charity. It has offices in Rio de Janeiro, London and New York.

LUTA was developed when Dowdney noticed that T-shirts produced for Fight For Peace's students were in such high demand, they were even being stolen from washing lines. The brand, Fightwear, was designed to reflect life in the favelas where Fight For Peace works, using graffiti-inspired fonts and bright colours. It was developed in consultation with the Central St Martins College of Art and Design.

Supporters of LUTA Sportswear and Fight for Peace include Olympic heavyweight gold medalist Anthony Joshua and British actor Idris Elba.
