= Kellie Magnus =

Jamaican writer

Kellie Magnus (born 10 December 1970, in Kingston, Jamaica) is a Caribbean author and journalist. She's known for authoring children’s books. Magnus currently works as the Country Lead for the Jamaican branch of Fight For Peace.

== Work and career ==
Magnus received her undergraduate degree from Harvard University, and an MBA in Entertainment and Media Management from Columbia University. In addition to writing and publishing children's books, she writes feature articles on Caribbean entertainment and media. Publications for which she has written include The Daily News (New York City), The Jamaica Weekly Gleaner (New York City), Caribbean Beat (BWIA In-flight magazine), and The Ticket (Trinidad).

Her most recent work was a series of children's books and parents' manuals that was part of a multimedia program called Max and Friends, and that was specially designed for children with autism and related developmental disabilities. Magnus has self-published her Little Lion series of children's books, including a book called Little Lion Goes to School, and is currently working on a series of Caribbean children's books. She is a member of JAMPACT: Jamaica Impact Inc. and serves on the board of directors of the Harlem Youth Soccer Association. Currently, she is serving as the vice-president of the Book Industry Association of Jamaica and is a coordinator of CaribLit. She also serves on the board of the Early Childhood Commission in Jamaica, and owns the small publishing company Jackmandora.

In 2014, Magnus was a featured author at the NGC Bocas Lit Fest.
