= William Kelley (baseball) =

American baseball player (born 1875)

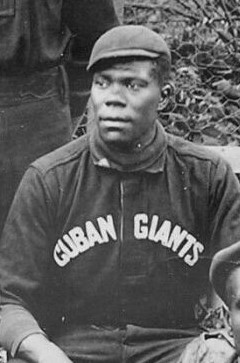
- Outfielder
- Born: May 1875; Pennsylvania, U.S.
- Died: Unknown

Negro league baseball debut
- 1900, for the Cuban Giants

Last appearance
- 1900, for the Cuban Giants

Teams
- Cuban Giants (1900)

William Kelley (May 1875 – death date unknown), nicknamed "King", was an American Negro league outfielder in 1900.

A native of Pennsylvania, Kelley played for the Cuban Giants in 1900. In his two recorded games, he went hitless with a walk in nine plate appearances.
