= List of storms named Keli =

The name Keli has been used for four tropical cyclones worldwide: two in the Central Pacific Ocean and two in the South Pacific Ocean.

In the Central Pacific:

- Hurricane Keli (1984) – remained over open waters
- Tropical Storm Keli (2025) – weak, short-lived storm that tracked south of the island of Hawaii

In the South Pacific:

- Cyclone Keli (1986) – minimal category 1 tropical cyclone (Australian scale), affected Vanuatu
- Cyclone Keli (1997) – first recorded post-season tropical cyclone to form in June within the South Pacific

The name Keli was retired in the South Pacific after the 1996–97 season.

== See also ==
- Cyclone Keila (2011) – a North Indian Ocean tropical cyclone with a similar name
