= Kellyville =

Kellyville may refer to:

== Australia ==
- Kellyville, New South Wales, suburb of Sydney
- Kellyville Ridge, New South Wales, suburb of Sydney
- North Kellyville, New South Wales, suburb of Sydney

== New Zealand ==
- Kellyville, New Zealand, a rural locality north of Mercer, New Zealand

== United States ==
- Kellyville, Kentucky, United States
- Kellyville, Oklahoma, United States
- Kellyville, Pennsylvania (in Delaware County, Pennsylvania)
- Kellyville, Texas, United States

== See also ==
- Kelleyville, village of Newport, New Hampshire
- Sondrestrom Upper Atmospheric Research Facility (colloq. Kellyville)
