= Kelly (murder victim) =

Formerly-unidentified American murder victim (1968-1991)

- Kelly, c. 1990
- Born: 1968; Virginia, U.S.
- Status: First name released on May 24, 2022
- Died: July 10, 1991 (aged 23); El Dorado, Arkansas, U.S.
- Cause of death: Homicide by cervical fracture of the spine; shot after death
- Other names: Mercedes; Cheryl Ann Wick; Kelly Lee Carr/Karr; Shannon/Sharon Wiley; Cheryl Kaufman; El Dorado Jane Doe
- Known for: Unidentified decedent

Kelly (1968 – July 10, 1991) was the first name of a 23-year-old American woman and identity thief who was murdered on July 10, 1991, in El Dorado, Arkansas, in Room 121 of the now-demolished Whitehall Motel. She used multiple names while alive, including Mercedes (which is how her friends knew her), Cheryl Ann Wick (which was the name on the identification card found with her body), Kelly Lee Carr, Kelly Karr, Shannon Wiley, Cheryl Kaufman, and Sharon Wiley; none of which were found to be her real name.

As an unidentified victim, she was known to have lived in various states prior to her death, including Texas and Louisiana, and was alleged to have engaged in sex work. While alive, she shared varying accounts of her past, suggesting that she had been arrested at one point, had one or two children, and had possibly been involved in a bank robbery on the East Coast. Her murderer was identified as her ex-boyfriend and alleged pimp James McAlphin; McAlphin was quickly convicted, but her true identity remained unknown until 2022. On May 24, 2022, her first name was revealed in an article by forensic specialist Yolanda McClary, who withheld her surname out of privacy concerns.

Prior to her partial 2022 identification, Kelly was known as the El Dorado Jane Doe.

== Early life ==
Kelly was born in 1968 in Virginia to a woman named Brenda, who was married to a man who was not Kelly's father. Kelly never knew her biological father and it is likely her father was unaware of her existence. Her earliest years were described as normal and stable until her mother and stepfather separated in 1971. They divorced the following year. By this time, Kelly had a younger half-sister.

Four months later Brenda remarried, to a man who was abusive to all of them. That marriage lasted seven years and produced one child, but Brenda gave the baby away to a nearby farm family. After that marriage dissolved, Brenda remarried again, but that marriage ended abruptly when that husband committed suicide in December 1979.

For the next two years Kelly and her sister lived with her aunt in Charlottesville, Virginia, while Brenda resided in Virginia Beach. Kelly and the sister remained with this aunt for about a year and a half until Brenda asked Kelly to move in with her. Kelly withdrew from high school in the 10th grade and found employment on the beach at a kiosk selling jewelry. Her mother at one point stole merchandise and the profits from her daughter's job. Kelly had to return the merchandise in order for her mother to avoid jail. She and her mother were forced to move three or four times after the summer of 1983 for non-payment of rent. At some point between 1984 and 1985 Kelly (who was then living in Florida) asked her aunt if she could move back in with her because she couldn't handle her mother's cocaine addiction. This living arrangement didn't last long because Kelly herself was addicted to cocaine, having been introduced to it by her mother. She returned to Florida where she underwent drug rehabilitation in 1986. During this time she also helped her mother regain her health after multiple abortions, but she also had to endure her mother's troubled lifestyle which included jail stints for drugs, bad checks, credit card theft, grand larceny, and even car theft from a car rental dealership.

After completing rehab Kelly moved back in with the same aunt, this time in Texas, as the aunt's husband was in the military and stationed there. Kelly's aunt noticed "sexy clothing" in her suitcase suggesting that she had worked as a topless dancer back home in Florida. Kelly explained to her aunt that she had become a dancer in order to obtain access to drugs and because it earned her a lot of money. She then lived with a boyfriend, but she later left him and relocated to Little Rock, Arkansas, where she lived from 1986 until 1989. Kelly then returned to her mother's house in Florida only this time her younger sister stayed with them. The sister left just a few months later after a humiliating stay during which their mother entered her into a bikini contest for money. Kelly left her mother in 1990 and moved to Norfolk, Virginia. She decided to travel to Dallas, Texas, later that year.

== Activities prior to death ==
=== Residence ===
Kelly's earliest verified location is Dallas where she was arrested for prostitution. She also worked at a KFC there. After leaving Dallas, she traveled to Shreveport, Louisiana, before going to El Dorado in early 1991. She also worked as a topless dancer in Little Rock, Arkansas, prior to her death and was found to have lived with a family in Irving, Texas.

=== Arrest record ===
- December 31, 1990 – arrested (as Cheryl Ann Wick) for prostitution at La Casita Motel in Dallas, Texas
- January 26, 1991 – arrested in Dallas
- February 8, 1991 – arrested (as Cheryl Ann Wick) for public lewdness at the Carousel Motel in Garland, Texas
- May 1991 – arrested (as Cheryl Ann Wick) for writing bad checks in El Dorado, Arkansas

=== James McAlphin ===
Kelly met James McAlphin while in Dallas. They eventually began a relationship, during which Kelly would often find herself in the emergency room due to injuries suffered at the hands of McAlphin. Before McAlphin, Kelly had been involved with other men known as Tyronne and J.D.

In June 1991, Kelly left McAlphin and moved in with a friend named Andrea Cooksey. McAlphin continued to contact Kelly with threatening messages after she left him. On July 10, he managed to get Kelly to come to his room at the Whitehall Motel with an offer of money.

A neighbor, Roy Charles Menon, witnessed part of the interaction between Kelly and McAlphin that night when he stopped by to ask for the return of some cassette tapes he had lent out. Kelly had indicated to Menon that he should talk to McAlphin and attempted to leave, going out into the parking lot before McAlphin stopped her and hit her. Yelling "get back in the room, bitch," he dragged her back into the room as Menon left. From next door, Menon heard the two arguing back and forth before a gunshot ended the dispute. Witnesses then saw McAlphin flee, getting into his vehicle and speeding off.

== Investigation ==
McAlphin was soon arrested and charged with first degree murder and second degree battery. He denied killing Kelly, claiming she had shot herself in a suicide attempt, and that he had only hit her. The police dismissed his claim. McAlphin further refused to identify the decedent unless the police agreed to do something for him.

With McAlphin uncooperative, the police looked in Kelly's possessions to glean her identity. They found a social security card and an identification card with her photo that identified her as Cheryl Ann Wick.

The police traced Wick to Minneapolis, Minnesota, and contacted her family to inform them of their loss. The Wick family responded by putting the police in touch with the real Cheryl Ann Wick who was still alive and claimed her identity had been stolen. Wick theorized her social security and identification information had been stolen while she was working as a dancer for a Minneapolis company called Party Time and denied ever having known Kelly. It has since been revealed that Kelly began to pose under this stolen identity during her stay in Florida around 1984 or 1985. Her motive for this was because the clubs she worked in only employed dancers who were 18 and over. The police were left dumbfounded with no clue as to the true identity of the then unidentified Kelly.

== Accounts of her past from Kelly ==
Kelly had told differing stories about her past, making it hard to separate fact from fiction. She told her friend Andrea Cooksey that she used to be a stripper, was from out of town, and had two kids raised by her mother with whom she did not get along. To others, she had said she was in the witness protection program and that her father was in the mafia. Some had heard that she was wanted for bank robberies on the East Coast. Police investigating her identity could not discover any bank robberies to which she could be definitively tied, nor any connection to a witness protection program or the mafia.

Kelly also mentioned accompanying a black male at truck stops, where she had been given the task of luring truck drivers in order to rob them. She claimed that one of these interactions had ended with the death of the truck driver; this led police to suspect that Kelly had been involved in the November 12, 1988, unsolved murder of truck driver Dwayne McCorkendale. A white female had been seen with a white male and a black male near the crime scene in a brown Ford Pinto. However, no definitive ties have been established.

To a volunteer at the Salvation Army in El Dorado, Kelly had shared a story about living on 1100 Cadiz Street in Dallas, the location of a local homeless shelter. She said that a daughter had been taken from her while there and that she had been unable to get the child back because she was using another name. This information could not be verified because records from the shelter for this period had been destroyed by the time this story was investigated.

== Account of her past from McAlphin ==
McAlphin claimed to know Kelly's identity and offered to reveal it in exchange for $4,000. To bolster his claim, he shared select information he claimed relates to her past.

McAlphin has claimed that Kelly had been on the streets since she was 16 when a black man she fell in love with forced her into prostitution in the Dallas/Fort Worth area. According to McAlphin, by the time she was an adult, she began prostituting of her own will. He further shared that Kelly had avoided being trafficked to Mexico by developing a relationship with a pimp named Jeffrey "JJ" Davis of Dallas before running away with another pimp named Tyronne.

Police have dismissed McAlphin as unreliable.

== 2019 developments ==
A second cousin of Kelly living in Alabama was identified by a genealogist using genetic genealogy after uploading her autosomal DNA to the GEDmatch database. The cousin did not recognize Kelly but stated she resembled members of the family.

== Identification ==
On May 24, 2022, forensic specialist Yolanda McClary published an article on her website revealing that Kelly and El Dorado Jane Doe were the same person. She was 23 at the time of her death. Kelly's mother, Brenda, never seemed to have attempted to contact or search for Kelly. Brenda moved in with Kelly's aunt in Jacksonville, Florida, in 1992. However, she stole from this aunt and moved back to Virginia where she died in 2008, never having made any contact with her family again. McClary's article noted that everything Kelly did as a teenager and young adult was, in Kelly's opinion, trying to assist her mother.

== See also ==
- List of unsolved murders (1980–1999)
- Suzanne Sevakis
- Lori Erica Ruff
- Joseph Newton Chandler III
