= Kelly, North Dakota =

- Unincorporated community
- Location within North Dakota Location within the United States
- Coordinates: 47°58′48″N 97°14′43″W
- Country: United States
- State: North Dakota
- County: Grand Forks
- Township: Blooming
- Elevation: 840 ft (260 m)
- Time zone: UTC-6 (Central (CST))
  - Summer (DST): UTC-5 (CDT)
- ZIP code: 58203 (Grand Forks)
- Area code: 701
- GNIS feature ID: 1033615

Kelly is an unincorporated community in eastern Grand Forks County, North Dakota, United States. It lies approximately 13 miles (21 km) northwest of the city of Grand Forks, the county seat of Grand Forks County. Kelly's elevation is 840 feet (256 m).

== History ==
Kelly was named for Byron St. Clair Kelly, a stage coach driver and settler, born July 4, 1839, in Richford, New York. On February 1, 1864, Kelly married Sena Lomitz Andrus in Lake City, Minnesota. The couple moved around south and central Minnesota, settling in Lake City, Mankato, and St. Cloud, Minnesota, spending just four years in each town. The couple had two children, Charles James was born in Mankato in 1864, and Ciara Ada in Lake City in 1866. By the early 1870's, the Kelly Family had settled in Grand Forks County, North Dakota.

The Kelly family were the first settlers of Acton Township, Walsh County, North Dakota, in 1870. On his land, Byron established a stage station and opened a post office in 1871. A settlement grew around his businesses, known locally as "Kelly's Point" or "Kelly's Landing" in what is now Acton. When the Northern Pacific Railway was constructed across the northeast section of Grand Forks County in 1881, the settlement moved 12 miles to section 13 of Blooming Township to meet it. A post office opened on February 14, 1889, under the "Kelly" name with Daniel B. Thompson as postmaster.

Kelly first appeared on maps in 1892, commonly misspelled "Kellys" or "Kelley". The settlement had another post office from c. 1895 until its discontinuation in 1935, also using the "Kellys" spelling.
