= Kelli Delaney =

American businesswoman

Kelli Delaney is an American businesswoman and the president, designer, and creative director for the re-launch of the Members Only clothing line. Before that, Delaney spent 14 years creating and editing fashion, beauty, and celebrity news publications, including Glamour and Allure.

Delaney began her career in the media industry working for Conde Nast Publications where she served as a fashion editor at Glamour and Allure, producing and styling photo shoots, including more than 50 covers.

In 2001, Delaney helped launch Us Weekly with Bonnie Fuller, where she worked for two years as the Fashion Director and was an integral part of the design, and evolution of the title. Before launching Celebrity Living, Delaney was the creative director of Star magazine for two years and led their redesign.

In the spring of 2005, Delaney edited Celebrity Living magazine with American Media, Inc.
