= Kelley and Browne Flats =

- U.S. National Register of Historic Places
- U.S. Historic district
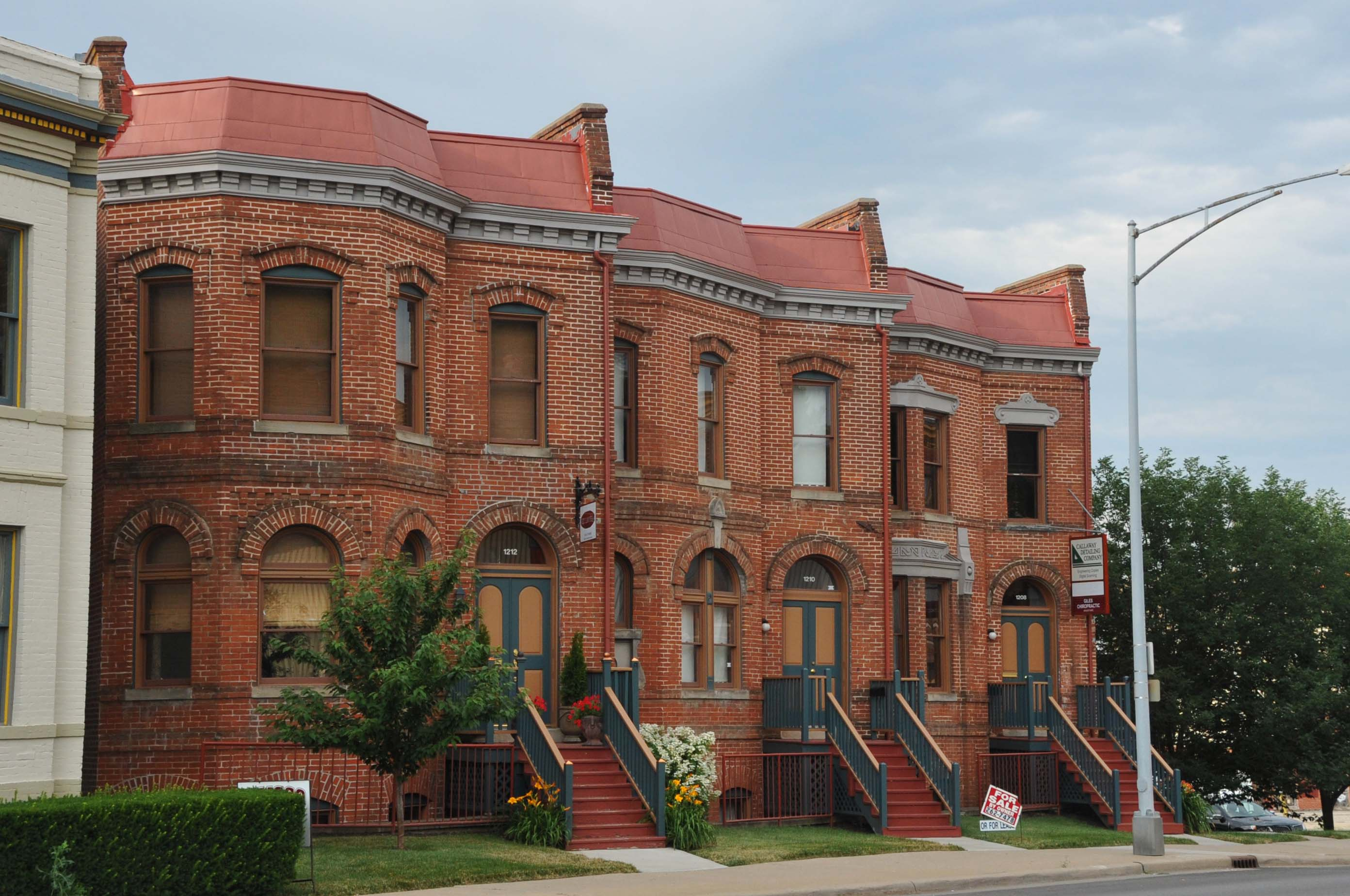
- Kelley and Browne Flats, July 2013

- Location within Missouri Location within the United States
- Location: 1208-1216 Frederick Ave., St. Joseph, Missouri
- Coordinates: 39°46′12″N 94°50′41″W
- Area: less than one acre
- Built: 1888, c. 1890
- Architectural style: Queen Anne
- MPS: St. Joseph MPS
- NRHP reference No.: 89000991
- Added to NRHP: August 3, 1989

Kelley and Browne Flats is a national historic district located at St. Joseph, Missouri. The district encompasses two sets of rowhouses consisting of five contributing buildings. They were built in 1888 and about 1890, and both are two-story brick buildings with Queen Anne style detailing.

It was listed on the National Register of Historic Places in 1989.
