= Lianjia =

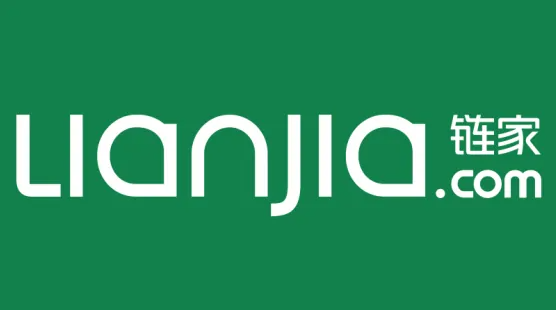

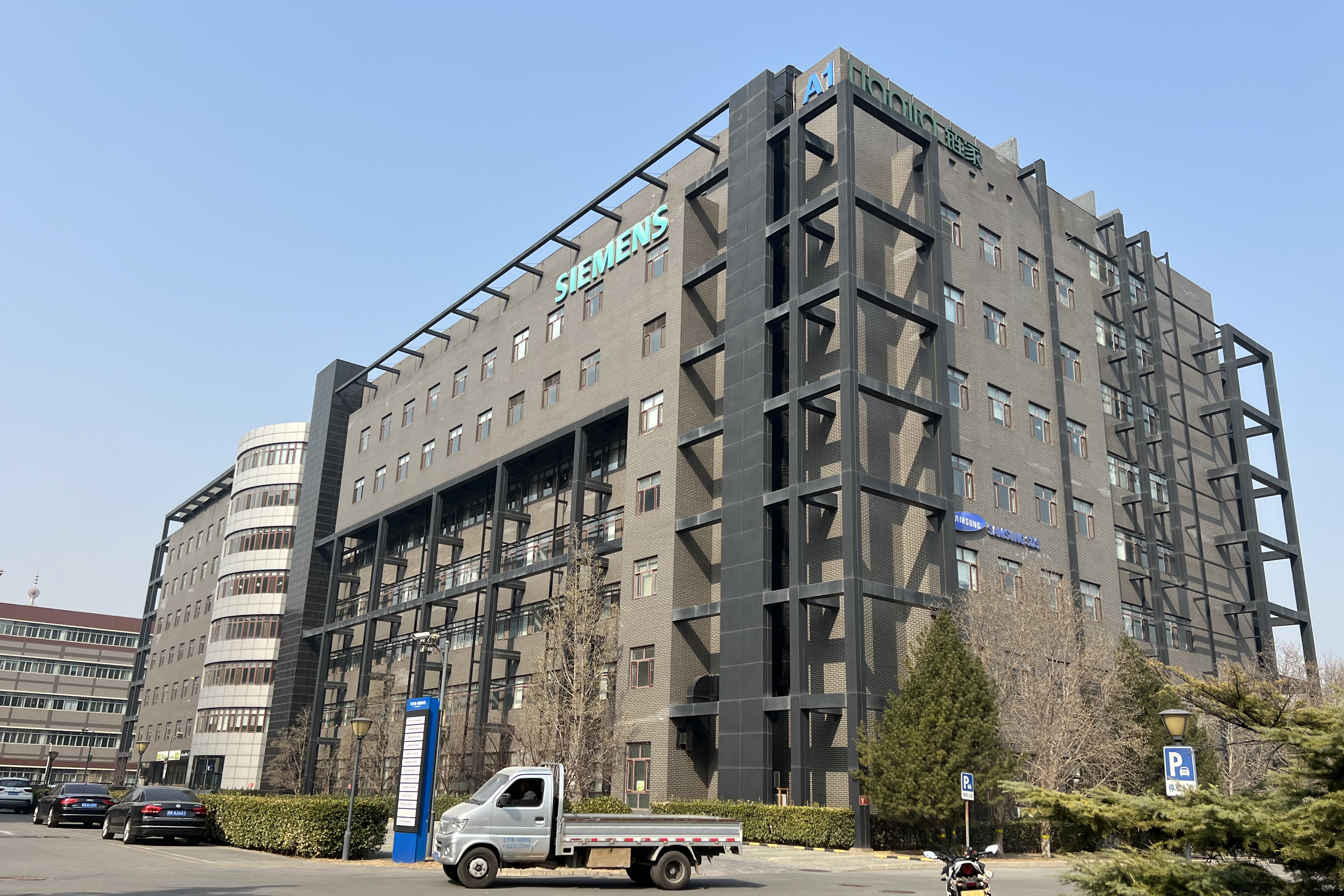
- Headquarters in Beijing
- Formerly: Homelink
- Type: Subsidiary
- Industry: Real estate
- Founded: 2001
- Founder: Zuo Hui
- Area served: China
- Number of employees: 30,000 (2014); 16,000 (2012); 27 (2001)
- Parent: KE Holdings
- Website: lianjia.com
- Footnotes; Number of Employees

Lianjia (Chinese: 链家), formerly called Homelink, is a Chinese real-estate brokerage company founded in 2001. As of 2019, it had approximately 6,000 brokerage offices and more than 120,000 brokers.

By the end of 2015, Lianjia had handled 700 billion yuan worth of real-estate transactions in total. In Beijing, it occupied 55-60% real-estate brokerage market. As of 2019, Lianjia had 51 subsidiaries, all related to the real-estate services, such as long-term rental apartment development, real-estate financing or decoration. By 2018, Lianjia' s market value had reached US$6 billion.

== History ==
Homelink was founded by Zuo Hui in November 2001 with an initial staff of 27 people. On December 2, its first offline brokerage office was opened at "Tianshuiyuan". In 2004, Homelink offered the strategy of "Non-price difference" and tried to reduce the price difference between the market price and trading price. Homelink also developed its own financial center to operate its equity and built professional teams for warrant and loan services in 2005. In 2006, Homelink proposed the concept of "exclusive listing" which owners singularly entrust their property to the company on receiving the promise of a sale within a certain period. If the company fails to deliver the sale within that period, it returns the property to the seller along with the payment of liquidated damages." Homelink launched its first online platform at lianjia.com.

In September 2014, the company was noted as "Beijing's largest real estate agency by market share" with 52% of the market, at which point it had 1,500 branches in eight cities. On October 24, 2014, Homelink stopped the cooperation with "Fang.com" and lost part of real-estate information and resources. But it changed its brand name to "Lianjia". In the same year, Homelink commenced two financial services. One is the third-party payment business "Lifangtong", which is responsible for fund trusteeship, and the other is a peer-to-peer (P2P) financial services "licailianjia". More specifically, "Lifangtong" has obtained a third-party payment license issued on July 15, 2015. Although it could guarantee the safety of the funds in the process of transactions, many people doubted it. The public focused on the suspected misappropriation of funds and the deregulation of housing funds. In 2015, the cumulative turnover of "licailianjia" reached 13.8 billion Chinese yuan, with approximately 320,000 investors. At the end of 2014, Homelink have merged real-estate intermediaries such as "Yicheng" in Chengdu, "Deyou" in Shanghai, "Yijia" in Beijing and so on to extend its market size. Started from 2016, the aim of Homelink in the next five years was to find more investors and cooperators, on April 6, Homelink completed 6 billion Chinese yuan external finance, and on July 24, Ray White has signed an agreement to list newly built and pre-owned properties and cooperated its agency services with Homelink. Lianjia will co-list Ray White's Australian and New Zealand properties and upload the housing information in Mandarin on its websites. Moreover, in September 2017, Lianjia signed a strategic investment agreement with Century 21 which meant that Lianjia hold 10% of fully diluted shares of Century 21. On June 26, 2018, Lianjia signed with Gridsum Holding Inc, the leading provider of cloud-based big-data analytics and artificial intelligence. Gridsum Holding Inc. decided to provide a Marketing Automation to Homelink as its open-listing platforms in the future. The system will be used in Lianjia.com and Ke.com. In the same year, on September 5, Tencent decided to invest 1 billion US dollar to Homelink and cooperate with its core business in property brokerage.

== Awards ==
- Top Ten Brand Institution Awards for Real Estate Brokerage Industry
- 3.15 Honesty Alliance Real Estate Agency
- Grade I Qualifications of Intermediary Service Institutions for Stock Housing in Beijing
- Vice President Firm of Beijing Real Estate Agency Association

== Controversies ==
=== Illegal lending ===
In February 2016, Lianjia was accused of suspected concealment of true information, luring and misleading uninformed consumers to buy problem houses. Moreover, Lianjia also offered illegal mortgage loans and breaching contracts to unwitting buyers. On February 24, The Consumer Insurance Commission in Shanghai announced two illegal lending cases of Lianjia, including illegal sales of mortgage houses. After the supervision, all so-called "financial products" were suspended from February 24 and the funds in P2P platform were supervised by the third party. The manager of Homelink proposed the improvement of the management system and returned all the consumers' payment back.

=== Formaldehyde levels ===
In December 2017, some of the Ziroom rental houses under Lianjia were suspected of exceeding the formaldehyde standard. It caused many tenants felt headaches and coughs. According to the national standard, the maximum indoor formaldehyde concentration is 0.1 mg/m^{3}, but the tests has shown that the indoor formaldehyde concentration in Ziroom living room reached 1.018 mg/m^{3}. Ziroom announced that consumers were able to ask all the rents back or change other services at any time. Alternatively, Ziroom will provide free air purifiers for 90 days.
