= Kelli Harral =

American model and beauty queen

Kelli Harral (born November 28, 1993) is a model and beauty queen from Fort Stockton, Texas. She was crowned Miss Texas Teen USA in 2009 after an unsuccessful run in 2008. She represented Texas at the Miss Teen USA 2009 pageant. She owns and operates her own dance studio, Kelli's Dance Studio LLC in Fort Stockton.
