= Harlem Youth Soccer Association =

Logo of the FC Harlem Lions

Harlem Youth Soccer Association is a Harlem-based, non-profit youth development organization using soccer as a means of doing social development. The program serves youth in the Harlem/South Bronx community, focusing on boys and girls aged 5–12 and youth aged 13–19. According to Irvine Smalls Jr., member of the board of directors, "“The real goal is to develop these kids holistically in a nontraditional sport.”

== About the logo ==
The logo portraits as a shield featuring the lion's head which is widely understood as a symbol of strength, the lion also symbolizes other attributes such as courage, strength, honor, and leadership.
