= Beike =

Chinese real estate platform

KE Holdings Inc.
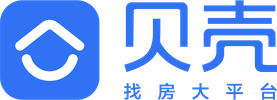

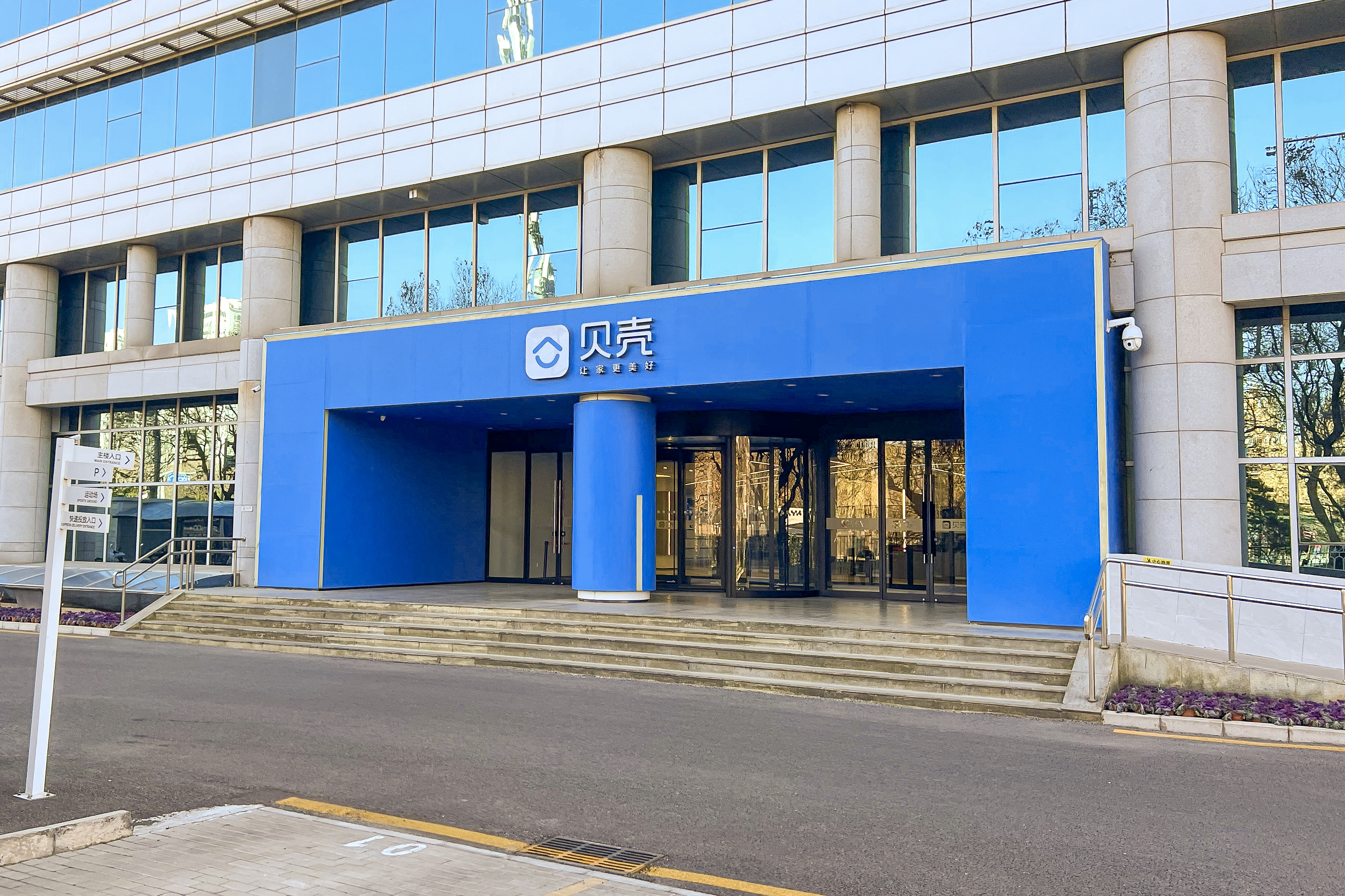
- Headquarters in Beijing
- Trade name: Beike
- Native name: 贝壳控股有限公司
- Company type: Public
- Traded as: NYSE: BEKE; SEHK: 2423
- Industry: Real estate
- Founded: 6 July 2018; 7 years ago
- Founders: Zuo Hui; Peng Yongdong; Shan Yigang
- Headquarters: Beijing, China
- Key people: Peng Yongdong (Chairman & CEO)
- Revenue: ▲CN¥77.78 billion (2023)
- Net income: ▲CN¥5.89 billion (2023)
- Total assets: ▲CN¥120.33 billion (2023)
- Total equity: ▲CN¥72.20 billion (2023)
- Number of employees: 116,344 (2023)
- Subsidiaries: Beike; Lianjia
- Website: www.ke.com

KE Holdings Inc. (KE; Chinese: 贝壳控股有限公司; pinyin: Bèiké Kònggǔ Yǒuxiàn Gōngsī) is a publicly listed Chinese real estate holding company that engages in the provision of an integrated online and offline platform for housing transactions and services through its subsidiaries. It is the largest online real estate transaction platform in China.

Investors often refer to the collective business as "Beike".

== Background ==
Lianjia (formerly Homelink) was founded as a real estate brokerage by Zuo Hui in November 2001 with initially 27 employees.

Due to the competition for real estate brokerages, information was not centralized and it was difficult to maintain accurate up to date information. In April 2018, Zuo, Peng Yongdong and Shan Yigang launched Beike, an online platform that helps match customer to real estate agents. KE was incorporated in July 2018 as a holding company for both Lianjia and Beike.

At the start, Beike drew most of its senior management from Lianjia. It aimed to establish an independent third-party trading platform similar to Taobao that would allow resources to be open to all real estate agents. Zuo came up with the idea of an agent cooperation network after studying multiple service listing systems in the U.S.

KE received financial backing from Tencent, SoftBank Group and Hillhouse Investment.

In August 2020, KE held its initial public offering on the New York Stock Exchange (NYSE) raising US$2.12 billion. On the first day of trading, the stock jumped 87% valuing the company at just under US$40 billion.

In May 2022, KE became a dual-listed company after it listed its shares on the Hong Kong Stock Exchange.

== Business structure ==
KE owns two majors businesses. Lianjia and Beike. Lianjia is a real estate agent while Beike is an online platform that helps match customers to estate agents (which includes Lianjia). Lianjia has been compared to Redfin while Beike has been compared to Zillow.

KE operates four business segments:

- Existing home transaction services
- New home transaction services
- Home renovation and furnishing
- Emerging and other services

== Controversies ==
On 20 May 2021, KE's co-founder and then chairman, Zuo died of illness resulting in KE's stock price dropping more than 10% afterwards. According to a shareholder, although Zuo was diagnosed with cancer several years ago, KE never disclosed his health issues in its regulatory filing which could raise the risk of allegations of failure to disclose key information. He was succeeded by Peng as KE's new chairman.

Shortly after, it was stated that the State Administration for Market Regulation was investigating KE for suspected anticompetitive practices. However KE via WeChat released a statement saying it was "fake news".

In December 2021, Muddy Waters Research announced it taken a short position against KE after it released a report stating that KE had committed "systemic fraud" and inflated its sales and revenue figures in its financial statements. KE stated the report was flawed and had used an invalid methodology although it would conduct an internal review of the allegations. Robbins Geller Rudman & Dowd LLP launched a class action lawsuit on behalf of investors against KE accusing its disseminating false and misleading Information. In April 2024, judge Gregory H. Woods dismissed most of the shareholder case but stated there was some validity based on the report that KE's filings did contain false statements.

In April 2022, KE was added to the U.S. Securities and Exchange Commission watchlist after failing afoul the Holding Foreign Companies Accountable Act.
