= Silver Fork =

Stream in the U.S. state of Missouri

Silver Fork is a stream in Boone County in the U.S. state of Missouri. It is a tributary of Perche Creek.

The stream headwaters arise at 39°05′36″N 92°09′07″W and the confluence with Perche Creek is at 39°04′03″N 92°23′30″W. The stream origin is about five miles south of Centralia and the stream flows north to northwest passing under Missouri Route 124. It then turns toward the southwest and passes under US Route 63 approximately ten miles north of Columbia and continues to its confluence approximately 1.5 mile southwest of Dripping Spring.

Silver Fork was named after Hugh Silvers, a pioneer citizen.

== See also ==
- List of rivers of Missouri
