= Kenneth Keith Kelley =

American chemist

Kenneth Keith Kelley (1901–1991) was an American chemist who worked in the fields of physical chemistry and metallurgy.

== Career ==
Kelley obtained his Ph.D. in physical chemistry from Stanford University in 1926 under George Sutton Parks (1894–1966), a noted researcher in the field of chemical thermodynamics. From 1927 to 1928, Kelley served as a National Research Council Fellow in Chemistry at the University of California. From 1928 to 1929, he was appointed an acting assistant professor at Stanford. In 1929, Kelley went to work as an associate physical chemist for the Region III Pacific Experiment Station of the Metallurgical Division of the United States Bureau of Mines in Berkeley, California. He eventually became a chemist (1937), senior chemist (1941), and finally Chief of the Minerals Thermodynamics Branch (1959). He retired from this post in 1964. From 1964 to 1969, Kelley was a lecturer in metallurgy at UC-Berkeley.

== Research papers ==
Kelley is well known for a large number of technical papers (≈85) on the thermochemical properties (e.g. free energy, enthalpy, entropy, heat capacity, vapor pressure) of many different inorganic substances (including elements, compounds, and alloys) from the 1930s to the 1960s, published primarily in the U.S. Bureau of Mines Bulletin. Some of these articles were independent research (particularly high-temperature calorimetry) and some were compilations of data from many sources (review articles), in which he assessed, tabulated, summarized, and/or correlated the results from different studies. With Ralph Hultgren, P. D. Anderson, and R. L. Orr, Kelley published the Selected Values of Thermodynamic Properties of Metals and Alloys (Wiley & Sons, New York, ISBN 0-471-42062-X) in 1963. This was a 963-page treatise that was subsequently revised by the American Society for Metals in 1973 with two companion books: Selected Values of Thermodynamic Properties of Binary Alloys and Selected Values of Thermodynamic Properties of the Elements. These two books contained new data that was either not available at the time of the original publication or that replaced less reliable data from outdated measurement techniques.

Kelley's work is still often cited in theoretical metallurgy. His research was very influential in, and was expanded on later by, that of others, such as UC-Berkeley metallurgy professor Ralph Hultgren (1905–1993), as well as Lawrence B. Pankratz, Alia D. Mah, and Edward G. King of the U.S. Bureau of Mines. Kelley was named an honorary member of the American Ceramic Society in 1985.
