= Fight For Peace =

International youth support organization

Fight For Peace logo

Fight for Peace (Luta pela Paz) is a global organisation that supports young people to reach their full potential in communities affected by crime and violence.

== History ==
In 2000, British amateur boxer Luke Dowdney founded a small boxing club in Complexo da Maré, a deprived area of Rio de Janeiro. Dowdney had been the captain of his university boxing team, and visited Brazil whilst studying for his anthropology degree in 1995. The Complexo da Maré club grew into Fight For Peace, an organisation which used boxing and martial arts as a means of outreach work to the children and youth of local favelas who were involved with violence, guns and drugs. In 2005, the Fight for Peace Sports and Education Centre was constructed, providing training facilities, classrooms and an IT suite.

In April 2008, Dowdney opened the first Fight For Peace center in the UK North Woolwich E16 2LR, and announced plans to expand into South Africa and Colombia.

== Approach ==
Whilst founded on boxing and martial arts training, Fight For Peace stress that their "Five Pillars" encompass a more holistic approach to education. As well as teaching sports combat skills, the organisation teaches personal development and citizenship, and provides mentoring and vocational training to help students into employment. Older students can opt to take the Novos Caminhos (New Paths) fast-track program, which emphasises formal education.

== LUTA Sportswear ==
Dowdney's LUTA Sportswear brand launched in 2011. 50% of the company's profits are used to support the Fight For Peace program.
