= Ren Keli =

Chinese politician

- 任克礼

Chairman of the Henan Provincial People's Congress
- In office 1998–2003
- Preceded by: Li Changchun
- Succeeded by: Li Keqiang

Personal details
- Born: July 1936 (age 90) Wuwei County, Anhui, China
- Party: Chinese Communist Party

Chinese name
- Simplified Chinese: 任克礼
- Traditional Chinese: 任克禮
Transcriptions
Standard Mandarin
- Hanyu Pinyin: Rén Kèlǐ

Ren Keli (Chinese: 任克礼; born 1936) was a Chinese politician.

He was born in Wuwei County, Anhui. He was chairman of the Henan Provincial People's Congress between 1998 and 2003. He was a delegate to the 6th National People's Congress (1983–1988), 7th National People's Congress (1988–1993) and 9th National People's Congress (1998–2003). He was on the Standing Committee of the 10th National People's Congress (2003–2008) and 11th National People's Congress (2008–2013).

Assembly seats
Preceded by Li Changchun	Chairman of the Henan Provincial People's Congress; 1998–2003	Succeeded by Li Keqiang
