= Kellee =

American singer

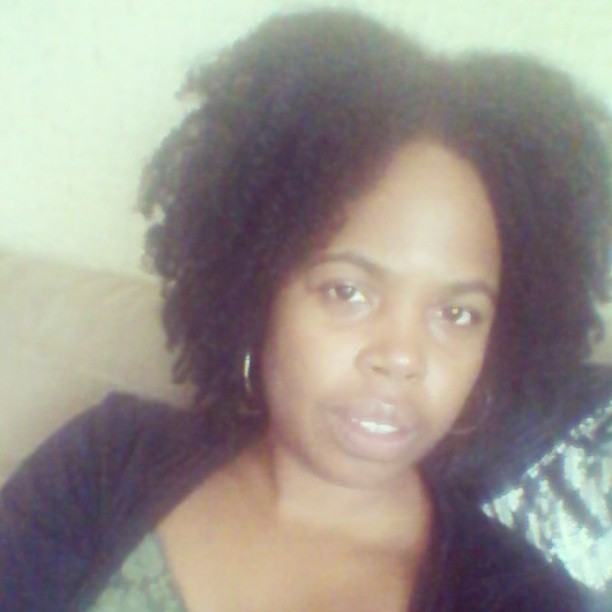
- Kellee in 2013

Background information
- Also known as: Kellee
- Born: Kellee Elizabeth Warren; 1971 (age 54–55)
- Genres: Electronica and house
- Occupations: Singer, songwriter
- Instrument: Vocals
- Years active: 1996–present
- Label: Independent Dance

Kellee Elizabeth Warren (born 1971), or just simply known as Kellee, is a female electronica and house music artist from Chicago, Illinois. She scored two hits on the Billboard Hot Dance Music/Club Play chart: "My Love", which peaked at number 5 in 1995, and "This Man", which went all the way to number 1 in 1997. She graduated from The Soma Institute for clinical massage therapy in 2005 and received her associate's degree from Prairie State College in 2010. She was working on an EP, but decided to retire from recording in 2015 in order to work on her undergraduate degree at the University of Illinois at Chicago.

== Singles ==
- "My Love" (1996)
- "This Man" (1997)

== Legacy ==
"My Love" was remade in 2005 by the American house music act 8Ball. The vocals from the original were used in the remake.

== See also ==
- List of number-one dance hits (United States)
- List of artists who reached number one on the US Dance chart
