= Nyankapon-Nyame-Odomankoma =

Akan Supreme god

Nyame (Ono nya me)
- Supreme God and Sky Father
- Venerated in: Akɔm
- Ethnic group: Akan • Asante, Bono Fante • Afro-Caribs

Genealogy
- Spouse: Asase Yaa
- Children: Bia • Tano/Tano

Equivalents
- Roman: Jupiter
- Bakongo: Nzambi Mpungu
- Egyptian: Amun
- Igbo: Chukwu

Onyame, Nyankopɔn (Onyankopɔng) or Ɔdomankoma is the supreme god of the Akan people of Ghana, who is most commonly known as Nyame. The name means "The one who knows and sees everything", and "omniscient, omnipotent sky deity" in the Akan language.

== Names ==
=== Odomankoma ===
The name Ɔdomankoma, spelt Odomankoma in English, means "Creator" which is said to be derived from the literal translations of the two sections of his name, "Dom" (meaning state or universe) and "Anko-ma" (meaning "who alone gives"). The name "Odomankoma" therefore means, in the literal sense, "The only one who gives the universe or world". However, others believe Odomankoma is an abbreviation of Odomankoma's full and true name: O-doma-ara-nko-ma in which all parts of the name (excluding the first o) has a meaning: "Doma" meaning 'abundance', "nko" meaning "only" or "alone", "ma" meaning "full of", coming together to mean "The one who is uninterruptedly, infinitely, and exclusively full of the manifold, namely, the interminable, eternally, infinitely, universally filled entity'.

Odomankoma is also known by the name Odomankoma wuo, which means "The Creator's death", referencing Odomankoma as the creator of Death (Owuo), later being killed in return. Odomankoma also goes by various other epithets: "Oboade" meaning "Creator", "Oboo nkwa" meaning "The Creator of life", and "Oboo-wuo" meaning "The Creator of death", which once again references to Odomankoma creating Owuo.

Odomankoma also bears the epithets "Borebore", meaning "Architect", and "Ananse Kokuroko", meaning "The great designer" or, if interpreted literally, "The great spider". This name shows that beyond the fact that Odomankoma possesses a Godly level of wisdom as in the Akom belief, it also shows his connection to Ananse, who is a spider and additionally might be directly Odomankoma's son. Odomankoma is also known as "Amaomee" meaning "The giver of plenty", linking to him being the creator in the Akom religion.

=== Onyankopon ===
The name Onyankopɔn, spelt Onyankopon in the English language, literally means "The Only Great Onyame" which is said to be derived from the 3 parts that supposedly make up Onyankopon's name: "Onyame" shortened to "Onyan", "Koro" shortened to "Ko" meaning one and "Pɔn(g)" meaning great. His full name is Onyankopɔn.

Onyankopon also goes by other epithets: Otumfuɔ meaning "the powerful one", Otweadeapɔn Kwame meaning "the Great one who appeared on Saturday" symbolising that was born on a Saturday and Twidiampon(g) meaning "all powerful Nyankapon(g) and Amowia meaning "The giver of the sun", referencing to Nyankopon's link to the sun. Onyankopon also shares names with Ɔdomankoma, written as Odomankoma, as Odomankoma became the spirit of Onyankapon after Owuo killed Odomankoma, so along with other names for Odomankoma, the names Ɔpanyin, written as Opanyin, or Nana are used, meaning "Grand Ancestor". According to some versions of Akan oral tradition, Nyankapon is associated with the Fante patron deity Bobowissi, as well as the God stated as the supreme God in other traditional religions of peoples in Akan dominated countries such as Ivory Coast and Ghana specifically. However, they could either be their own Supreme God or Onyame, another aspect of the Akom Trinity and the parent to Onyankopon.

== Description ==
Adinkra Symbol: Gye Nyame

Odomankoma is an epithet referencing the creative traits, corresponding to reason, reality and the Absolute, is the spirit of the Universe and is one of the most dynamic and complex modalities of the trinity. Odomankoma is consistently cast in the role of creator. This creative function of Odomankoma is embodied in several maxims. One saying of the Akan surrounding Odomankoma is "Odomankoma boo ade", meaning Odomankoma created the "Thing" (the universe). Odomankoma created not only the "Thing," i.e., the universe. He also created life and created death as well. Mysteriously Odomankoma himself succumbed to death. This juxtaposition of life (himself, the creator) with death in Odomankoma is expressed by one of the more complex and often-quoted Akan maxims: "Odomankoma boo owuo na owuo kum no", which means Odomankoma created death (Owuo) and death killed him. Odomankoma accommodates the contraries of life and death within his being. As the creator of both life and death, he transcends both experiences. The story of Odomankoma does not end with Owuo killing him as after his death. According to Akan belief, life, identified with the creator, returned to awaken him. From here he revived as Kra, and lives through Nyankopon, becoming Nyankopon's sunsum (soul), as stated in the Akan maxim "Onyankopon onye Odomankoma sunsum" which means Nyankopon is Odomankoma's personality, symbolising that Nyankopon is Odomankoma's successor (as Odomankoma used to be the aspect of the Nyame trinity that controlled everything until Owuo killed him). Odomankoma is also powerful and smart as after his "revival", Nyankopon/Odomankoma had a great struggle with Owuo in which they defeat Owuo by being able to withstand Owuo's venom, kra (whom was now Odomankoma). Odomankoma then managed to achieve a total triumph over Death, as stated in the maxim "Odomankoma na orna owuo di akane", which means it was none but Odomankoma who made Death eat poison. In this second meeting between Odomankoma and his final creation, Owuo, According to the tradition, Odomankoma used his creative power to confront Owuo as, after having been vanquished, death is made to eat his poison. However, despite defeating Owuo, Owuo is still alive and causes death to mortals.

It is said that he talks through a drum and has a drummer for that drum called Odomankoma Kyerema.The Drummer of Odomankoma is said to be the most knowledgeable person regarding Asante traditional history. Odomankoma has a set of stories and tales called Adomankomasem, similar to Ananse.

Odomankoma is also represented by two animals namely: vultures and spiders. Odomankoma's link to vultures is expressed in the Akan maxim: "Odomankoma a Ɔbɔadeɛ, ne kyeneboa ne opete", meaning the vulture is animal that symbolizes Odomankoma, the creator of the world. The spider connotation comes the belief by the Akan that spiders are the wisest of all animals. In some versions of Akan oral tradition, Ananse is believed to have advised Odomankoma in the creation of humans. However, Odomankoma goes by the name Ananse Kokuroko, so it might have been just him. Odomankoma also has a human form, but storyteller rarely treat him as having a human form.

== Symbol ==
Nyame is the Twi word for God, and the Adinkra symbol "Gye Nyame" means "I Fear None Except God".

The symbol has adopted a different use and meaning in today's Akan culture due to the influence of Christianity.

== See also ==
- Akan religion
