= Asase Ya/Afua =

Akan goddess

Asase Ya
- Goddess of Earth, Fertility, Love, Peace, Procreation, Sky, and Truth
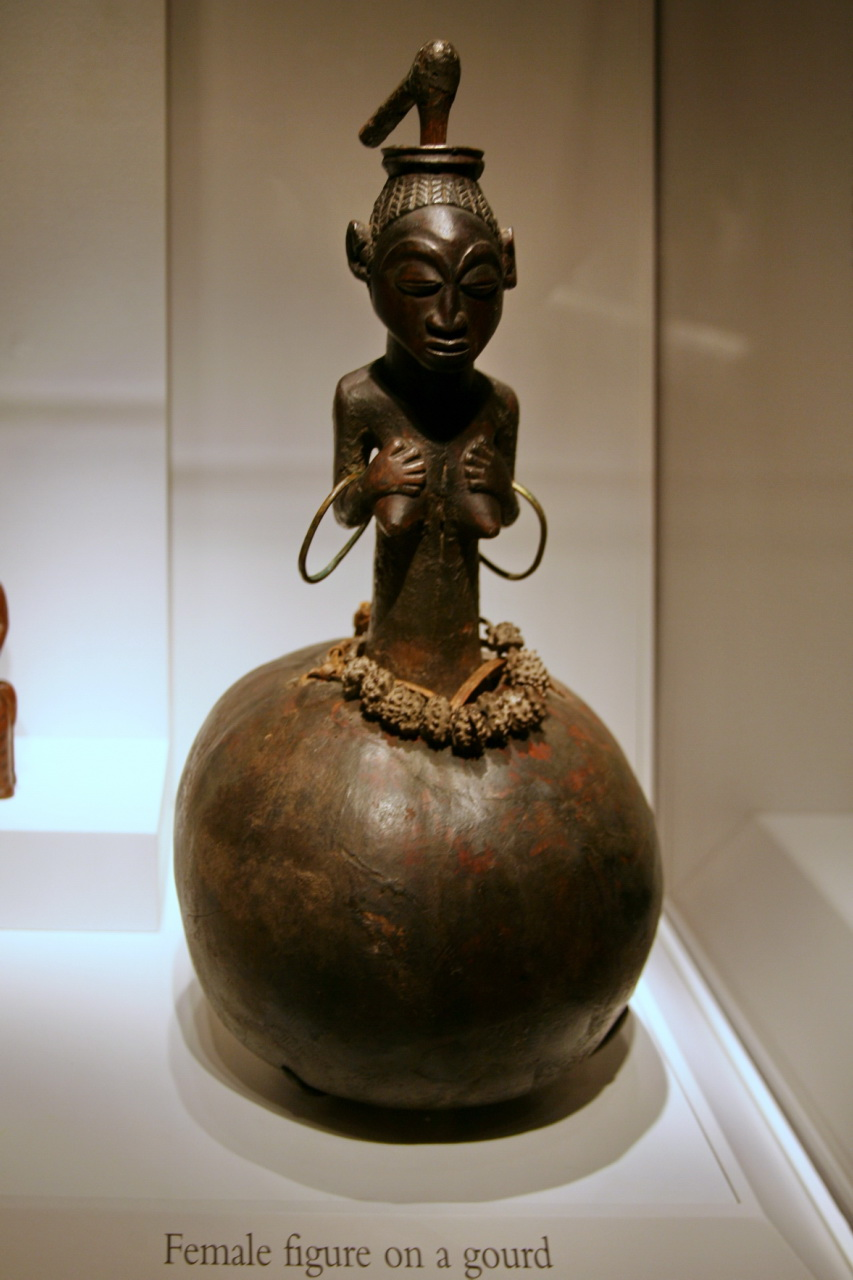
- Venerated in: Akom
- Planet: Jupiter
- Ethnic group: Akan people

Genealogy
- Spouse: Nyame
- Children: Bia • Tano/Tano

Equivalents
- Roman: Juno
- Bakongo: Nzambici
- Egyptian: Amunet
- Igbo: Ala

Asase Ya/Afua (or Asase Yaa, Asaase Yaa, Asaase Afua, Asaase Efua) is the Akan goddess of fertility, love, procreation, peace, truth and the dry and lush earth in Ghana and Ivory Coast. She is also Mother of the Dead known as Mother Earth or Aberewaa.

Asase is the wife of Nyankapon, the male sky deity. Asase gave birth to two children, Bea and Tano. Bea is also named Bia. In some folklore tales, Asase is also the mother of Anansi, the trickster, and divine stepmother of the sacred high chiefs.

Asase is very powerful, though no temples are dedicated to her, instead, she is worshipped in the agricultural fields of the Asante and other Akans. Asase is highly respected amongst Akans. Sacrifices are given to her for favour and blessings. Asase's favoured people are the Bono people. Planet Earth is Asase Yaa's symbol whilst Venus is Asase Afua's symbol.

== Names ==
The name Asase means 'Land' in Twi. The name Ya means 'one born on Thursday, meaning that Asase was created on a Thursday. However, the name Afua means 'one born on Friday', meaning that in she was created on Friday. In actuality, the Asante believe that Asase was created on a Thursday while the Fante believe that Asase was created on a Friday. Due to this, the Asante and most other Akans call Asase 'Asase Ya' meaning 'Earth born on Thursday' whilst the Fante and the other Akans call Asase 'Asase Efua (Afua)' meaning 'Earth born on Friday'.

The Asante also know Asase Ya as Aberewaa, meaning 'old woman'.

Asase is also known as 'Asase bo ne nsie' meaning 'Earth, creator of the underworld'.

== Description ==
Asase has two differing descriptions and, thus, two different personalities. However, they are both one deity.

Asase Yaa: Asase Yaa is described as an old woman, linked to the other meaning of the name Asase Yaa; Old Mother Earth, and the other name Asase Yaa is known as, Aberewaa. As such she is regarded as the Goddess of the barren places on earth and the dead (she is the mother of the Dead). Asase Yaa is also the Goddess of Truth and Peace and is consulted on matters of the community through divination. As the Goddess of Truth and the Mother of the dead, she governs the gateway to Asamando, the Akan Ancestral Realm. At death, Asase Yaa reclaims her mortal children, humanity.

Asase Afua: Asase Afua, by contrast, is depicted as a youthful, incredibly beautiful woman. Due to this, she is regarded as the Goddess of the fertile places on earth, fertility, farming, love and procreation. Mmoatia, the dwarf-like spirits who serve as the protective guardians of nature and the forests in which they dwell, are seen as both her servants and spiritual agents, similar to how baboons are the custodians of Ta Kora. Asase Afua is have said to have given birth to all of humanity, despite the Asante proverb that says that all of mankind are children of Nyame, not Asase, although this actually applies to one's Sunsum and Kra (Ego and Soul), not Mogya (blood) and Honam (body). It is this form of Asase who is the wife of Nyankapon. Asase Afua is represented by the antelope and either still is, or used to be, represented by the goat . The antelope has 10 coils on the left horn and 8 coils on the right, the right horn and the antelope with 8 coils on each of its horns represents Asase Afua as it is a symbol of fertility in the Akan religion due to Venus (the sign of Asase Afua) was said to be an eight-rayed star, with possibly cross-divided or divided eye, representing the waxing and waning moon, symbolic of fertility (Asase Afua) and death. The goat also represents (or represented) her due to goats having a procreative and sexual meaning, but it was entirely supplanted by Ta Kora whom either took the goat symbol for himself or shares it with her.

All Akans, no matter if they call Asase Yaa or Afua, recognize that Asase has two personalities; One old and one youthful.

== Asase Yaa/Afua Worship and Taboos ==
There are many ways that Asase Yaa/Afua is worshipped. Here are some of the ways.

=== Goddess of Truth ===
As the upholder of truth, lying is a taboo committed against Asase. When a member of the Akan people wants to prove their credibility, they touch their lips or tongue to the soil of the Earth and recite the Asase Ya Prayer-Poem as evidence of their honesty.

=== Goddess of the Earth, Fertility, Procreation and Farming ===
As the Goddess of the Earth, she is credited as being the nurturer of the earth and is considered to provide sustenance for all. As such she is regularly worshipped so she doesn't withhold her abundance of resources. For the Asante, Bono and most other Akans, Thursday is reserved as Asase's day. On said day these Akan people generally abstain from tilling the land. However, for the Fante and few other Akans, Friday is reserved as Asase's day. On said day, Fante and other Akans generally abstain from tilling the land.

No one is allowed to change or agitate the land without the consent of Asase, which can only be gained by pouring libations to Asase. Serious consequences can befall those who violate this rule. Before planting the person who is going to plant must knock upon the earth as if she was a door.

During a child's outdooring (naming) ceremony, once the child's complete name is bestowed upon the infant, the child is placed on a mat symbolizing thanksgiving to Asase for sustaining its life and for allowing the parents to successfully procreate.

As the aspect of Earth, Asase receives the deceased body for interment.

The colour brown is associated with Asase due to its link to clay (which comes from the earth) and the clay, due to its connection to Asase is seen as a healing and purifying agent in Akan culture.

If a person commits a sexual act in the bush, Asase Yaa must be propitiated.

Before setting up a house, a sacrifice of appeasement is made towards Assase so that the house is protected from evil spirits.

When humans die, their honam and mogya are returned to Asase.

During ayie (funeral rites) libations are poured so Asase can permit the grave of the deceased to be buried.

=== Goddess of Peace ===
Asase is the God of peace, meaning that when there is a murder, war or a way where human blood is intentionally spilt, very substantial sacrifices are needed in order to appease Asase.

=== Mother of the Dead ===
As the Mother of the Dead, she is the one who comes to fetch Akan people's souls to the otherworld (Asamando) at the time of death [cite]. Also, it is with her name that the first offerings are made to the ancestors, due to the fact that the Ancestors are looked over by Asase. During ayie, libations are poured so Asase can accept and protect the person to be buried and to lead them peacefully to Asamando.

=== Libations and reverence towards Asase ===
As the first deity to be created by Nyame, Asase is called in libations immediately after Nyame.

The Akan believe that everyone has the ability to show reverence towards Asase, whether by pouring libations to her or by looking after her (i.e. looking after the world).

Fowls are sacrificed in her name and their blood poured onto the floor, specifically by farmers when they need Asase's permission to plough, plant and harvest.

== Proverbs and Adinkra ==
Here are proverbs linked to Asase:

Asase Ye Duru: lit The Land has weight. This proverb and Adinkra (shown below) symbolizes the providence and the divinity of Mother Earth and this symbol represents the importance of the Earth in sustaining life.

Tumi nyina ne asase: lit All power emanates from Land. This proverb attests to the power of Asase, where anything earthly that has power is part of her power.

Asase ye duru sen epo: lit The Land is much heavier than the Sea. This proverb shows the importance of Asase to the Akan.

Nipa nyina ye Nyame mma, obi nye Asase ba: lit All mankind is Onyame's offspring, no one is the offspring of the Land. This means that spiritually (as far as Sunsum and Kra go) humans are not Asase's children as all sunsum and kra return to Nyame after death.

== Songs and Prayers to Asase ==
Asase Ye Duru is the Adinkra Symbol of Asase Ya the Akan people's Goddess. Asase ye Duru means; The Earth has weight (symbol of providence and the divinity of Mother Earth and this symbol represents the importance of the Earth in sustaining life). The divinity of the Earth. Providence Power/Authority, Wealth and Might. Twi: Tumi nyinaa ne asase (All power emanates from the earth) and Asase ye duru sene epo (The earth is heavier than the sea).

=== Asase Ya Prayer Poem ===
Prayer Poem To Asase Ya
First stanza
Old Woman Earth ....

She who Lent the Rights..
Of Cultivation to the Living ....

My Prayer to You, of Thanksgiving.
Second stanza
"Earth, When I am about to Die,

I Lean on you.
Earth, While I am Alive,

I Depend on You".
Third stanza
Lilacs in your Hair .. Ever Present Mother
In each Grain of Sand is thy Story.
Fourth stanza
Giver of Nkwagye the Salvation of Life

And Nkwa to live Life without Strife

To your Everlasting Glory.
Fifth stanza
That Man is Tame is thy Domain...

Giver of Law and Ethics

Scales of Justice.
Sixth stanza
With Each Field I till..

With Thee I am Still
And when Death comes to Claim..
I become One with thy Fame

Bringing Life to the Land with my Will.
Seventh stanza
The Fertile Fields and the Woman's Yield

All Have felt thy Hand
Hail and Thanks Be Great Mother

For your Back upon which we Stand.
Eight stanza
Upholder of Truth, our Lady Fair

To kiss the dust of thy Breast...

Is proof of the Tale.
Ninth stanza
Hail Great Mother

Whose Love is in the Earth
Thy gifts to your Children

Are an Unending source of Mirth.
Tenth stanza
A Smile to the Lips with a Song in the Heart
Praises we Sing, when the Plantings to Start.
Eleventh stanza
Hail bringer of Life, bringer of Law and Order

Hail Old Mother Earth, your Children
Have Crossed the Border

Into the Lands of Sweetness and Heart.
Twelfth stanza
Asase Yaa, Aberewa, Asase Efua

Names without End do we Call You
Blessed Be, Asase Yaa

To Be Cherished Forever, We Adore You.

=== Poetry to Asase ===
O Mother Earth, who gives birth, who wed the sky,

Who nurtures and sustains all, who gives us life:

While we live, we depend on You; when we die,

We lean on You. You taught us the tiller-knife,

You give us law, order, and truth-seeing eye;

Save you alone we would live in fear and strife.

We press our lips to your bosom, the rich soil,

Ever turn with song and a smile to the holy soil.

=== Short prayer to Asase ===
Into your womb I place the seed of self

To be nurtured in goodness and grown in love.

=== Poetry to Asase Ya and Nana Firimpong ===
Nana Firimpong

once you were here

hoed the earth

and left it for me

green rich ready

with yam shoots, the

tuberous smooth of cassava;

take the blood of the fowl

drink

take the eto, mashed plantain,

that my women have cooked

eat

and be happy

drink

may you rest

for the year has come round

again.

Asase Yaa, You, Mother of Earth,

on whose soil

I have placed my tools

on whose soil

I will hoe

I will work

the year has come round

again;

thirsty mouth of the dust

is ready for water

for seed;

drink

and be happy

eat may you rest

for the year has come round

again.

And may the year

this year of all years

be fruitful

beyond the fruit of your labour:

shoots faithful to tip

juice to stem

leaves to green;

and may the knife

or the cutlass

not cut me;

roots blunt,

shoots break,

green wither,

winds shatter,

damp rot,

hot harmattan

come

drifting in harm

to the crops;

the tunnelling

termites not

raise their red

monuments, graves,

above the blades

of our labour

== Family ==
Asase is the daughter of Nyame, the female aspect of the Nyankapon-Nyame-Odomakoma trinity and the wife to Nyankapon. With him, she has had several children, the most notable being Bosomtwe, Epo, Bia, Ta Kora and possibly Ananse.

Asase Ya's favorite child is most likely Bia (same as Nyame's), as Bia is the Akan God of the Wilderness, and Asase Ya represents the harsh, dry Earth.

== Myths ==
=== Asase is separated from Nyame and the tower to Nyame ===
According to legend, Asase and Nyame were once very close. However a person, either Asase herself or someone else pounds their yam with a pestle either to prepare fufu for their children or just to annoy Nyame. Either way, the pestle routinely bumps against the heaven, hitting Nyame. Annoyed, Nyame separates himself from Asase by turning into his true creator form; Ananse Kokroko (Great Spider) and climbing on a thread to heaven.

In one version of the myth, Asase attempts to reestablish her relationship with Nyame. To do that, she gets many mortars, piling them one on top of the other. In the process, she moves closer and closer to the sky. To reunite with Nyame, she needed just one more mortar. She asks a child to get one for her, but he can find none. In desperation, she tells him to take one of the mortars from the bottom of the pile. He does so, and, when the mortar is removed, the entire tower collapses, forever separating Asase and Nyame.

In another version the woman who pounds her pestle against heaven orders her children to build a tower of mortars, one atop another, right to Nyame. Needing one more mortar, the children took it from the bottom—and the whole tower collapsed, killing many.

In a third version of the myth, Nyame and Asase are so close, humans were squished between them. So man annoyed Nyame with cooking smoke, banging pestles, and slicing off chunks of the sky for the pot until he retreated further away from the Earth.

=== Asase and her magical sword, how Ananse stole it and the plant that cuts people ===
According to myth, Asase had a long, sharp sword that could fight by itself. When she ordered the sword to fight, it slaughtered everyone it encountered. When she commanded the sword to stop fighting, by saying "cool down", it did.

Ananse had fled to his mother, Asase's house. There were one of two reasons for this:

1) Because there was famine in the land, and the only food available was in the storehouse of Nyame. Ananse, in order to become Nyame's agent and sell his food supplies to the people, Ananse agreed to let his head be shaved daily but the shaving was painful, and people made fun of the way he looked.

Or:

2) Because he had tried hiding beans under his hat, but the beans were extremely hot and ended up scalding his head and hair, leading to him becoming mostly bald with a bit of oddly placed hair, where again people made fun of how it looked.

Either way, when Ananse could no longer stand this situation, he stole some food and fled to Asase's house. When he asked the goddess for her protection, she granted it. One day, when Asase left the house, Ananse stole her sword. He returned with it to Nyame and offered to use the sword to protect Nyame whenever he needed help. Nyame accepted Ananse's offer. When an enemy army approached, Anansi ordered the sword to fight. It slew all of the enemy forces. However, Ananse could not remember the command to make the sword stop. With no enemies left to kill, the sword turned on Nyame's army. When only Ananse was left alive, it killed him too. Then it stuck itself into the ground and turned into a plant with leaves so sharp they cut anyone who touched them. The plant still cuts people, because no one has ever given the sword the command to stop.

== The Abosom in the Americas (Jamaica) ==
Worship of Asase was transported via the transatlantic slave trade and was documented to have been practiced by enslaved Akan or Coromantee living in Jamaica. Jamaican slave owners did not believe in Christianity for the Coromantee and left them to their own beliefs. Hence the Akan's spiritual system was dominant on the plantation. According to Jamaican historian and slave owner Edward Long, creole descendants of the Akan coupled with other newly arrived Coromantee joined in observation and worship of the Akan goddess Asase (the English people recorded erroneously as 'Assarci'). They showed their worship by pouring libations and offering up harvested foods. Other Akan Abosom were also reported to be worshipped. This was the only deity spiritual system on the island, as other deities identities in the 18th century were obliterated because of the large population of enslaved Coromantee in Jamaica, according to Edward Long and other historians who observed their slaves.

== See also ==
- Nyame
- Akan religion
- Adinkra
- Amokye
