= Tano (Ta Kora) =

Akan god of the river and thunder

Tano (Tanoɛ), whose true name is Ta Kora (abbreviated from Tano Kora/Akora, not to be confused with Tano Akora) and is known as Tando to the Fante is the Abosom of war and strife in Akan mythology and Abosom of Thunder and Lightning in the Asante mythology of Ghana as well as the Agni mythology of the Ivory Coast. He represents the Tano River, which is located in Ghana. He is regarded as the highest and king of all Obosom. The Tano abosom are his sons in Akan mythology.

== Names and epithets ==
Tano is commonly as Kora, Ta Akora, Tano Kora and/or Tano Akora in the Techiman-Bono area. The name Ta Kora most likely means the “immense father' as “kora” means "the immense" and “ta” may be derived from a word meaning "father", stemming from how he is the father of a majority of the abosom. "Kora" can also mean "to mend", which means the name can also translate to "Tano The Mender” or "Tano The Healer”, referencing his healing abilities. Another name for this deity is ‘’Tano Kwasi’’, although saying the name belongs specifically to Ta Kora may be incorrect, as another atano abosom shares this moniker. He has 4 epithets: Asuhyia Tano' meaning “The Blessed Waters of Tano” (a reference to Tano being a river deity), Nana Ko Nim, meaning “The One Who Wins Wars” (linked to Ta Kora being a war deity), Obomuhene, meaning “King Within The Rock” (as Ta Kora was also identified with the rock promontory from which the river Tano springs) and Tano Okoradie, meaning that he is a saviour and protector, not a destroyer (this is a callback to him despising Owuo as he represents destruction, whilst Ta Kora is a protection abosom).

== Attributes and symbols ==
Ta Kora is represented by the Tano River and the rock promontory in his nature form. Ta Kora has the appearance for a big and strong warrior armed who can change his appearance via shapeshifting, who has several Akrafena, two of which make up his emblem with a sword with two blades fused at the middle, and a legendary gun known as "Kodiawuo", literally meaning to "Go eat and die" or more simply "Pandemic", attributing to Tano's ability to spread illness amongst his enemies. It also has links to its destructive power as the word "Kodiawuo" is used when talking about missiles in the Twi dialect and other such weapons of mass destruction. He also wields Thunder and Lightning due to him being the Abosom of Thunder (although in the case of the Fante, he never was a Thunder Abosom). His day may be Sunday, as said by one of his names, but there is an atano Abosom who has the name Tano Kwesi.

Ta Kora's animalistic symbols are baboons, fish, crocodiles, elephants and goats. Fish are said to be the children of Ta Kora, with him being able to appear as a bearded fish with a double line of cowrie shells on his back with a braided dorsal midrib. The fish's superiority is maintained in the proverbs; it is never referred to irreverently and is not subject to the usual harsh comment or sarcasm. The solemn maxim "From the river whose fish we do not eat, we do not [even] take a [gold] nugget, displaying the extent that the Asante revere the Tano river and Ta Kora. Goats were said to be taken from Asase Ya, and as a nod to Akua Abirekyi, a goat who was the old messenger of Nyame and who helped Tano become the patron Abosom of the Asante by tricking his brother Bia. It is said that his shrine and home is protected by Ta Kora's personal army of baboons, who serve as guards and fight spiritually for humans and the Tano family. Crocodiles are the messengers of Ta Kora. He sends them to deliver news of evil that is about to befall the community. Their presence on land out of the river is an indication. There are times when the crocodiles lie across the roads and streets instead of being in the river. When this happens, the traditional priest propitiates Ta Kora to find out the bad news and ways the society could avert such calamities from happening.

Ta Kora also has several pieces of regalia, including a crown, staffs, large umbrellas with ornamental tops, several Akrafena and precious beads worn henes (kings), as well as a brass pan.

His emblem is made up of stones which are taken from the bed of a river, a sea or a stream. Such stones are heaped in a place where medicinal herbs are grown.

== Character ==
Ta Kora is amongst the most powerful deities in the Akan Pantheon of Abosom, possibly second to that of Onyame and rivialling that of Bobowissi, whom to the Fante is Onyame, meaning that Ta Kora is possibly just as powerful as his father. For this reason, Ta Kora is the patron Abosom of most Akan tribes, specifically those of the north. Unlike other deities of war, like Ares, he is in rivalry with Owuo (Death). Ta Kora is a War deity more like Mars or Athena, as he uses military tactics to defeat his enemies, evident in the Akan military ideology of adaptation.

His most famous tactic is the ‘Captured on purpose’ tactic, in which he would transform himself into a little boy during wars, allow himself to be taken to the enemy kingdom, then spread pestilence among them, leaving them vulnerable to his own armies. He is also a heroic deity, who knows no fear, which is evident in the Akan belief that bravery in battle is honorable, and cowardice punishable by death.

Despite his reputation being the Abosom of war and strife, he is often depicted as merciful as it is said that if a person is a witch and they confess and vow to change, he will forgive them. He will try and find a peaceful solution to war, due to him valuing life (which is the reason why he despises Owuo, who is literal death), but will quickly, effectively and ruthlessly use force against those who don't heed his calls for peace.

However, it is said that when he was younger and due to him being the Absom of Thunder, he often displayed the extent of his power in massive thunderstorms, and even went out of his way to disrespect Nyankapon when it came to him displaying his might, going as far as to directly interfere in Nyankapon's realm of the sky to display his power. He was also very stubborn. He has since become a more peaceful deity, which might display the difference between how some Bonos saw him compared to Asantes due to their patron abosom being either Ntoa or Asase Ya.

== Representation ==
Ta Kora is considered as a river abosom, owing to his representation as Tano River. He is also known as a nature abosom as well as a war abosom, with the latter role taken up in times of conflicts. As with several of his siblings, Ta Kora is known as the father of the Atano Akan divinities, and is the greatest of the abosom whom are not the atano. The Atano (Water/Tano- Abosom) are said to 'descend' from Ta kora and the river Tano. He is a thunder abosom as well, although in Fante mythos, Bobowissi holds that spot. Due to his struggle with Owuo who is a powerful Asante deity, he also became the Asante abosom of war.

== Family ==
According to Asante mythology, Ta Kora is the second son of Nyame, the supreme creator god, and Asase Ya, the earth goddess. It is said that Ta Kora has several siblings: his older twin brother, Bia (who represents Bia River) is the Asante abosom of the wilderness, wild animals and the bush (this is due to Ta Kora cheating him out of his inheritance). In some stories, specifically Agni people stories, Ta Kora is the firstborn twin, and Bia is the younger brother. He also has three younger brothers Bosomtwe (who represents Lake Bosumtwi), Anansi and Apo, Asante Abosom of the Sea. Ta Kora is known for not getting along with his brothers Bia and Bosomtwe. He is said to be married to the abosom Afua Kranka (Also spelt Kanka Afia) and has 30 or so child deities. Two of their children are Oman abosom, abosom of the Techiman-Bono state.

The name Tano is a generic, family name of which all of his descendants bear. Such children who have the name Tano are Tano Kofi, Tano Kwasi, Tano Kwabena and Tano Yaw. He also is said to have an army of Baboons who protect his shrine and household.

== Worship and Shrines ==
=== Shrines ===
Ta Kora has shrines dedicated to him at Tanoboase (a village named after him), the Tano Rock shrine, at Saaman (The Tano Kwadwo shrine), in Tomade and the Tano Abenamu shrine, amongst other places in Ghana. Tano's shrine at the Tano river is the largest of the Atano shrines and contains several pieces of regalia, including a crown, staffs, large umbrellas with ornamental tops, several Akrafena and precious beads worn henes (kings), as well as a brass pan.

=== Prayers ===
The 'Beautiful Prayer' is dedicated to Ta Kora.

=== Music, poems and dance ===
Many Traditional Asante War songs may be also dedicated to Ta Kora, as he is the Akan Abosom of War. The circular dance is dedicated to Ta Kora and invokes him. stating:

All hail.

Yes, Akyena, come along:

Something is happening to me.

Hail the water that found a stopping place.

River god Tano, come along:

Something is happening to your children.

All hail,

Yes, Akyena, come today,

For something is happening to us.

Ta Kora also has a poem dedicated to him. It is actually called "Okwan Atware Asuo" ("The path has crossed the river"), but in the book Ayan: The Poetry of the Atumpan Drums of the Asantehene the poem is called "Tano", named after Ta Kora.

=== Okomfo and Abisa ===
Most, if not all, Asante priests and priestesses will state that the reason they first adopted their profession was because they discovered that they were subject to possession by some spirit influence. They might have been going about their ordinary tasks, but more often were attending some religious ceremony, when suddenly, and without previous warning, they heard ' the voice of Tano ' (or of some other abosom) and fell into a fit or went into a trance.

=== Sacred rituals, lakes and festivals ===
The Tano River is said to be a sacred river, and a woman going through puberty may not cross the River (or any sacred rivers) until she stays in a 'bush' village for six days. Other festivals which include the river Tano are the Odwjra ceremony and in funerals.

Hunters, after a successful hunt, give offerings to goats, who are one of the animals that represent Ta Kora.

There is a bailing ceremony involving fish from the Tano river called "fishing" where the priests bail the river and expose live fish for worship. The bailing ceremony is performed at intervals prescribed by the priests. It consists of the transfer of this messenger of the abosom from one pool to another, with care taken never to let the fish touch ground, which would offend Ta Kora

=== Taboos ===
Menstruation is Ta's taboo, and no women who goes through menstruation is allowed to go near Tano's shrine. Also, due to Tano being guarded by Baboons, eating, killing or even harming baboons is an unforgivable offense and leads to death or great punishment to the person's society. The same rules apply for Crocodiles and any wildlife that lives in or near the Tano river, such as mudfish and antelopes.

During the bailing ceremony, care is taken to never let the fish touch ground, which would offend Ta Kora.

The day of Wednesday is said a taboo day for Ta Kora, possibly due to Owuo's connection to the day and the fact that Wednesday in Akan belief is a day associated with evil. As such on Wednesday and upon Thursday, Ta Kora's temple is closed and no one has access to it.

== Myths ==
Ta Kora has a few myths involving and/or about him. Here are some of the most popular:

=== How Asuo Tano (Ta Kora) was introduced to humans, the first priestess and the founding of the state of Techiman ===
A man called Nana Takyi Fri went out hunting daily to feed himself and his younger sisters after they had settled in a forest. His youngest sister, Afia Ankomah decided to go fishing in the forest, preferring fish to the meat of an animal. When she got to the water banks, she put her fishing basket into the water to catch fish, but when she though that she had caught a fish, she saw that something else had ended up in the basket. Not thinking much of it, she took it out of the basket. But all of a sudden, the place became dark. Every time she put it back into the basket the darkness would go, and every time she took it out of the basket, the darkness would return. As a result, she knew that she'd have to take it home as if she didn't, the place would become dark and she wouldn't be able to retrace her steps home. So she took it home, but asa soon as she reached home, she was possessed by the object. The object, through Afia identified himself to her siblings as the river deity Asuo Tano, for which he was to live with them. He brought Nana Takyi Fri and his family to the place where he dwelled, protected by a horde of baboons. He taught Nana Takyi Fri and his family his laws and rules so they could live with him and his family. Nana Takyi Fri became the hunter for the family, whilst Afia Ankomah (the youngest sister) became the first Priestess for Ta Kora. In time she married Amadu, a Dagomban blacksmith, whose first wife was called Amea Tomfour who came from Sheawu Besease. Nana Takyi Fri pleaded with Amadu to marry his little Priestess sister for the reason to relieve her of her spiritual workload through her nephews and nieces, as Takyi was not interested in helping his sister with her spiritual work. Amadu agreed and he and Afi got married and have a son, whom they called Nana Fosu Aduanwoma. When he came of age, his mother Afia retired all of her spiritual duties to him and he inherited the shrine elements of the Great Tano. After this, Takyi decided to move forward for his plan to find a new settlement. He moved to Tuabodom with Amoafowaa (his sister), leaving his little sister behind. The Great Tano decided to send one of his children called Twumpuro to possess Takyi Ofri. Takyi Fri and Amoafowaa left Takyi Ofri behind after their Priestess sister to help her and her son with their spiritual duties. It was clear that Takyi Fri was trying to avoid his spiritual assignments, something that the Great Tano would not allow. So when Takyi Fri moved to a new settlement in present-day Tachiman, the Great Tano again sent his son Taamensah (Tano Mensah) to possess Takyi Fri's sister Amoafowaa. Takyi Fri finally realised that he couldn't keep running from his spiritual obligations, so he accepted his spiritual obligations and stayed at his settlement, in the process founding the Techiman nation, which means the nation of Takyi.

=== Ta Kora's rivalry with death ===
Ta Kora is associated with a origin of death myth. In this story, it was said that Ta Kora got into a feud with the personification of Owuo, the Akan Abosom of death over a competition to catch up with a hunter. Whoever got to him and was invited for supper first would claim humanity. Ta Kora transformed into an antelope and let the hunter chase him before turning around and assuming his all powerful abosom form again. He tried to set off with the hunter, but Owuo stopped him. The contest details change according to the source, ranging from singing songs of power to fighting. However, the outcome is the same nonetheless—neither won. They reached an agreement – whenever Ta Kora had to visit the human realm or earth, Death will accompany him. In another account, the agreement was different: Whosoever arrived first when a human was sick or wounded, will be able to claim their life. So, if Death came first, that person's life was forfeited, but if Ta Kora showed up instead, they could continue with their life. Regardless of the outcome, it was this struggle with death that Ta Kora became the Asante abosom of war.

=== The division of lands ===
There are two versions of this myth:

==== Asante version ====
When Nyame's sons had come of age, Nyame decided to divide up the lands between his sons: Ta Kora and Bia. It is well known that Nyame had always liked Bia best, as Bia had always been more obedient than Ta Kora, and thus he planned to give the most fertile and well-wooded lands, which is the land of present-day Ghana and eastern Ivory Coast, to Bia. Ta Kora would receive the infertile lands, which are the central and western lands of present-day Ivory Coast. However, this did not come to pass. The messenger goat Akua Abirekyi, who is Nyame's servant, was entrusted to deliver these messages. However, the goat liked Ta Kora better. So, the goat told Ta Kora to go to Nyame very early in the morning disguised as his brother, something very easy to do as Ta Kora was Bia's twin, to fool Nyame which would lead Nyame to give the fertile land to him instead. Akua then went to Bia to tell him of Nyame's message, but said to Bia that there was no need to rush as Nyame was busy. Bia, therefore, took his time, feeling sure that he'd get his just share of his inheritance. Early next morning, Ta Kora dressed up and disguised himself as Bia and went to Nyame. Nyame, mistaking Tano for Bia, gave Tano the fertile lands. When Bia later went to Nyame to collect his fair share of his inheritance, the mistake was discovered, but nothing could be done to reverse it. Ta Kora got the fertile lands of the Asantelands, modern-day Ghana and bits of eastern Ivory Coast, and Bia was stuck with the barren lands of the central and western parts of Ivory Coast. This started a feud between Bia and Ta Kora which extends even to their rivers. As another consequence, Bia was cast into the role of the Asante abosom of the wilderness and the goat is taboo to all worshippers of Tano and Bia.

==== Agni version ====
When Nyame's sons had come of age, Nyame decided to divide up the lands between his sons: Ta Kora and Bia. Nyame had always liked his oldest son Ta Kora best, as he was stronger than Bia, and thus he planned to give the most fertile and well-wooded lands, which is the land of present-day Ghana and eastern Ivory Coast (the Asantelands), to Ta Kora. Bia would receive the infertile lands, which are the central and western lands of present-day Ivory Coast. The messenger goat Akua Abirekyi, who is Nyame's servant, was entrusted to deliver these messages. However, the goat liked Bia better. So, the goat told Bia to go to Nyame very early in the morning disguised as his brother, something very easy to do as Bia was Tano's twin, to fool Nyame which would lead Nyame to give the fertile land to him instead. Akua then went to Tano to tell him of Nyame's message, but said to Tano that there was no need to rush as Nyame was busy. Tano, therefore, took his time, feeling sure that he'd get his just share of his inheritance. Early next morning, Bia dressed up and disguised himself as Tano and went to Nyame. Nyame, mistaking Bia for Tano, gave Bia the fertile lands. When Tano later went to Nyame to collect his fair share of his inheritance, the mistake was discovered. However, when Ta Kora heard about this, he took it into his own hands to forcefully take back what was rightfully his and set off to confront Bia. Bia, knowing of his older brother's immense power, fled westward rather than face the humiliation of inevitable defeat at the hands of Ta Kora. Ta Kora got the fertile lands of the Asantelands, modern-day Ghana and bits of eastern Ivory Coast, and Bia was stuck with the barren lands of the central and western parts of Ivory Coast. This started a feud between Bia and Ta Kora which extends even to their rivers. As another consequence, Bia was cast into the role of the Asante abosom of the wilderness and the goat is taboo to all worshippers of Tano and Bia.

=== The moving of Rivers ===
In this story it is said that Bosomtwe disliked Ta Kora so much, he moved his entire river just to get away from Ta Kora.

=== The Hunter who fetched ones river into another's river ===
Due to Ta Kora cheating Bia out of his inheritance, their rivers (Tano River and Bia River) became mortal enemies and still are to this day. It is said that if you try to fetch one river's water into another, you will die. As the story goes, an Asante hunter did this and for angering Ta Kora and Bia, he was turned into a Palm Tree. It is said that his gun hangs from the branch of the Palm tree. He serves as warning to those foolish enough to fetch either Bia or Ta Kora's river waters into the other's river.

=== Lowering of the Tano river waters ===
The Baule people supposedly lived to the east, and the Anyi were already well established in the area at the time of the Aowin arrival. They never fought the Baule, but while living in Kranchekrom a battle was fought with the Anyi at Sutri, an island in the Tano River south of Jema. The Aowin asked the abosom of the Tano, Ta Kora, for help and, as the story is told, the abosom lowered the river level enough for them to cross and defeat their enemy. From this time on, the island has existed as the main Tano shrine for the Aowin.

=== Asante Gyaman war (1818) ===
According to oral tradition, Asantehene Nana Osei Bonsu sought out the help of Ta Kora to defeat the Gyaman King, Kwadwo Adinkra. Ta Kora requested for a special gun to be crafted. It came to be known as "Kodiawuo" and he told Asantehene that the war with Kwadwo Adinkra would be fought for seven days and on the seventh day, he would see four stars representing Ta Kora and his 3 sons and that on that day, they would go to Gyaman. Ta Kora and his sons turned themselves into little boys by allowing the unsuspecting Palace guards to take them to the Palace of Kwadwo Adinkra. It is believed that Ta Kora and his sons killed all those in the Palace, with Ta Kora shooting Kwadwo Adinkra using Kodiawuo and then Ta Kora and his sons vanished. As a result of Ta Kora's divine intervention, the Asante became victorious after the war.

=== The stubborn hunter ===
A certain stubborn hunter who was not from the Akan arrogantly killed and ate a baboon secretly. He and his family were spiritually attacked by Ta Kora with a mysterious sickness that could not be cured. When his folly was exposed through an oracle by the traditional priest, he was asked to pay 1000 Ghanaian Cedis as monetary fine as well as sacrificial items of four schnapps and two white fowls to appease the deity. This was meant to purify the entire society from being attacked by the deity. However, he and his son who went hunting the baboon died. His wife and his two daughters survived a stroke of their mouths and right arms after their banishment from the community.

=== The 3 arrogant pastors ===
Three pastors of the Christian faith went out to the challenge of the powers of the Tano deity by killing and eating the mud fishes in the Tano River. Ta Kora, greatly angered, killed all 3 pastors.
