= Kalumba =

Supreme god figure of the Luba people in the Democratic Republic of the Congo

- Other names: Sendwe Mwlaba
- Region: Democratic Republic of the Congo
- Ethnic group: Luba people

Kalumba, also known as Sendwe Mwlaba, is the supreme god figure worshipped by the Luba people of the Democratic Republic of Congo.

== Legend ==
According to the creation myth of the Luba religion, Kalumba created the first man, named Kinbaka-Baka, and woman, named Kinbumba-Bumba, to explore the Earth. They informed Kalumba that the Earth was dark and only the Moon existed. So, Kalumba created the Sun to give them light. From that day on, the first man and woman returned with a dog named Kalala Kabwa, birds, a fire-making stone, iron, the power to reproduce for animals, plants, and people, and became the parents of humanity.

In another myth, humans started living on Earth when Kalumba banished them from the heavens when they started fighting one another. They suffered on Earth and wanted to return to heaven, so they built a tower that could reach the heavens. Several people managed to return and tried to inform others on Earth of their success by playing musical instruments. The sound notified Kalumba of what happened, and thus, he destroyed the tower.

In the origin-of-death myth, Kalumba tried to stop the personification of Death from encountering humans by placing a dog and a goat to guard the paths leading to Earth. The guards were supposed only to let the personification of Life pass so that humans could live forever, but both failed. The dog, on the first watch, fell asleep and let Death in, while the goat in charge the next day stopped Life instead.

== See also ==
- List of African mythological figures
