= African traditional religions and other religions =

African Traditional Religions Commonalities with other World Relions

Traditional African religions have shared notable relationships with other religions, cultures, and traditions.

Throughout the history, they are often noted for having one of the oldest presence in the world, and also applauded for their tolerance to other religions.

== Hinduism ==
Like Hinduism, the traditional African religion recognizes the presence of one supreme deity as well as the existence of God in multiple aspects.

Traditional Igbo doctrine of reincarnation and connection to the spiritual mortal identity of the culture, themes about spiritual instrumentality based on the traditional Igobo beliefs and practices with the Hindu mantra, specifically the doctrine in the creative power of the spoken word are identical.

== Christianity ==
God is esteemed by both African religion and Christianity as both the very ground of being and the source of life. Anthropology is the basic starting place for both religions, human beings are the temporal mirrors and mediators (imago Dei) of God in the feature world.

According to Thaddeus Metz and Motsamai Molefe, traditional African religions are monotheistic, as they center around the belief in a single, supreme God who is the creator and sustainer of the universe. This God is regarded as the ultimate source of life and being, similar to the monotheistic understanding found in other major world religions.

The Christian idea of church has similarities with African traditional life in which brotherhood and the extended family play a central role. The Church is the Christian family, in which all are accompanied to one another through belief and baptism in Jesus Christ. The Church also combines those who have died and those who still live. This is parallel view to the African view of the family of both the living and the omitted.

== Islam ==
African traditional religion is often regarded to have influenced African Islam and vice versa. Islam has been in Africa for so long and has become so acculturated to the African landscape that some scholars have argued that it is a traditional African religion.

Conversions to Islam were generally pacific and gradual in nature and heavily incorporated pre-Islamic rituals and beliefs. Beliefs in local myths, spirits and magic often remained intact and was even approved if it didn't compromise the preeminence of Allah. Many African peoples often equated their remote high god with Allah. The continuation and active participation of Muslims in traditional masking events, the maintenance of local shrines (Islamic and pre-Islamic), and other rituals is common throughout Africa.

Traditional African religion still has notable traces throughout most of Africa. Followers of traditional African religions in Muslim dominated areas can be found, adhering to their beliefs, rituals, magic, medicines. Generally they have adopted the Muslim way of dressing but in matter of deeper subjects such as life, birth, marriage, death, they remain the followers of African religion.

== Buddhism ==
Relations of African religion with Buddhism dates back to 17th century. After the establishment of the Dutch settlement at Cape Agulhas, some Buddhists paid short, coincidental visits to the Cape Agulhas - such as the few Thai monks who were aboard the Portuguese ship which ran aground off.

Like Hinduism, Akan tradition shares belief in reincarnation with Buddhism.

== Bibliography ==
- African traditional religion and Christianity in a changing world: issues in comparative religion by Joseph S. Gbenda, 1997
- African Traditional Religion in South Africa: An Annotated Bibliography by David Chidester
