= Akan religion =

Traditional religious beliefs and practices of the Akan people

Adinkra symbol representing the omnipotence and omnipresence of Nyame

Akan religion comprises the traditional beliefs and religious practices of the Akan people of Ghana and eastern Ivory Coast. Akan religion is referred to as Akom. Although most Akan people have identified as Christians since the early 20th century, Akan religion remains practiced by some and is often syncretized with Christianity. The Akan have many subgroups (including the Fanti, Ashanti, the Akuapem, the Wassa, the Abron, the Anyi, and the Baoulé, among others), so the religion varies greatly by region and subgroup. Similar to other traditional religions of West and Central Africa such as West African Vodun, Yoruba religion, or Odinani, Akan cosmology consists of a senior god who generally does not interact with humans and many gods who assist humans.

Anansi the spider is a folk hero who is prominent in Akan folktales where he is depicted as a wise trickster. In other aspects of Akan spirituality, Anansi is also sometimes considered both a trickster and a deity associated with wisdom, responsible for creating the first inanimate humans, according to the scholar Anthony Ephirim-Donkor. This is similar to Legba, who is also both a trickster and a deity in West African Vodun.

== Deities ==
=== Creator God ===
Followers of Akan spirituality believe in a supreme god who created the universe. He is distant and does not interact with humans.

The creator god takes on different names depending upon the region of worship, including Nyame, Nyankopon, Brekyirihunuade ("Almighty"), Odomankoma ("infinite inventor"), Ɔbɔadeɛ ("creator") and Anansi Kokuroko ("the great designer" or "the great spider"). There is no concept of a trinity in Akan religion, like in Christianity, but rather the veneration of the Creator, Mother Earth and the ancestors besides the abosom.

The supreme creator is an omniscient, omnipotent god called Nyame. Asase Yaa (also known as Mother Earth), is second to the creator. Together they brought forth four children: Bia, Epo, Bosomtwe and Tano. The Creator is connected to Saturdays and Saturday-borns, while Asase Yaa (Mother Earth) is connected to Thursdays and Thursday-borns and hence, revered by farmers on Thursdays.

=== Abosom ===
The abosom, or the lower deities or spirits, assist humans on earth. These are akin to orishas in Yoruba religion, the vodun in West African Vodun and its derivatives (such as Lwa in Haitian Vodun). Abosom receive their power from the creator god and are most often connected to the world as it appears in its natural state. Priests serve individual abosom and act as mediators between the abosom and humankind. Many of those who believe in these traditions participate in daily prayer, which includes the pouring of libations as an offering to both the ancestors who are buried under the land and to the spirits who are everywhere. Such abosom are also believed to give health, fertility, prosperity, protection from witches and other needs to those who have established communication with them.

The abosom were divided into three groups; the atano (gods from water bodies such as rivers, led by Tano), ewim (sky gods) and the abo (gods from the mountains). The ewim were considered to be judgemental and merciless, while the abo were sources of healing and medicine. They also have different realms in Asoro (the realm of the gods). In some versions, the gods are instead split into nsuobosom (gods of lakes, rivers and water), bosomboo (gods of rocks and mountains), and wurabosom (gods of trees and forests).

As Nyame’s children (Nyame mma), however, it was also believed that the abosom were sent to serve humans, and therefore were eager to be ‘born’ into human society. By this domestication they became fie abosom, ‘housegods’ for the Akan believers, and part of the ordered world of humans. In the domestication process, a god in wild nature was ‘born’ in human society by him acquiring five additional forms of materiality and visibility, human or man-made, of a more occasional and pragmatic kind. A god was believed to retain them, in addition its ‘materiality’ in wild nature as water, rock or forest, for as long as he was believed to be incorporated in human society.

However, it is sometimes believed that the mother of the abosom is Bosompo, the primordial goddess of the sea, who came after Abo, Nyame, and Asase Yaa.

An abosom in untamed nature was believed to manifest its intention to enter human society and to attach itself to a matrilineage by coming down upon (si so) a human being, often driving him or her for some weeks into the deep forest. His or her ‘strange’ behaviour set processes of divination in train that caused a community to recognise that ‘mad’ person as an elect of a new god who needed to be trained in order that he or she might serve as that god’s okomfo, priest-medium.

They may also do this through a man - made shrine or tabernacle, usually a yawa, brass pan, consecrated as more narrowly the temporal abode of a god, at which the god could be addressed. It contained various things from untamed nature: soil, herbs, roots, creepers and leaves from the forest and from under water, and most often also a stone (obo), often taken from a body of water (nsuo), and a nugget of virgin gold, and beads. It was covered with a piece of white calico, and sprinkled with hyirew, white clay dug from the bottom of certain water courses. At a yawa, a god, it was believed, could be addressed and propitiated, or honoured, with libations, gifts of food, and animal sacrifice. Male akomfoo went into possession trance by carrying the shrine (yawa) of their god on their heads and were thought to be ‘possessed’ for as long as they carried it. Once a year, the shrine of a god was taken in procession to the river for ritual cleansing.

There was a bosombuw, small temple, or bosomdan, ‘room of the god(s)’, in which the shrines were kept. The rituals of propitiation and possession usually took place in them, or in front of them. The temples are usually situated in the ntiantia, or kurotia, the transitional area between a town (the cultured domain of humans) and the forest (wild nature as the undomesticated domain of the gods). The power of abosom could also be harnessed through asuman, charms or amulets, which they can dwell in.

'However, Akan believers also felt that housegods never became thoroughly and completely integrated in human society by the domestication process by which they ‘born’ into it. They did not become subservient to humans by it nor fully reliable sources of help. They felt that even domesticated gods remained outsiders, at the margins of human society. They remained intensely linked, after domestication, to their original material form and habitat in wild nature. That persistent link with wild nature caused them to be regarded as ehu: fearful, awe-inspiring, unpredictable, fickle and at times spiteful and vengeful. Their ambiguous position in the margin of human society was apparent in several ways. Gods drove a newly possessed person into a wild, deep and at first speechless trance, and often into the deep forest, that is into an ambiguous relation with untamed nature and its ‘inhabitants’: gods, mmoatia, Sasabonsam, potent suman and nnuru, potentially beneficent as well as destructive, some of which, it was feared, might also be in league with abayifo, ‘witches’. And it took a training of the okomfo for several years before the god became a marginal part of human society. Akomfo exhibited this marginality in their unkempt (mpesempese) hair, in the raffia skirt (odoso) they wore during possession rituals, and in their celibate, yet reputedly promiscuous lifestyle. The content of the shrine also expressed that the home of the gods was really outside human habitation, in wild nature, as did the location of the temple in the marginal ntia-ntia area. Ambiguity also prevailed in the allusive, vague manner in which in divination answers to questions asked were given. Asuman and nnuru were believed to be powerful by being composed from parts of sasammoa, animals, plants, roots, etc., that were deemed to be endowed with sasa, the strong but irascible, and therefore dangerous power of revenge. That sasa-power again manifested that they and gods were wild nature rather than cultural order.'

Abosom are often associated with antelopes. One gold weight depicts a half antelope, half man figure, with his antelope half representing the abosom, and his man half the king or individual who channels the abosom on New Year's Day.

=== List of Aboosom ===
Tano (Ta Kora) - head of the abosom, specifically the atano, personification of the Tano River, god of war, strife and lightning, and seen as a royal god of Techiman. Child of Nyame and Asase Yaa.

Afua Kranka (Also spelt Kanka Afia) - wife of Tano, abosom associated with conquest and victory in war.

Bia - personification of the Bia River, Tano's brother, god of barren land, the wild, and bushes, ruler over the 'barren lands' of the Ivory Coast.

Epo - god of the ocean, son of Nyame and Asase Yaa.

Bosomtwe - personification of Lake Bosomtwe, antelope god and through union with an old woman who lived beside his lake fathered Twe Adolo, founder of a clan living beside Lake Bosomtwe.

Osrane - Moon god, son/creation of Nyame, watches over children as they play at night, father of the stars due to his marriage to Kyekye.

Owia - Sun god, who oversees the settling of disputes, creation/son of Nyame, Osrane's brother.

Esum - Personification of darkness/night time, associated with criminals, son/creation of Nyame, brother of Osrane and Owia.

Anansi - a folk hero usually represented as a spider. God of wisdom, cunning and stories, and in some stories the son of Nyame and Asase Yaa.

Owuo - abosom of and personification of death, creator of the malicious whirlwind spirits of the Harmattan and enemy of Tano (Ta Kora).

Abrani - Atano patron of executioners

Kobena Ayensu - Personification of the Ayensu River, older brother of Densu.

Birim - Personification of the Birim River, middle sister of Ayensu and Densu.

Yaw Densu - Personification of the Densu River, Ayensu's younger brother, described as hairy.

Abena Mansa - Goddess of the ocean and the treasures of the sea, believed to have been given the gold Ayensu stole from Densu's birth right for safekeeping, explaining why the ocean is filled with treasures.

Asubonten - A son of Tano (Ta Kora)

Agya Kweku - Patron abosom of witch - hunters

Antoa Nyamaa - A river god and avenging spirit, known for enacting vengeance on any cursed in his name.

Sakrabundu - An abosom associated with antelopes.

Penkye Otu - An abosom associated with antelopes, consulted for divination using red, black and white balls.

Amii - A mouse abosom worshipped in Tanoboase. Worshipped in Tanoboase, a village in Techiman.

Okraman - Giver of fire to early humans, represented as a dog.

Tutu Abo - An Akwamu war god. His name translates to 'stone thrower', and he is likely an abo or bosomboo deity, as he is a rock deity.

Bosommuru - A python deity associated with reproduction and fertility. It is believed that he was sent by Nyame to teach humans how to reproduce, and he sprayed water upon their bellies with the words kus, kus, and then ordered them to return home and lie together.

Oyene Mma - 'She who nurses young children'. Girls and women who had committed minor offences could come to her small statue before they were caught and say 'Mother, save me!' and be forgiven for their offence with a sacrifice. Barren women would also come to her and pray for children.

Kyekye - Wife of Osrane and mother of the stars. She is personification of the Evening Star and enjoys her marriage with Osrane - one proverb states, 'Kyekye pe waree' meaning 'Kyekye loves (her) marriage', and she is represented alongside her husband in the adinkra symbol Osrane ne Nsoromma.

=== Nsamanfo ===
The Nsamanfo are the ancestors.

== Creation myth ==
According to Akan oral tradition, the first being was Nyame, who created Asase Yaa to be his wife. Asase Yaa later created the deity Abo, the primordial cluster of stones. Later, Bosompo appeared, and married Abo, giving birth to the primordial abosom. Some abosom decided to inhabit the corporeal world, becoming landmarks like lakes and mountains, while others inhabited the spiritual realm. Nyame and Asase Yaa went on to have other children, such as Bia, Tano, Epo, and Anansi.

== In the Americas ==
=== Jamaica ===
According to Long, Akan (then referred to as "Coromantee") culture obliterated any other African customs and incoming non-Akan Africans had to submit to the culture of the majority Akan population in Jamaica, much like a foreigner learning migrating to a foreign country. Other than Ananse stories, Akan religion made a huge impact. The Akan pantheon of gods referred to as Abosom in Akan were documented. Enslaved Akan would praise Nyankopong (erroneously written by the British as Accompong, not related to the Maroon leader Accompong [Akan: Akyeampon]); libations would be poured to Asase Yaa (erroneously written as 'Assarci') and Epo the sea god. Bonsam was referred to as the god of evil. Kumfu (from the word Akom the name of the Akan spiritual system) was documented as Myal and originally only found in books, while the term Kumfu is still used by Jamaican Maroons. The priest of Kumfu was called a Kumfu-man.

The Jamaican Maroon spirit-possession language, a creolized form of Akan, is used in religious ceremonies of some Jamaican Maroons.

==== Myal and Revival ====
Kumfu evolved into Revival, a syncretic Christian sect. Kumfu followers gravitated to the American Revival of 1800 Seventh Day Adventist movement because it observed Saturday as god's day of rest. This was a shared aboriginal belief of the Akan people as this too was the day that the Akan god, Nyame rested after creating the earth. Jamaicans that were aware of their Ashanti past while wanting to keep hidden, mixed their Kumfu spirituality with the American Adventists to create Jamaican Revival in 1860. Revival has two sects: 60 order (or Zion Revival, the order of the heavens) and 61 order (or Pocomania, the order of the earth). 60 order worships God and spirits of air or the heavens on a Saturday and considers itself to be the more 'clean' sect. 61 order more deals with spirits of the earth. This division of Kumfu clearly shows the dichotomy of Nyame and Asase Yaa's relationship, Nyame representing air and has his 60 order'; Asase Yaa having her 61 order of the earth. Also the Ashanti funerary/war colours: red and black have the same meaning in Revival of vengeance. Other Ashanti elements include the use of swords and rings as means to guard the spirit from spiritual attack. The Asantehene like the Mother Woman of Revival, has special two swords used to protect himself from witchcraft called an Akrafena or soul sword and a Bosomfena or spirit sword.

=== Suriname ===
Winti is an Afro-Surinamese religion which is largely derived from both Akom and Vodun with Vodun gods such as Loco, Ayizu and so on.

=== Haiti ===
Haitian Vodou is a syncretic religion that combines Vodun with several other African religions in addition to influences from Catholicism. Here latent influences of Akan beliefs can be seen in the incorporation of Anansi as one of the Lwa worshiped in the Haitian religion. He is often depicted as maintaining the connection between the living and their deceased ancestors.

== See also ==
- Momome

== Sources/further reading ==
- Olson, James Stuart (1996). The peoples of Africa: an ethnohistorical dictionary. Santa Barbara, CA: Greenwood Press. p. 18. ISBN 978-0-313-27918-8.
- Sykes, Egerton; Kendall, Alan (2001). Who's who in non-classical mythology. Routledge. ISBN 978-0-415-26040-4.
- Forde, Cyril Daryll (1954), African Worlds: Studies in the Cosmological Ideas and Social Values of African Peoples, James Currey Publishers, ISBN 9780852552810
- Lynch, Patricia Ann (2010), African Mythology, A to Z, Infobase Publishing, ISBN 9781438131337
- Ephirim-Donkor, Anthony. African Personality and Spirituality: The Role of Abosom and Human Essence. Lexington Books, 2015 ISBN 978-1498521222
- Opokuwaa, Nana Akua Kyerewaa. (2005-01-01). The Quest for Spiritual Transformation: Introduction to Traditional Akan Religion, Rituals and Practices. iUniverse. ISBN 9780595350711
- Coyle Rosen, Lauren. Law in Light: Priestesses, Priests, and the Revitalization of Akan Spirituality in the United States and Ghana. University of California Press, 2024. ISBN 978-0-520-39708-8
