= Origin of death =

Theme in the myths of many cultures

The origin of death is a theme in the myths of many cultures. Death is a universal feature of human life, so stories about its origin appear to be universal in human cultures. As such it is a type of origin myth, a myth that describes the origin of some feature of the natural or social world. No one type of these myths is universal, but each region has its own characteristic types. Such myths have therefore been a frequent topic of study in the field of comparative mythology.

== Africa ==
Pervasively in the myths of African cultures, in the beginning there was no death. This can be because a supreme being makes people young again when they grow old; people die but go to heaven to live. In some stories eternal life is lost through some flaw (such as greed, curiosity, stubbornness or arrogance), or as a punishment for disobedience, or as the result of human indifference. Other themes are the failure of a message to be delivered to humans, or a severing of the link between heaven and Earth. Sometimes it is as a result of an accident. Death here is also treated as a beginning of a new journey.

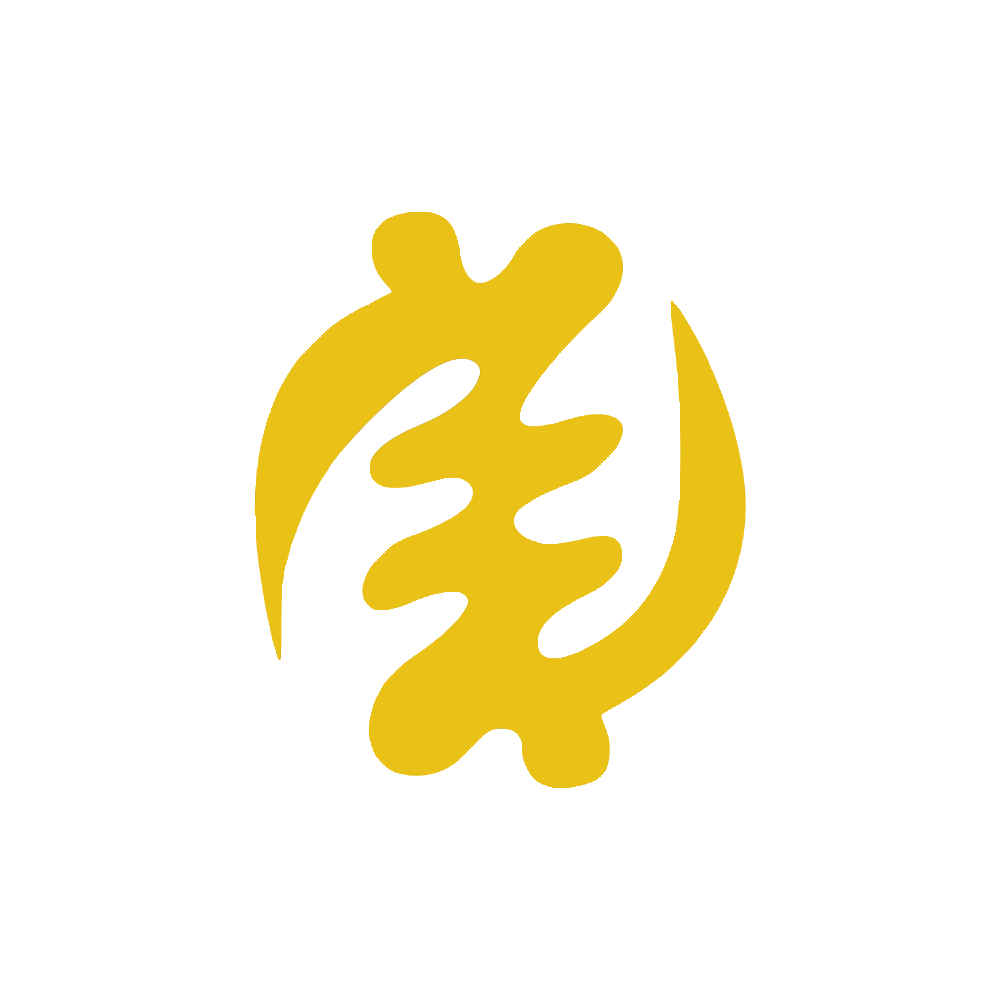
A visual symbol originating from the Akan people representative of concepts, events, and philosophical ideas.

=== Asante ===
In Asante mythology, death came to humanity as a result of Tano being unable to best Owuo (the Asante embodiment of death) in a series of contests to claim a hunter, and the same for Owuo. The two came to an agreement. If a human, specifically a warrior, was dying Tano and Owuo would race to them in an attempt to claim their souls. If Tano got there first, the person would not die. However, if Owuo got there first the person would die. The Asante consider death to be a natural phenomenon therefore there are no exceptions. Death is thus the ultimate destination for all of the living. When it happens to the young it is attributed to foul play. Owuo's birthday is on Wednesday and because of this those born on Wednesdays are said to be tied to this force.

=== Krachi ===
According to Krachi traditional stories, death came to humanity as a result of a young Krachi boy pouring reviving medicine into the eye of a dead Owuo (the Asante god of death). Owuo had been killed for a boy who had cannibalised three people and the townspeople resolved to kill Owuo by setting his long hair ablaze. In his hair was a reviving medicine, which the boy and the townspeople used to revive the three people by splashing it on their bones. Feeling sorry for Owuo, because Owuo had been kind to him, the boy poured the medicine into Owuo's eye, reviving it. Now the eye winks, and every time the eye of Owuo winks, someone dies.

== North America ==
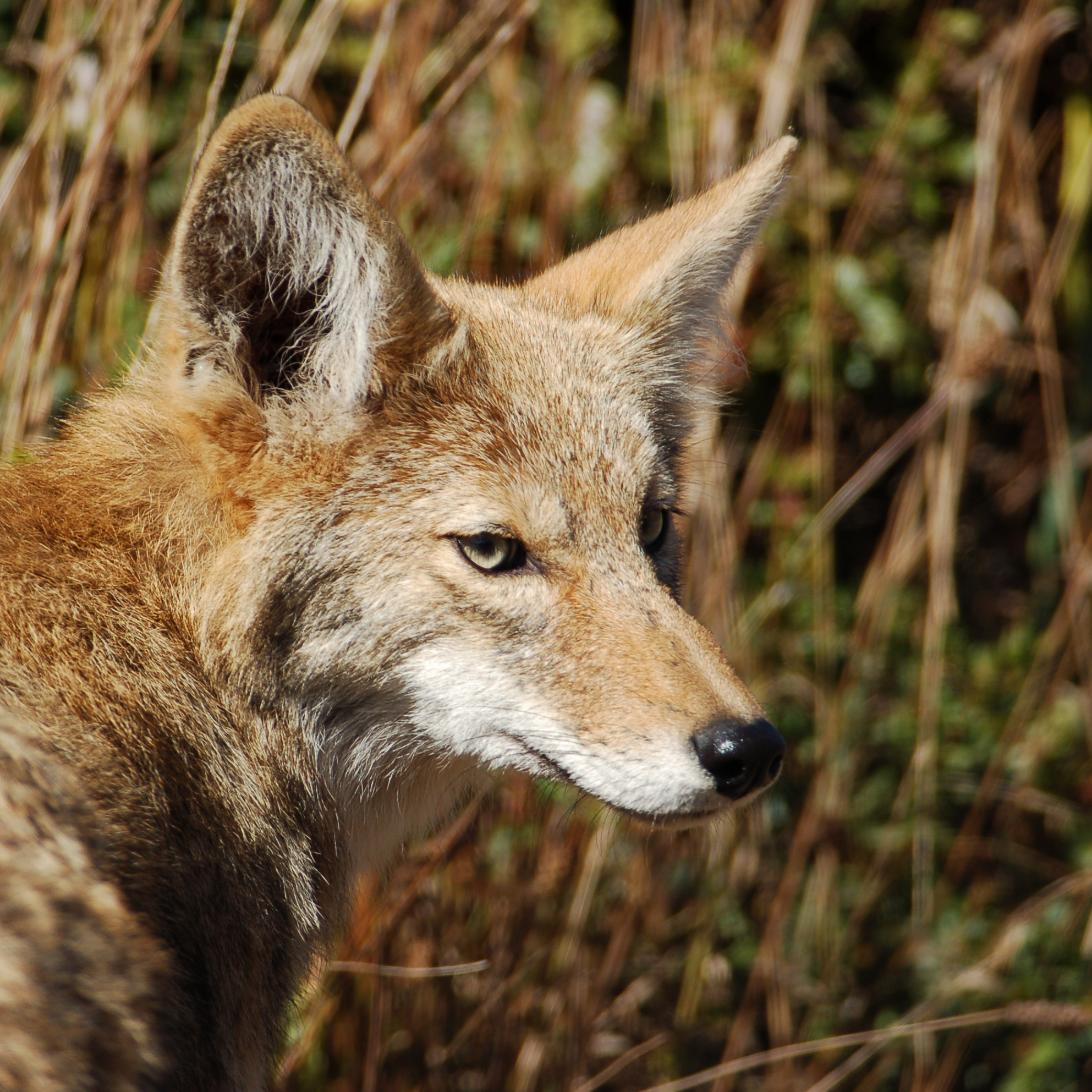
Coyote—a common trickster figure in North American myths

The origin of death is a common theme in Native American mythology. The myths of the plateau tribes blame its origin on the interference of the trickster figure Coyote. The Chiricahua Apache myth also blames Coyote. The plains tribes ascribe it to the result of unfavorable chance. For example, in the Blackfeet account, Old Man and Old Woman arguing over whether people should die, with Old Woman using magic to ensure that the sign that they agreed upon gave her desired result.

Among the native peoples of the Western United States, a common explanation of death was that it was the result of a debate between two people or animals in which one would favour death and the other immortality. For example, the story of the Thompson Indians was that Raven wanted death as there would otherwise be too many men. Coyote preferred sleep to death but was outvoted by Crow, Fly and Maggot, who sided with Raven. Raven's daughter was then the first to die and so Raven wanted to reverse his choice. But Coyote, the trickster, said that the decision was now irrevocable.

== Oceania ==
In Oceania, the most common myth is that originally people had the power to rejuvenate themselves by shedding their skin like a snake. However, when somebody, usually an old woman, does this, she frightens her grandchildren, who cry until she resumes her old skin, an act which mandates death for future generations.

=== Polynesia ===
In Polynesian mythology, death is the result of the hero Māui being swallowed up by Hine-nui-te-pō or Night. If he had escaped, mankind would be immortal, however one of the birds that accompanied him burst out laughing, awakening Hine-nui-te-po who crushed Māui to death, ending hopes of immortality with him.

== Western civilization ==
=== Christianity ===
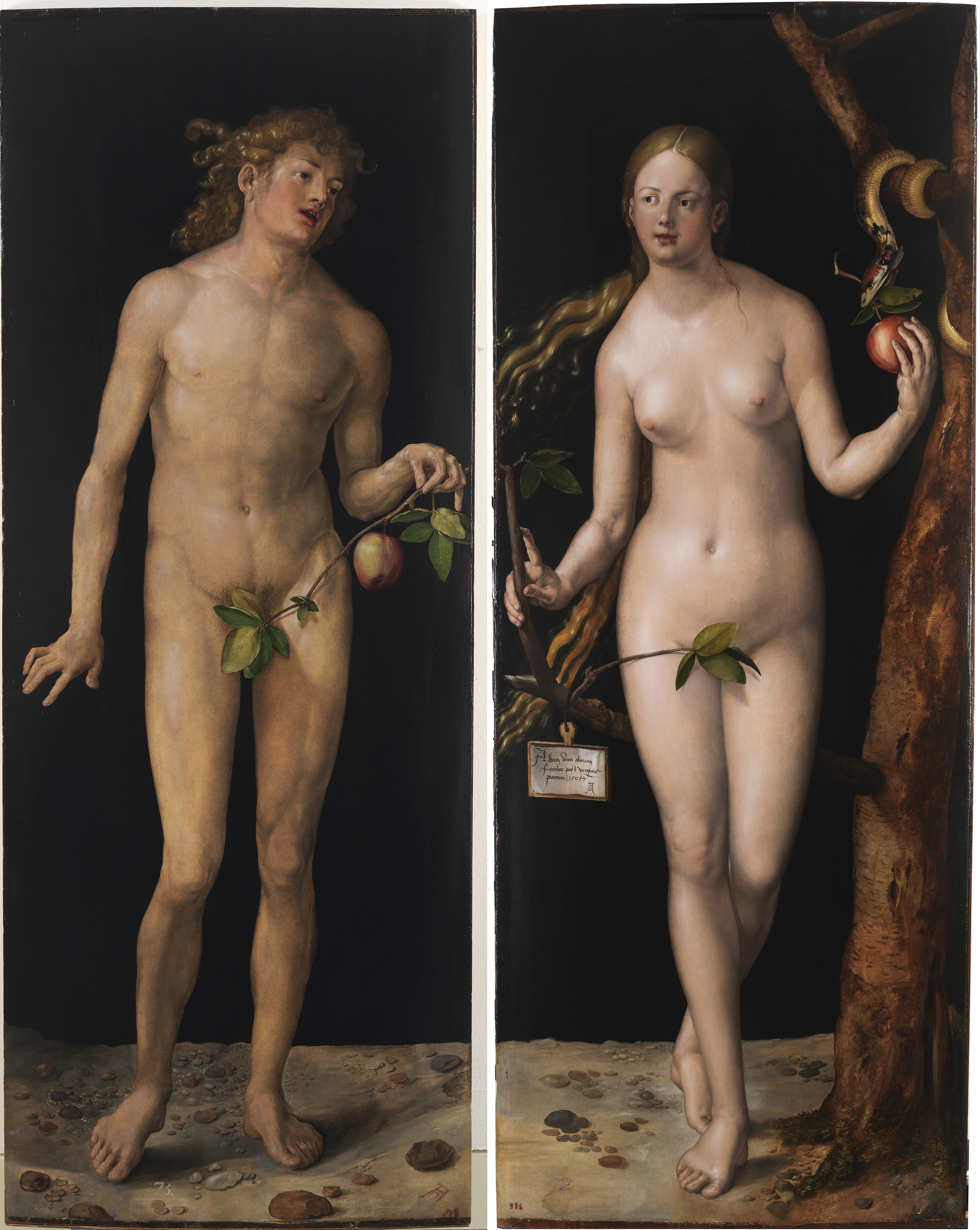
Adam and Eve by Albrecht Dürer

According to Christianity, death is a consequence of the fall of man from a prior state of innocence, as described in the Book of Genesis.

=== Greek mythology ===
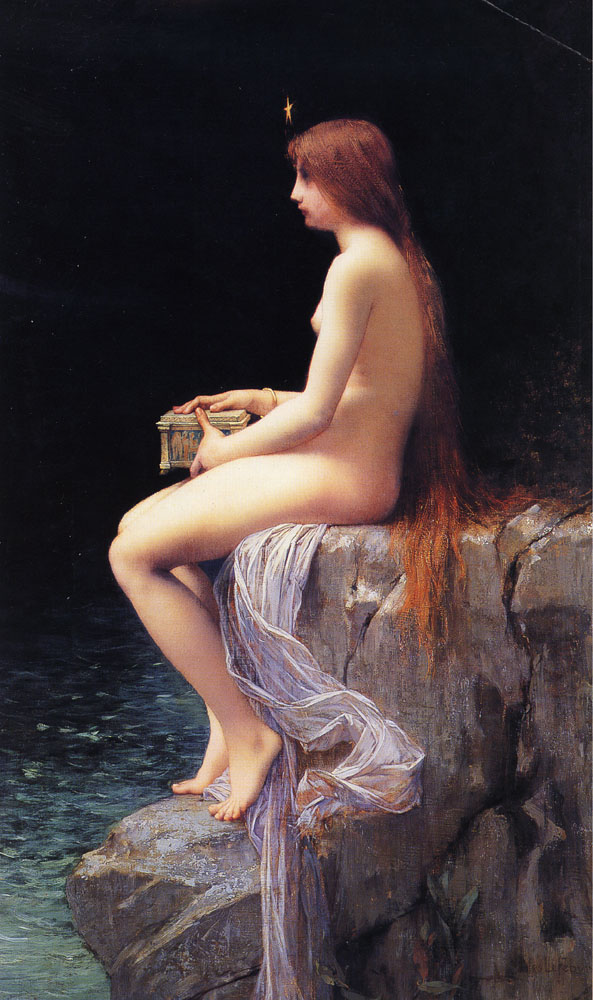
Pandora by Lefebvre

In an early Greek myth, death is a consequence of the disagreement between Zeus and Prometheus. As a result of this quarrel, Zeus creates woman, in the form of Pandora and presents her to Prometheus' brother Epimetheus, with death being one of the results of his opening of Pandora's box, which she brought with her.

== Deities of death ==
Such myths of death and the end have brought to life gods/goddesses that guide a person to their death. In some religions there are deities that even control when an individual will die. For example, in Greek mythology the goddess who has control over an individual's death would be Atropos (known as the one who cuts the thread of life). In a modern sense, the most common deity of death is the Grim Reaper.

== See also ==
- Archetypal literary criticism
- Death and culture
- Epic of Gilgamesh
- Immortality
- Mythology
