= Aby Lagoon =

Lake on the Ghanaian/Ivory Coast border

- Lagune Aby (French)
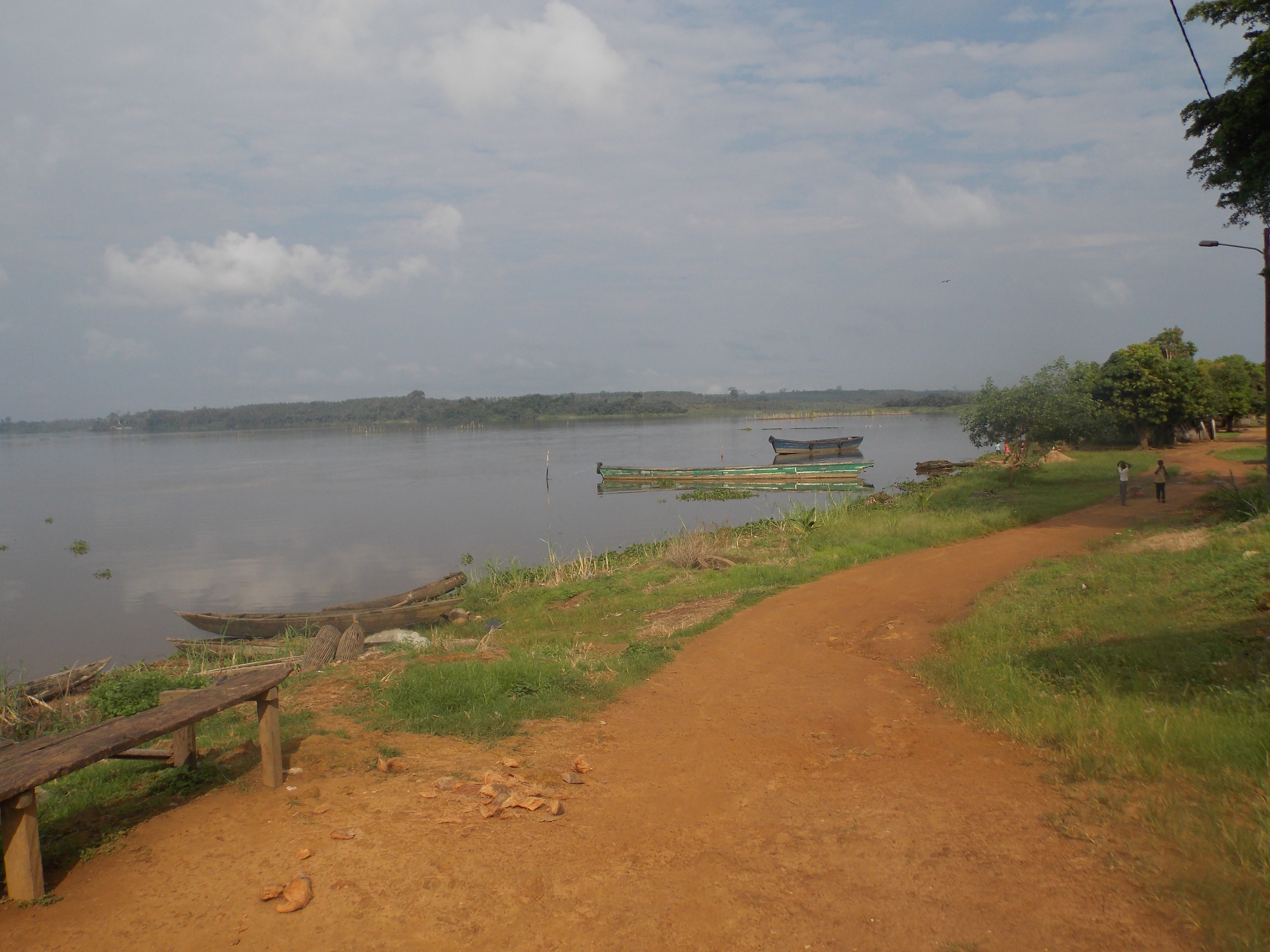
- Aby Lagoon

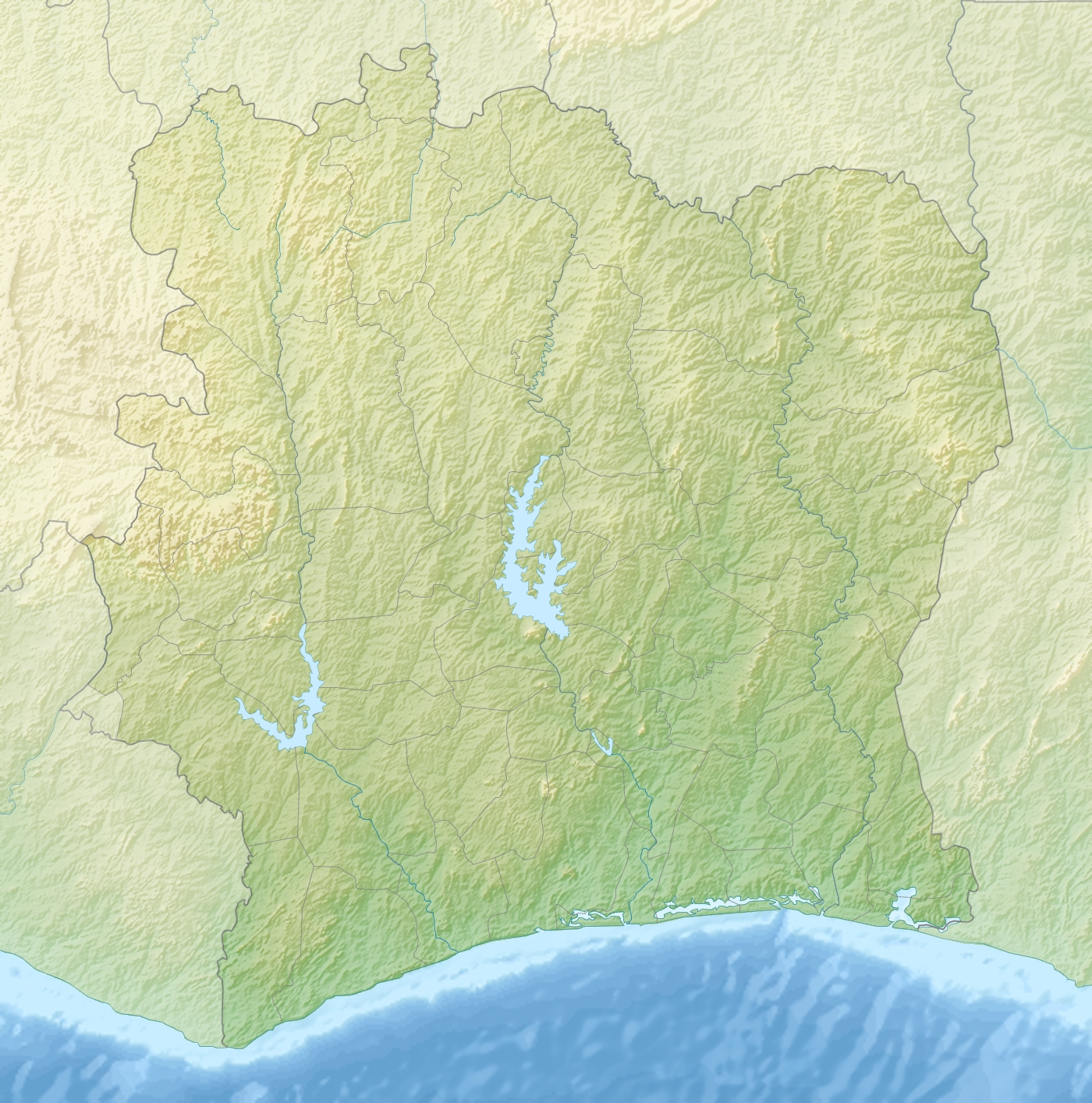
- Location within Ivory Coast
- Location: southeast Ivory Coast, southwest Ghana
- Coordinates: 5.254°N 3.232°W
- Type: Choked lagoon
- Primary inflows: Bia River, Tano River
- Primary outflows: Atlantic Ocean
- Catchment area: 27,650 km^{2} (10,680 sq mi)
- Basin countries: Ivory Coast, Ghana
- Surface area: 424 km^{2} (164 sq mi)
- Average depth: 3.5 m (11 ft)
- Max. depth: 17 m (56 ft)
- Water volume: 1.57 km^{3} (0.38 cu mi)
- Islands: Ehotilé Islands (Esso, Ngramaïna, Nanobaka)
- Settlements: Adiaké, Assinie-Mafia, Eboué, Etuéboué, Nouamou, Tiapoum

The Aby Lagoon complex is the second largest lagoon in Ivory Coast, after Ébrié Lagoon. As a whole, the lagoon has an area of 424 km^{2} (164 sq mi), a mean depth of 3.5 m (11 ft), and a volume of 1.57 km^{3} (0.38 cu mi). It drains into the Atlantic Ocean through shallow channels between the Ehotilé Islands that converge at Assinie-Mafia, where Assoindé Lagoon also connects from the west. Assoindé Lagoon connects the Aby Lagoon complex to Ébrié Lagoon through the Assinie Canal.

The Aby Lagoon complex comprises three named sections: from west to east, they are the Aby Lagoon proper, Tendo Lagoon, and Ehy Lagoon. Covering 305 km^{2} (118 sq mi), the main Aby Lagoon is the largest of the three sections, extending 24.5 kilometres (15.2 mi) north from the mouth of the complex and having a maximum width of 15.5 km (9.6 mi) and a mean depth of 4.2 m (14 ft). On its southeastern side, the Tendo Lagoon forms an arm 3–5 km (1.9–3.1 mi) wide that extends 22 km (14 mi) east and covers 74 km^{2} (29 sq mi); it is divided between Ivory Coast in the north and Ghana in the south. Located in Ivory Coast, Ehy Lagoon extends northeast from the eastern end of Tendo Lagoon, covering 45 km^{2} (17 sq mi). A subsidiary lagoon known as Univaye Lagoon is located in Ghana and drains into Tendo Lagoon from the east.

The Bia River feeds the main Aby Lagoon from the north, while the Tano River discharges into Tendo Lagoon from the east. These two rivers combine to drain an area of 27,650 km^{2} (10,680 sq mi).

The climate in the area features two rainy seasons (May to July; October to November) and two dry seasons (August to September; December to April). The annual rainfall is about 2,000 mm (79 in). Salinity in the lagoon varies with rainfall and peaks in March and April. The southern part of the main Aby Lagoon has the highest salinity, while the areas near the mouths of the Bia and Tano remain fresh throughout the year.

Agriculture and fishing are the main economic activities around the lagoon. Ethmalosa fimbriata accounts for 60% to 80% of the fish catch in the lagoon. The main crops in the surrounding area are coconut, oil palm, banana, cocoa and coffee.

The Ehotilé Islands are protected as Îles Ehotilés National Park, established in 1974 on the initiative of the local communities. They also form part of the Ramsar site of Iles Ehotilé-Essouman, which covers 272.74 km^{2} (105.31 sq mi) of the lagoon and surrounding areas.
