= Gye Nyame (Adinkra) =

Ghanaian symbols that represent concepts or aphorisms

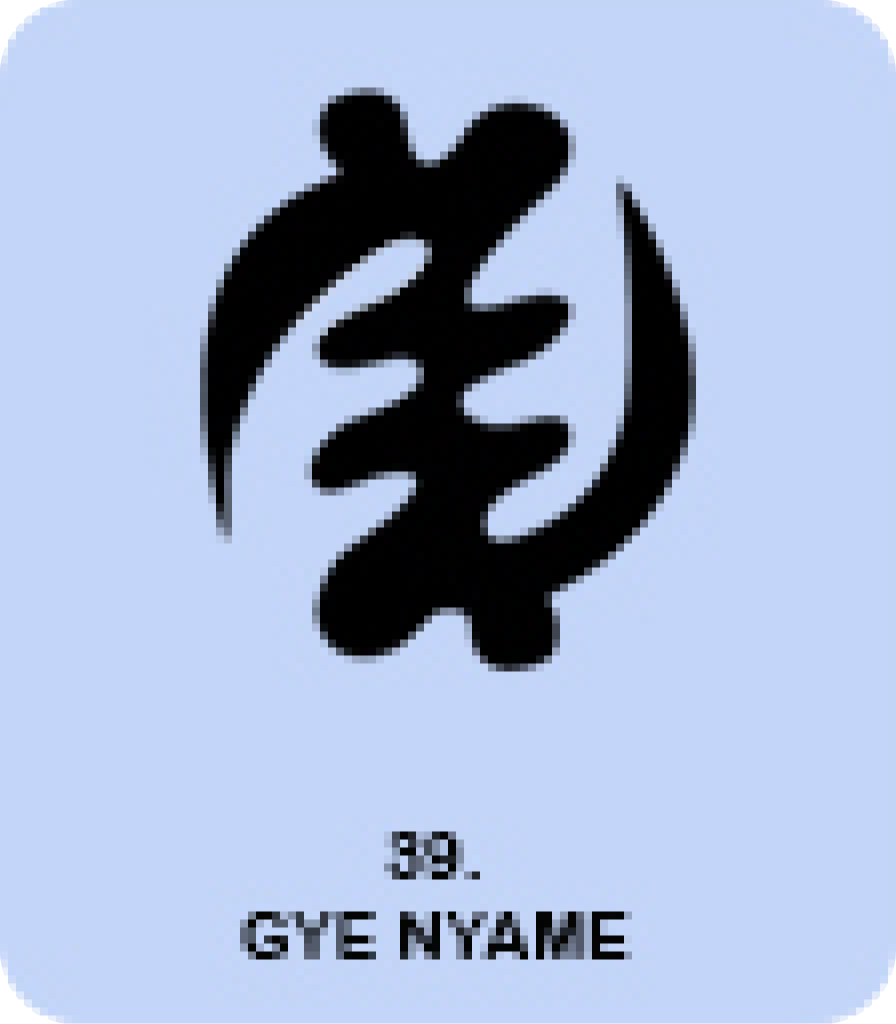
Gye nyame (Adinkra)

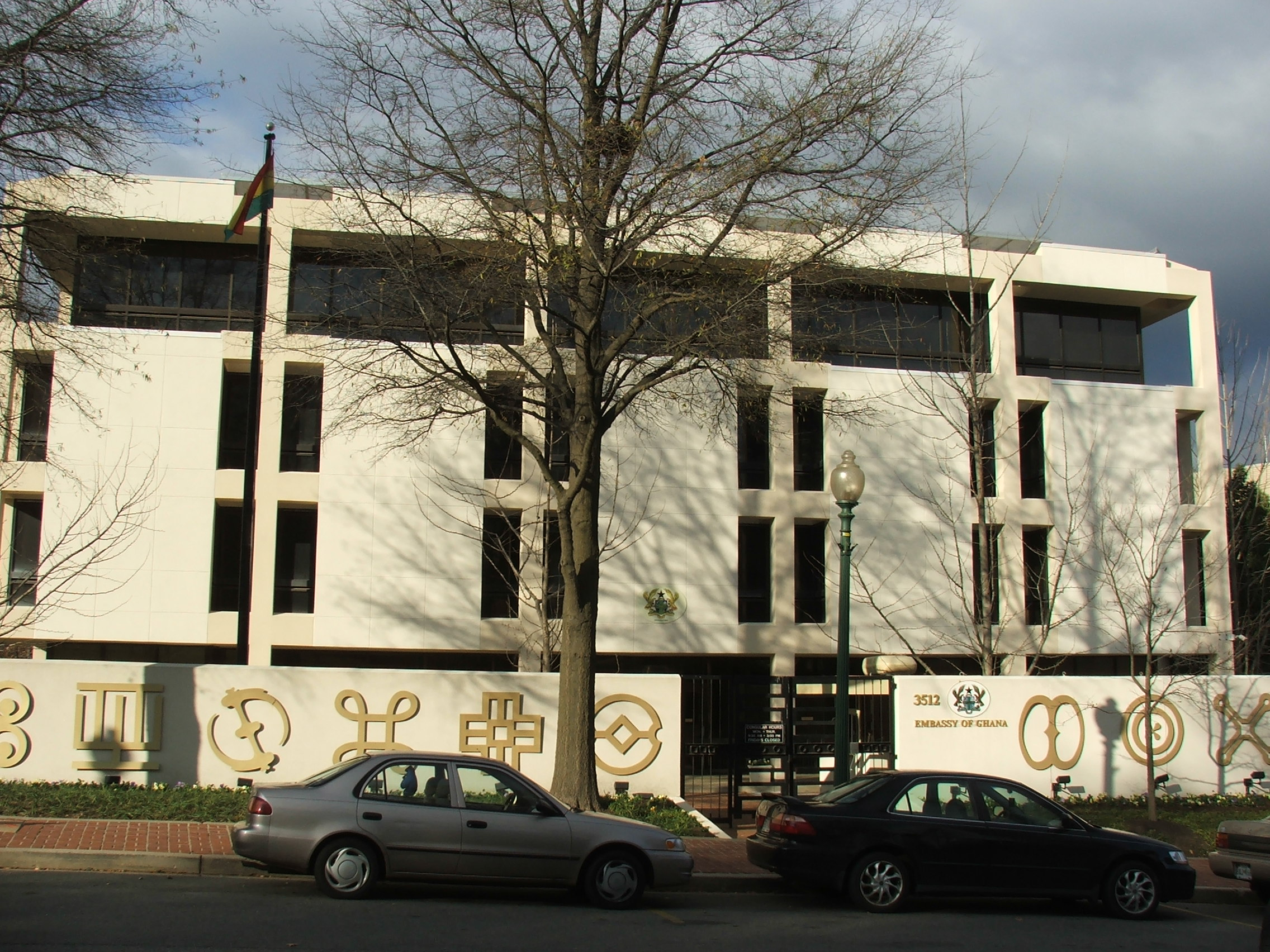
Ghanaian Embassy WashingtonDC 3220

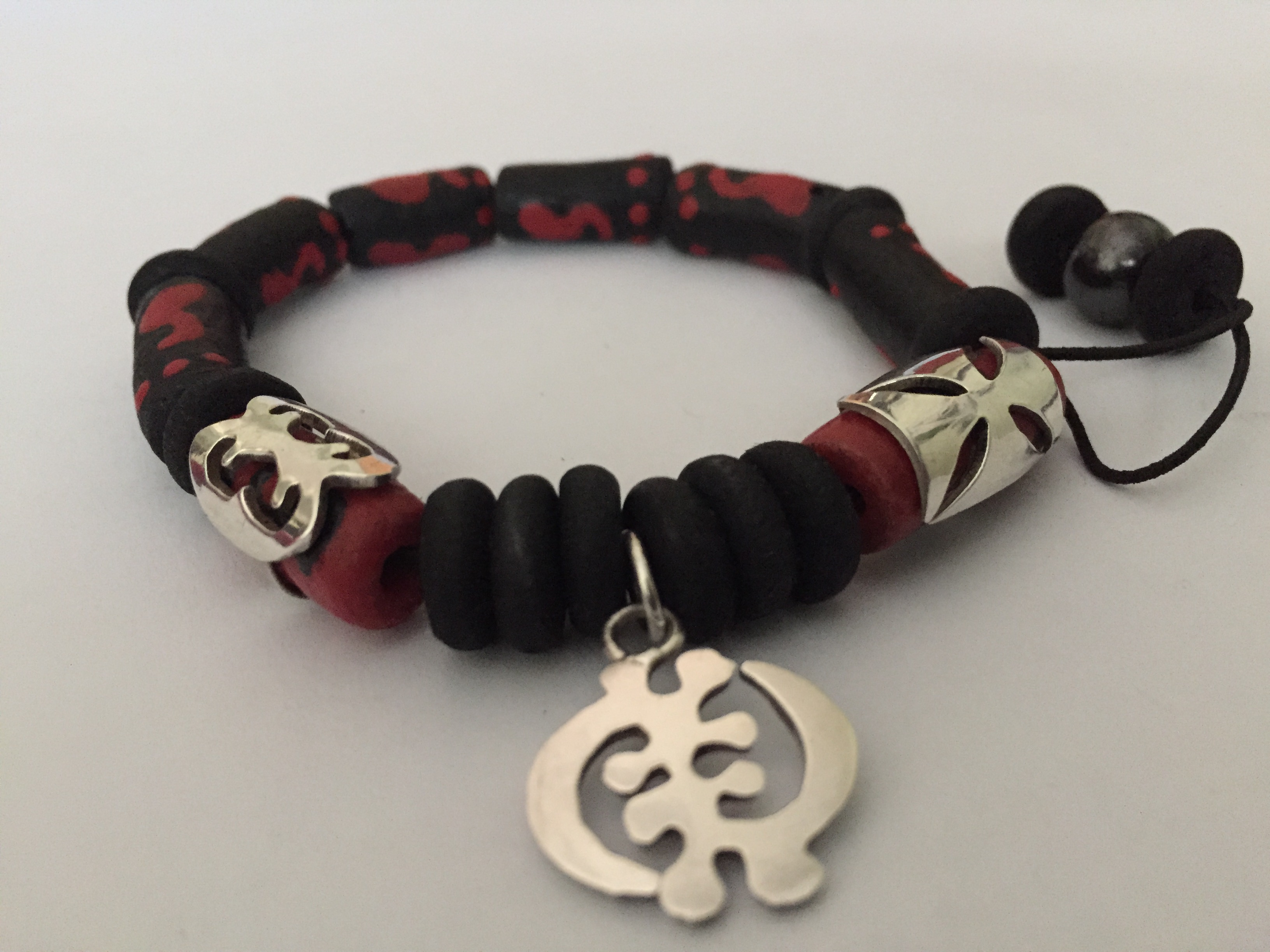
GyeNyame3

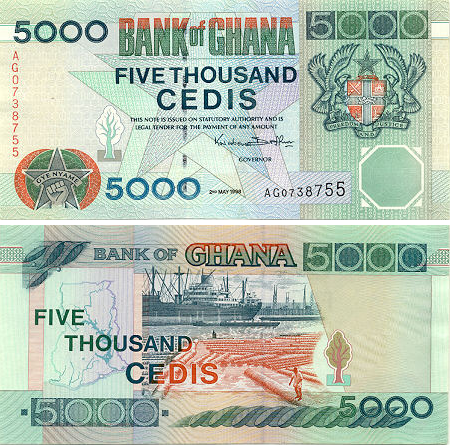
5000 cedis (1994)

Gye Nyame is one of the Adinkra symbols of the Akan people of Ghana. It is translated into English literally as 'Except God' or 'Except for God' where the Akan name for God - nyame is used.

== Meaning ==
Gye Nyame, according to the Akan belief, is interpreted as the belief of the existence of an omnipotent supreme deity that is to be revered above all others. Other interpretations of this symbol speak to a belief of a supreme deity that existed before creation who would continue to exist after everything no longer exists. This second interpretation speaks to the cultivation of humility in the human race.

== Use ==
Gye Nyame as an Adinkra symbol is considered one of the widely used Adinkra symbols in the Ghanaian culture and government. It is a part of the symbols found on the wall of the Ghanaian embassy in Washington DC, United States. It is also found as one of the security features of the 200 ghana cedi note - highest denomination of the Ghanaian currency issued by the Bank of Ghana as official Ghanaian currency in 2019. It is also used widely in the design of textiles, jewelry, decorations and artwork. It was included as one of the Adinkra symbols on the attire of John Mahama, worn for his swearing-in ceremony as president of Ghana in 2025. It also was used in the design of a carved stool presented to Queen Elizabeth II, Queen of the United Kingdom.

The phrase Gye Nyame is also widely used in the Ghanaian context. The phrase is seen on the 50, 200, 100, 500 and 5000 cedis notes issued by the Bank of Ghana as official Ghanaian currency between 1972 and 1994. It is also used as the name of a gas field located 60 km offshore Takoradi in the Western region of Ghana.
