= Antoa =

Coordinates: 6°45′N 1°31′W

- Interactive map of Antoa
- Country: Ghana
- Region: Ashanti Region

Antoa is a town in the Ashanti Region of Ghana. The town is known for the Antoa Secondary School. The school is a second-cycle institution. This is also where the deity River Antoa Nyama is found.
