= Owuo =

Akan and Krachi (Ewe) Abosom of Death and Destruction

Owuo is the abosom of Death in the Asante and Akan mythology of West Ghana and the Ewe, specifically the Krachi tribe of East Ghana and Togo. He is represented with the Adinkra symbol of a ladder. It is said that he was created by Odomankoma (could also be spelt Odomankama) just so he could kill humans (although, specifically for the Asante and Akan retelling, this attribute comes later during an altercation with Ta Kora, hinting that he might've been created before humans) and possibly other deities, such as Odomankoma himself. He signifies the termination of the creative process in the world, a reference to him killing Odomankoma, the Great Creator.

== Names ==
Owuo is also known as Odomakama Owuo', or the Destroyer (or the Death of Creation), due to his destructive nature of killing mortal life and the fact that he killed Odomankoma, causing Odomankoma to then get resurrected and then live through Nyankopon:

Onyankopon onye Odumankoma sunsum ' (literally 'Nyankopon is Odumankoma's personality )

Odomankoma would later poison him in an effort to kill him, although it did not work.

Another name for Owuo is Owuo Papa, or the Death fan who blows the "uncertain ones" back into the other world of Samando, the Akan spirit realm and is the generator of whirlwinds inhabited by hostile spirits. In Asante mythos, it is said that when Death has no particular place to go and kill, he will return to Samando

Owuo, like many Akan deities, also has a day name, which is Owuo Kwaaku (Death born on Wednesday). This explains Owuo's personality, as those born on Wednesday are said to be full of nsem bone (tricks, bad and acts of evil). This means that Owuo is involved in all forms of death, even the most evil kinds.

In Jamaica, Owuo is possibly known as Bredda Death, specifically in the story involving Death (possibly him) and Ananse. This symbolises the fact that in Akan culture and mythos, where Jamaican culture heavily takes from, Ananse is actually the brother of Death via Odomankoma.

== Personality ==
In Akan depictions, Owuo is a truly sadistic figure who kills without a second thought or care. His first act after being created was to kill his creator and in other tellings of the story he even tried to kill all 3 supreme beings.

It is so driven to desire destruction, whilst it is blind, even hearing the voice of a person it has missed in his acts of cullings stating that they are alone after killing one close to the victim will drive it to try and finish its job of completing its job of destruction. Hence is why the proverb "Owuo a akum wo ena ne wo agya wo ho a, wunnye din se, 'Aka me nko'"; "When Death which has killed your mother and your father is there (with you again), you do not say to him, 'I alone remain'".

He is also described as inevitable and unrelenting. It is said that when he has come for your family and has killed your mother and father, it is best to weep an acceptance that you will also accompany your parents to go with Owuo instead of saying you are alone (as he will then hear and try and kill you). Owuo also does not listen to begging; any attempt to supplicate it when it comes for you, calling it "Mother" or "Father", will fail: it will kill you regardless. Between a human wanting you to do some work and Owuo wanting you to do some work, Owuo will always see you first. Even an attempt to distract Owuo when it overtakes a person to go for another person is ill-advised; it will likely kill both the former and the latter person

He is also said to be indestructible. He also tried to claim humanity in an attempt to strike fear into the hearts of people. While not succeeding in his primary task, he did succeed in his secondary goal. He is also greatly associated with evil. Any form of death is brought about by him and it is said that he often blows all kinds of sunsum from Samando, from good sunsum to evil sunsum. Obayifo (Witches) and Obansam (Wizards) and other evil beings such as the Asanbonsam follow him.

For all of his negative connotations, he cannot be bribed and actually despises money, displayed by the proverb 'Owuo mpɛ sika' (Death doesn't like money). Despite this, it is said Owuo can open the boxes and chests of all, even the stingiest of misers. Owuo also avoids killing slaves and those of lower standings. Hence, a tactic Asante parents did in the past was add the prefix 'Ko (Nko, coming from the word Donko meaning "slave" in twi) to the names of their children to try and cheat death and trick into believing a person is a donko and thus avoiding trying to kill them first. As for those of higher ranks and royals, it is said to have been absurd and even criminal to couple the name of a royal and Owuo, even in the same sentence. Hence, euphemisms such as saying that "A royal has gone to cast away salt", "They have gone to Samando", "They have gone elsewhere" and "They have become property of Nyankapon" are used to convey that a royal has passed on

Due to his birth being on a Wednesday, his personality is the personification of evil, to the point that he might also be the Abosom of Bonsam (Abosom of Evil) or one of his followers, or even children the Abosom of Evil. Due to his personality and how it opposes Ta Kora's personality, the two despise one another.

In Krachi depictions, Owuo's personality shifts to a kinder tone. He takes care of a boy who asked for his help and feeds him to make sure he remains alive. However, what he fed the boy was human meat, and Owuo killed the two people the boy sent to take his place. Owuo's murderous tendencies in Krachi representation are most likely caused by his taste for human flesh, which he craves. The taste for human flesh can spread to any who has extensively eaten human flesh, with even the boy having a craving for the meat up until when he realized that it was actually human meat he was eating.

In Jamaican depictions which possibly reference Owuo, Death is a silent figure, seldom speaking unless he needs to. However, it changes if oneself invites themselves into his house. From there he stops at nothing to hunt you down to kill and eat you, and only you, as seen when Ananse's family literally fall into his clutches and he refuses to eat any of them, waiting only for Ananse. Despite is gaunt and incredibly old appearance, he is very fast and very strong. This personality of death is similar to that of the Akan.

== Representation ==
Owuo has two main representations, which are how the Asante represent him and how the Krachi represent him. There is also a third which is how Jamaicans see him based on the Asante description.

=== General and other representations ===
The most widely recognised and the depiction that most likely the Krachi depiction is presented as a monstrous giant with one eye (like that of a cyclops) and a near-naked appearance, save for the large amount of hair that covers his body. He also has long, straight (usually white) hair, which is his second most highlighted feature and is said to extend over many miles, from Krachi to Salaga. It is so big and long that the hair can hold items in it. He has the tusks of a warthog or elephant, and the build of a giant gorilla. His skin colour and/or his fur is red, which is usually symbolic of death in Africa. He may also be depicted as one giant eye. He is a cannibalistic giant who feeds on human flesh and is said to have the power to kill humans by just blinking his eye.

Owuo's other depiction (the Asante depiction) is that of mostly a skeleton who wields an Adare that can kill many with a single slash. With it, it was able to kill the Great Creator in the Akan religion, part of the Nyame-Nyankapon-Odomankoma trinity, with Odomankoma said to have become part of Nyankapon's sunsum. He also holds the ladder, Owuo Atwedee, which souls climb on death. Due to its mostly skeletal appearance, it is actually blind as it has no eyes. However, it has ears so is said to have very good hearing. It is unclear if he is a cannibal in this interpretation.

His eye is his most distinguishable feature outside of the Asante, even in the Jamaican story where Death has both his eyes. It is by Ananse blinding him using flour that he evades death. In the Asante depiction, it is Owuo's lack of eyes, presence of ears on its skeletal body, ladder, and that are its most distinguishable features.

He is an extremely powerful deity in the Akan religion, able to fight Ta Kora to a standstill and even kill the great creator for a time in Akan mythology and is involved in every death in both Akan mythos and (believed) in real life. He is one of Ta Kora's rivals and is his main one in terms of life and death.

He is also represented by whirlwinds.

He also is naturally gifted with an extremely potent venom called Death's venom (Owuo Aduro), which can kill anything mortal and even those immortal.

Only three beings have resisted Owuo. Nyankapon by defeating Owuo in battle and feeding Owuo his own poison (in great part to Odomankoma, whom Owuo killed, becoming the sunsum of Nyankapon), Ta Kora by battling, singing and dancing Owuo to a standstill and Ananse, who used his webs and his quick wit to evade death.

Asante Representation

Owuo is represented by the adinkra symbol of a ladder "Owuo atwedee baakofoo mforo"a proverb meaning "Death’s ladder is not climbed by just one person."

Owuo is regarded as a figure associated with death, and standard practices discourage speaking of death or solitude following a bereavement to avoid drawing his attention. He is visually impaired and locates individuals through sound.

He is also depicted as a mostly skeletal figure armed with an Adare, that can kill many in just one slash, and holds a ladder, Owuo Atwedee. Owuo is blind due it having no eyes (it is mostly a skeleton), but does have ears, so has very good hearing. It also has a key that can open the chests and boxes of all.

Ivory horns were also represented as Death due to the sound that is made when they are blown on^{[4]} (they may also represent Owuo via his tusks, as Owuo is depicted as having tusks, and the Ivory horns are made out of elephant tusks). For this, they are often blown at executions and funerals, but not exclusively.^{[4]} They are often decorated with human jawbones. Owuo is also represented as an executioner, although Abrani is the Asante deity of executioners.

Owuo resides in Samando when it is not killing humans and has no particular place to go.

No matter the form Owuo takes, Owuo is Owuo; Death is death.

A person dies in Akan mythos and in life when Owuo cuts down with his Adare or if the human is an Asante soldier when Owuo races Ta Kora to reach the soul of the dying.

Krachi (Ewe) Representation

In the Krachi representation, Owuo has all of the same physical attributes as the first depiction mentioned in the general representation (see above). It is most likely that the most widely recognized depiction of Owuo, or even the idea of Owuo himself traditionally comes from the Krachi people, although in the days of the Asante Empire, the area that the Krachi people originate from was controlled by the Asante and, before that, most likely the Akwamu Empire, so Owuo could've traditionally been an Akan abosom who was adopted by the Krachi due to the culture of the Asante Empire. This would explain the reason why Death has always been called by is Akan name, Owuo, and never an Ewe name.

Unlike the Asante, who fear Owuo, the Krachi do not depict it as a malicious creature.

Jamaican Representation

Here, Owuo's appearance is based very much on that of the Akan description, specifically for his speed, power and cannibalistic tendencies. This is probably due to the story he is in most likely coming from the Asante. He has both eyes intact and is human in appearance. He is so skinny, he would look exactly like a skeleton if not the fact he has skin. He has a deep, raspy voice when he talks. He has 37 and a half teeth.

== Myths ==
=== The creation of Owuo and how Owuo killed Odomankoma ===
In the Asante proverb, it is said that: "Odomankoma bo Owuo na Owuo kum no". This proverb means "Odomankoma (The Creator in Asante mythos) created Death (only) for Death to kill him". This proverb represents how Owuo was the final creation of Odomankoma, as it would be with Owuo's creation that the creator died, thus bringing an end to creation and showing how Owuo is the death of creation

=== Myths involving Owuo ===
Owuo also has a few myths involving and/or about him, specifically linking to the Origin of Death, which differ from one person to another. Here are some about him linked to each people, but all link together:

=== Asante version ===
==== Owuo's rivalry with war ====
In one story, it was said that Ta Kora got into a feud with the personification of Owuo, the Akan Abosom of death over a competition to catch up with a hunter. Whoever got to him and was invited for supper first would claim humanity. Ta Kora transformed into an antelope and let the hunter chase him before turning around and assuming his mighty abosom form again. He tried to set off with the hunter, but Owuo stopped him. The details of this story change according to the source, ranging from singing to fighting. However, the outcome is the same nonetheless – neither won. They reached an agreement that whenever Ta Kora had to visit the human realm or earth Owuo will accompany him, symbolizing how with war, death comes. In another account, the agreement was different: whosoever arrived first when a human was sick or wounded, specifically in war, will be able to claim their life. So, if Owuo came first, that person's life was forfeited, but if Ta Kora showed up instead, they could continue with their life.

=== Krachi version ===
==== When his eye shuts, a man dies ====
It is said that a male Krachi youth encountered Owuo during his travels. At the time, famine was widespread – and the boy was also afflicted by it. When the boy first met Owuo, he was uncertain of his welcome. But Owuo did not attack him – he instead asked the boy what he wanted from Owuo. The boy asked Owuo for food, and the giant granted his wish. However, he asked for a favour in return – the boy must serve Owuo for some time. The boy agreed and Owuo fed him meat, and from then on the boy started becoming Owuo's servant. After a while, the boy started to miss his hometown. So, he requested a leave from his duties. Owuo eventually acquiesced, with one caveat: The boy must leave another boy in his place. He did as Owuo commanded and left his brother in his stead while he stayed in his hometown for a short holiday. Some time passed, and the boy started missing the meat that Owuo fed him. Thus, he left his hometown once more and returned to Owuo. Owuo welcomed him back and allowed the boy to eat his meat – as long as he started serving Owuo again. Once more, the boy wanted to have a quick visit home. Owuo agreed, as long as the boy prepared him a human wife before he left. So, the boy gave Owuo his sister and left her and a maid while he returned to his hometown. Again, the boy decided to come back to Owuo because he missed the meat. And Owuo accepted him back this time as well, with the same condition: That the boy continues to serve him. However, this time, the boy had a look inside the storage room where Owuo put his meat. Here, he discovered that the meat that he had been eating came from the corpses of his brother, sister, and the maid that accompanied her. In horror, the boy fled back to his hometown and told the people what happened. The people decided to kill the giant by burning his hair. Like lighting a TNT fuse, the fire which started from the ends of his hair quickly travelled to Owuo's head. As the giant fell, the boy realized that a vial of medicine was hidden in his hair. He took it, and as he poured it all over the corpses of his brother, sister, and his sister's maid, they returned to life. The boy also poured the medicine on Owuo's eyes – he did not come back to life, but his eyes continued to blink. From then on, whenever Owuo closed his eyes, a person shall die.

=== Koromante version ===
==== Ananse, Bredda Death and why spiders are found on ceilings ====
Once upon a time, Ananse was walking through the bush when he encountered a very old man, who looked like skin and dry bones, sitting outside his house. Ananse greeted him and asked him if he could have a some water from the man. Ananse asked him this question twice, each time met with the old man's silence. Ananse then asked if he could enter the old man's house to help himself to the water. Taking the old man's silence for a yes, Ananse went into the old man's house and not only helped himself to the water, but as much food as he could eat. Ananse then went outside to the old man, who had not moved from his spot, and thanked him for his hospitality and left. Depending on the source, Ananse either did this to the old man for one more day or for a week.

The day after this (wherever the day source specifies after Ananse's first trip), Ananse took his eldest daughter with him to give her as a wife to the old man, marrying the two on the spot (again to the silence and unresponsiveness of the old man, who was now the son-in-law of Ananse). Ananse then once again took his fill of food from the old man and left. The next day Ananse again went to the old man's house to eat his food again. However, when he arrived and called for his daughter she did not answer. Searching all around the house, he found that she was no where in sight. He went to the old man (who had remained unmoved and as silent as ever since the first day Ananse had come to his house) and demanded to know where his daughter was, grabbing the old man by the collar.

Finally, the old man spoke in a deep, rapsy voice, slowly asking if Ananse knew who he was. Ananse stated that he was his son-in-law. The old man laughed, stating that he was Bredda Death, and berated Ananse for daring to enter his house. He revealed the fate of Ananse's daughter (he ate her) and told Ananse that he would share the same fate.

Despite Death grabbing Ananse, Ananse escaped his grip and ran, believing he could outrun Death. This section of the tale being the origin of the Jamaican proverb: You cannot catch Kwaku, only his shirt. However, whenever Ananse turned around, Death was gaining upon him. Finally, out of desperation, Ananse climbed up a tree. By doing this be barely escaped Death for that moment and learn that Death could not climb. Death tried to throw several objects at Ananse to knock him down, all missing Ananse. Whilst looking around for another object to throw at Ananse, Ananse jumped down the tree and ran all the way to his house.

He grabbed his wife, Aso, and his 4 remaining children, 2 sons and 2 daughters, and climbed on the ceiling with them, all of them clinging onto a wooden beam just as Death rushed into Ananse's house. Death then calmly picked up a burlap bag, got a chair and sat down on it underneath the spider family. However, after around half an hour of this, and Ananse's youngest son became tired. Despite his fathers pleas for him to hang on longer and all of the boy's strength, he fell into the clutches of Death. Death, only wanting Ananse at that moment, shoved Ananse's youngest son into the burlap bag. Soon after, one of Ananse's daughters fell tired and fell to the same fate her younger brother had succumbed to. Then Ananse's other daughter, then his other son and finally his wife fell into the clutches of death, all shoved into the burlap sack. Only Ananse remained.

Using his trickery, Ananse explained to Death that if he was to fall, he would splatter all over the ground due to the weight caused from all the food he had eaten from Death's house. This would mean that Death would not get a satisfactory meal from Ananse. He asked Death to get a barrel of flour from Ananse's kitchen to put underneath him so the flour would cushion his fall. Flashing his 37 and a half teeth in a grin, and now wanting to enjoy Ananse and his entire family in a good meal, Death agreed to get the barrel of flour.

This barrel of flour was so heavy that it could only be lifted by four men. Ananse figured he could get the rest of his family from the burlap bag and escape whilst Death struggled to bring the barrel of flour to where he was. However, just as quickly as Death had left to get the barrel and Ananse thought it a good time to let go of the ceiling, Death returned with the barrel and placed it underneath Ananse. Ananse had underestimated Death's strength.

As Death bent over the barrel, shifting it to make sure the flour was perfectly under Ananse, the spider saw his opening. Ananse dropped on top of Death's head, dunking the old man's face into the flour. Death was caught off guard by this so he did not have time to close his eyes as he was dunked into the flour. This temporarily blinded him, giving Ananse enough time to free his family and they ran for their lives.

Neither Ananse nor the rest of his family have been caught by Death, which is the reason why there are still stories about Ananse, some of which also include his family. This story also explains why spiders live on ceilings; to escape death. This story also has 3 other morals. The first is never to seek out death, the second is to never get anyone involved in dealings with Death, and the third being that even if those around you fall and die, you must persevere with life and continue to do so.
