= Antoa Nyamaa =

River god in Ghana

Antoa Nyamaa is a river god and deity in Ghana, with a shrine in the town of Antoa in the Ashanti Region. The river is considered the spiritual supreme court of Asante.

== Known for ==
The shrine is located on a small river that can be accessed from the town of Antoa through a farm path. Antoa Nyamaa is known for visiting mayhem on people who have been cursed in its name. To overturn a curse, a victim is made to bend in the river and a fowl is killed over their head. If the fowl lands with its breast facing up, the victim is redeemed. If the fowl doesn't turn over, the victim must beat the water's surface while pleading with the god for forgiveness.
