= Tano River =

Tano River Rivière Tanoé
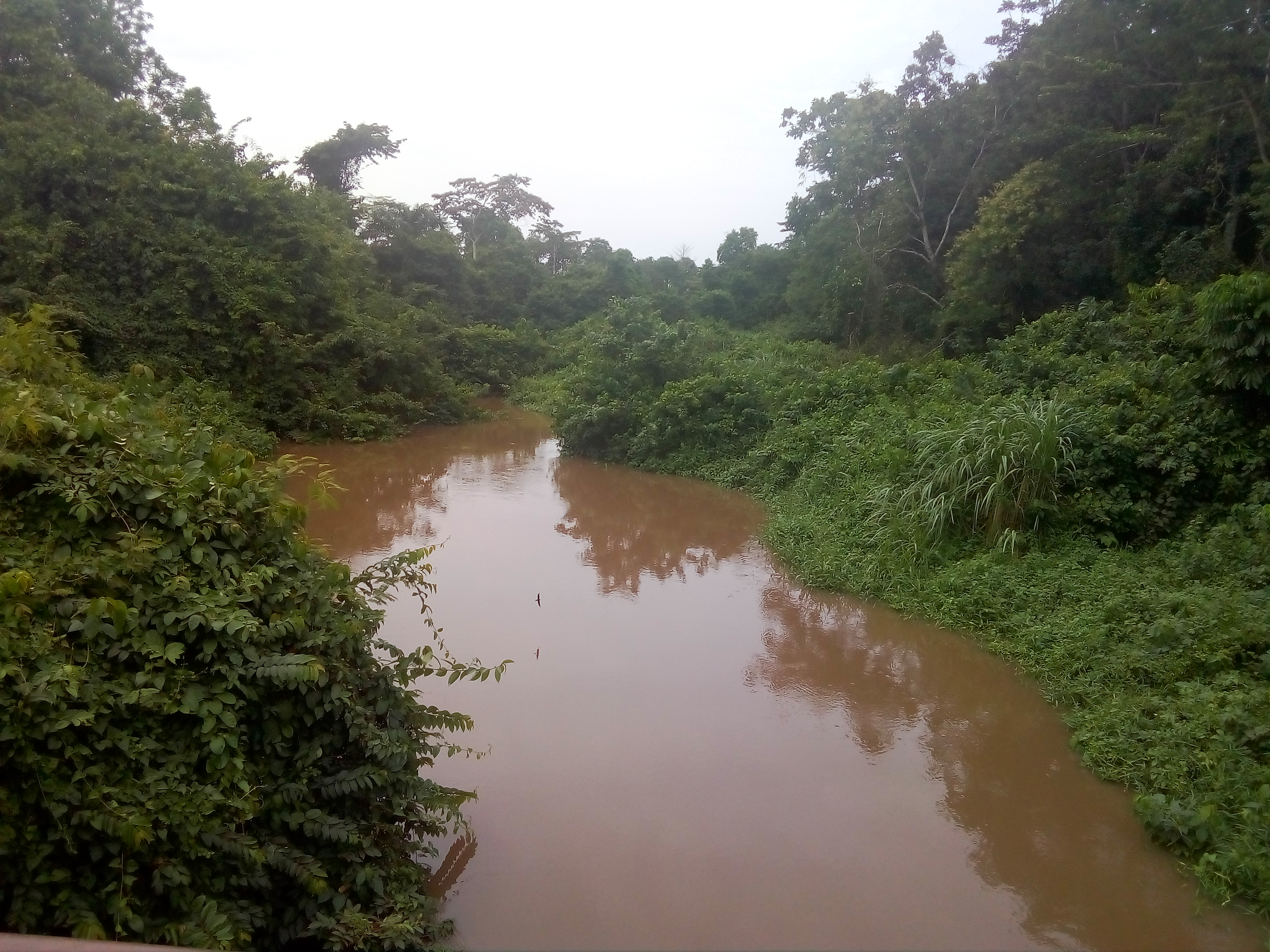

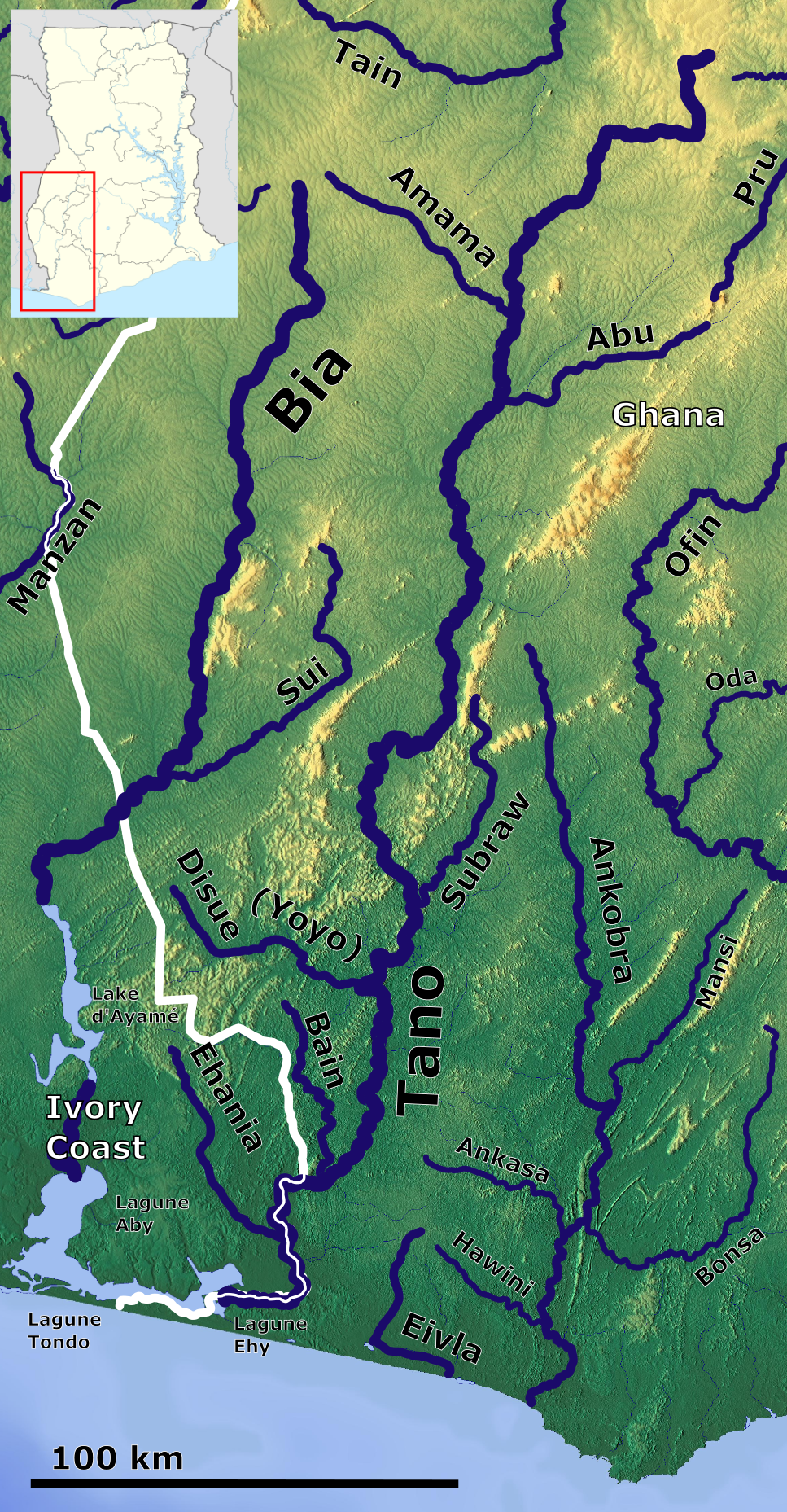
- South Ghana with the Tano

Location
- Countries: Ghana and Ivory Coast

Physical characteristics
- Mouth: Atlantic Ocean
  - coordinates: 7°37′50″N 1°53′58″W
- Length: 400 km (250 mi)
- Discharge
  - location: Mouth

Basin features

The Tano or Tanoé River (French: Rivière Tano) is a river in Ghana. It flows for 400 kilometres from a town called Traa, a suburb of Techiman, the capital town of Bono East Region in the Republic of Ghana to Ehy Lagoon, Tendo Lagoon and finally Aby Lagoon in Ivory Coast where it enters the Atlantic Ocean. The river Tano forms the last few kilometres of the international land boundary between Ghana and Ivory Coast.

Indigenous local beliefs of Bono holds that, Tano (Ta Kora), the most powerful abosom (god), god of war and lightning, lives at the source of the river, and is the personification of the river.

The last few individuals of Miss Waldron's Red Colobus (Piliocolobus badius waldronae), one of the world's most threatened primates, are believed to live in the forest between the river and Ehy Lagoon. As of mid-2008, this area is slated for logging by Unilever, with the aim to replace it with oil palm plantations.

In January 2020, a truck with loads of sulfuric acid plunged into the Tano river. On January 13 the people were advised not to drink the water because of contamination. The river has since been restored to its natural state.

== Drainage Basin and Hydrology ==
The Tano River is the principal watercourse of the Tano Basin, one of the four major river basins in southwestern Ghana, alongside the Ankobra, Bia, and Pra basins. The basin covers approximately 16,060 square kilometres, of which about 92.6% lies within Ghana and 7.4% extends into Ivory Coast.

The basin extends between latitudes 5°00′ N and 7°40′ N and longitudes 1°48′ W and 3°05′ W. Major tributaries of the Tano River include the Boin, Disue, Amama, Abu, Gaw, Suraw, Samre, Totua, and Disri rivers.

The Tano Basin supports agriculture, forestry, mining, and domestic water supply across southwestern Ghana and southeastern Ivory Coast. The river system drains a region rich in mineral resources, including gold and bauxite deposits.

== Ecology and Biodiversity ==
The Tano River and its associated wetlands support important ecosystems, particularly in the lower basin around the Tanoé-Ehy swamp forests and the Aby Lagoon complex. These habitats contain significant biodiversity and provide ecological connectivity between Ghana and Ivory Coast.

The basin also supports numerous fish species, wetland birds, and tropical forest ecosystems that are increasingly threatened by deforestation, agricultural expansion, and illegal mining activities.

== Environmental Challenges ==
The Tano River Basin faces increasing environmental pressures from deforestation, pollution, illegal small-scale mining (known locally as galamsey), and agricultural expansion. These activities contribute to water quality degradation, sedimentation, and habitat loss.

Transboundary cooperation between Ghana and Côte d’Ivoire is increasingly important to ensure sustainable management of the river's water resources and ecosystems.

== See also ==
- List of rivers of Ghana
- Tano (Ta Kora)
