= Bia River =

Bia River Rivière Bia
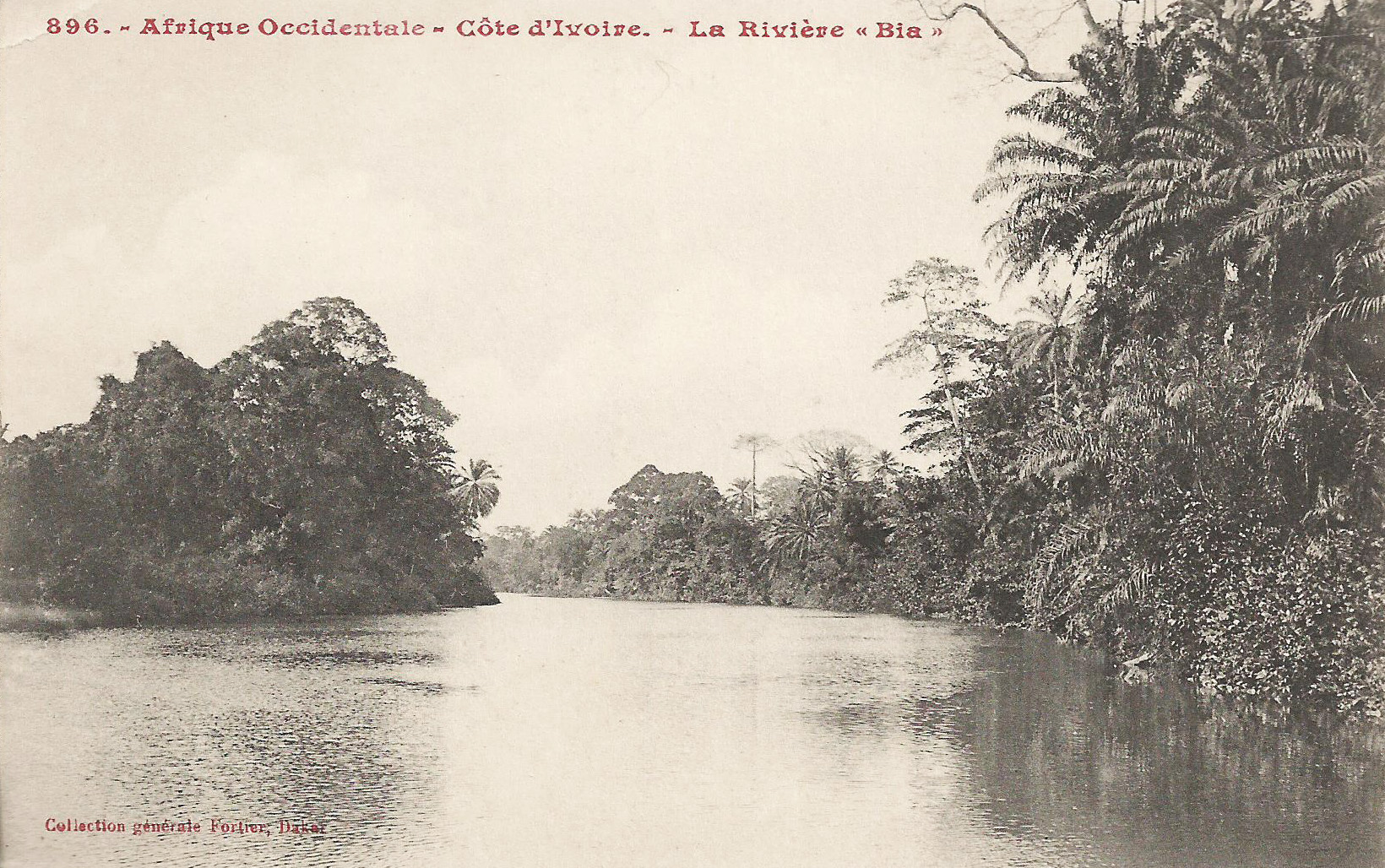

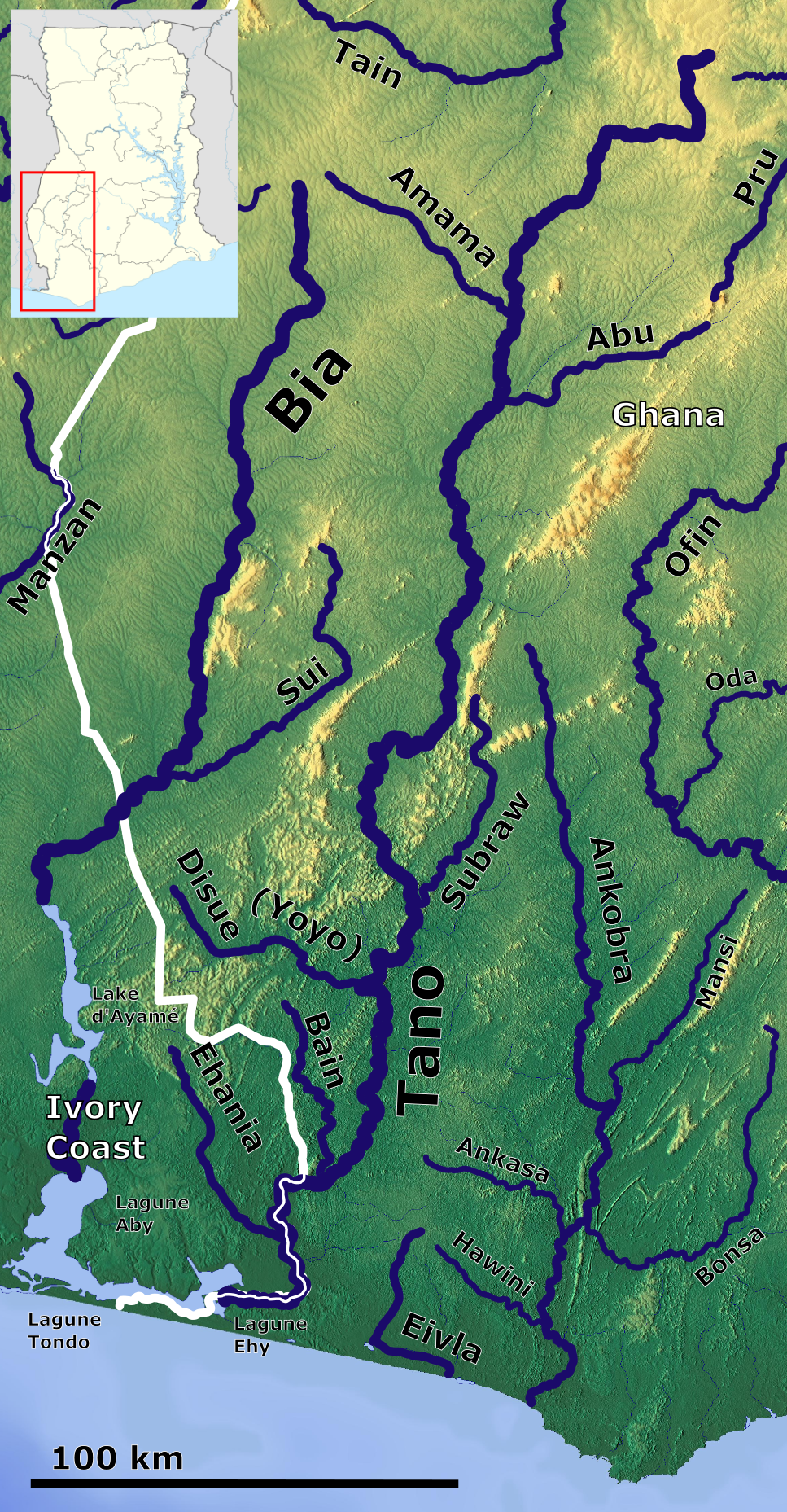
- South Ghana with the Bia

Location
- Countries: Ghana and Ivory Coast

Physical characteristics
- Mouth: Aby Lagoon
  - coordinates: 6°05′48″N 3°05′42″W
- Length: 300 km (190 mi)
- Basin size: 9,300 km^{2} (3,600 sq mi)
- Discharge
  - location: Mouth
  - average: 83 m^{3}/s (2,900 cu ft/s)

The Bia is a river that is situated primarily in Ghana and flows through Ghana and Ivory Coast, emptying into Aby Lagoon on the Ghanaian/Ivory Coast border. A hydroelectric dam was built across the Bia at Ayamé in 1959, causing the formation of Lake Ayame.
