= List of rivers of Ghana =

Rivers in Ghana

This is a list of rivers in Ghana. This list is arranged by drainage basin, with respective tributaries indented under each larger stream's name.

== Ghana ==
The Pra River system

- Bia River
- Tano River
  - Nini River
- Ankobra River
- Pra River
  - Ofin River
  - Birim River
  - Anum River
- Ayensu River
- Densu River
- Volta River
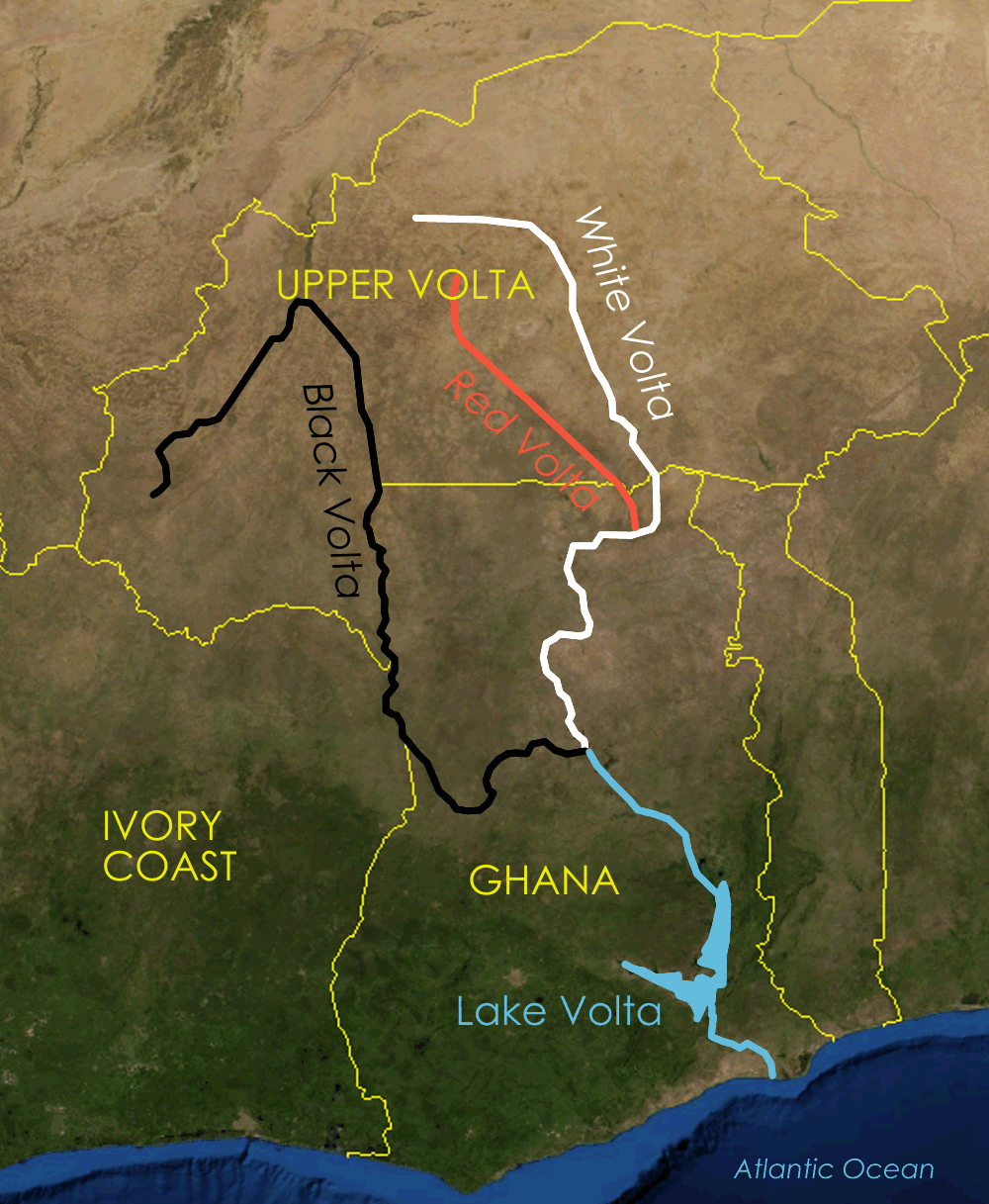
  The Volta river system
  - Angongwi
  - Todzie River
  - Lake Volta
    - Afram River
    - River Asukawkaw
    - Oti River
      - Mo River
    - Atakora River
    - Sene River
    - Daka River
    - Pru River
    - Black Volta (Mouhoun River)
      - Tain River
    - White Volta (Nakambé)
      - Kulpawn River
        - Sisili River
      - Red Volta (Nazinon)

== See also ==
- Geography of Ghana
- Media related to Rivers of Ghana at Wikimedia Commons
