= Water supply and sanitation in Ghana =

Data
- Water coverage (broad definition): 78% (2015)
- Sanitation coverage (broad definition): 14% (2015) (Share of collected wastewater treated: about 10% in Accra)
- Continuity of supply: 25% in Accra
- Average urban water use (L/person/day): n/a
- Average urban water and sanitation tariff (US$/m^{3}): GHS3.01/m3 (US$0.76/m3)
- Share of household metering: n/a
- Annual investment in WSS: US$0.7 per capita
- Share of external financing: About 90% development assistance

Institutions
- Decentralization to municipalities: In rural areas: decentralization to districts, since 1994
- National water and sanitation company: Yes: Ghana Water Company Limited (GWCL)
- Water and sanitation regulator: In urban areas: Public Utilities Regulatory Commission (PURC)
- Responsibility for policy setting: Ministry of Sanitation and Water Resources
- Sector law: various
- No. of urban service providers: 1: GWCL
- No. of rural service providers: more than 400 community-managed piped systems

The water supply and sanitation sector in Ghana is a sector that is in charge of the supply of healthy water and also improves the sanitation of water bodies in the country.

In Ghana, the drinking water supply and sanitation sectors face a number of issues, including relatively limited sanitation access, intermittent supply, significant water losses, poor water pressure, and pollution. Since 1994, the sector has been gradually reformed through the creation of an autonomous regulatory agency, introduction of private sector participation, decentralization of the rural supply to 138 districts and increased community participation in the management of rural water systems.

Between 2006 and 2011, an international company (AVRL) managed all urban water systems since under a 5-year management contract which expired after achieving only some of its objectives. The reforms also aim at increasing cost recovery and a modernization of the urban utility Ghana Water Company Limited (GWCL). Another problem which partly arose from the recent reforms is the existence of a multitude of institutions with overlapping responsibilities. The National Water Policy (NWP), which was launched at the beginning of 2008, introduced a comprehensive sector policy. The National Water Policy was reviewed with an updated version in 2024.

== Access ==
The water supply and sanitation infrastructure is insufficient, especially in rural areas. There are substantial discrepancies between access data from various sources, partially because of different definitions being used by different institutions that are providing access data. According to the Joint Monitoring Program for Water Supply and Sanitation of UNICEF and WHO, access to water and sanitation is as follows:

		Urban (51% of the population)	Rural (49% of the population)	Total
Water	'At least basic' definition	88%	66%	78%
Water	House connections	33%	3%	18%
Sanitation	'At least basic' definition	19%	9%	14%
Sanitation	Sewerage	?	?	?

According to the United Nations 2015 MDG report, the target of halving the proportion of people without access to safe drinking water has been attained in Ghana. The share of non-functional supply systems in Ghana is estimated at almost one third, with many others operating substantially below designed capacity. Moreover, domestic water supply competes with a rising demand for water by the expanding industry and agriculture sectors.

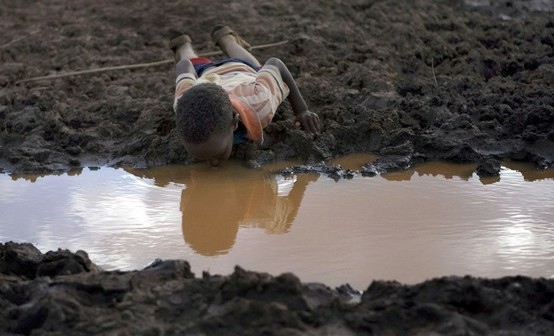
Water pollution in Ghana

About 88% of the urban population in Ghana have access to at least basic drinking water. Disparities exist between urban and rural safe drinking water access. According to the Ghana Multiple Indicator Cluster Survey of 2011, urban dwellers are more likely to have access to safe drinking water than the rural dwellers at 91% and 69%, respectively. Consequently, dependency on unsafe water sources is higher in rural areas. The turbidites of most local surface waters in rural areas are greater than 200 NTUs (nephelometric turbidity units) and contain high microbial and faecal contamination, putting children and the rest of the population at high risk for water-related diseases.

Compared to the rest of Ghana, the three northern regions of Ghana are particularly deprived of clean drinking water, with one in ten children dying before their fifth birthday due to some water-related illnesses. In the main Northern Region of Ghana alone, 32% of the 2.5 million residents lack access to improved water sources and must often resort to contaminated drinking-water. Regarding sanitation, only 14% of the total population of Ghana are using an improved sanitation facility as of 2010.

Improved Drinking Water Source	Unimproved Drinking Water Source
Household connection	Rivers or ponds
Borehole	Bucket
Protected dug well	Unprotected well
Protected spring	Unprotected spring
Public Standpipe	Vendor-provided water
	Tanker truck water
	Bottled (and sachet) water

This table presents the classifications of improved and unimproved water sources in Ghana since the end of the Millennium Development Goals, according to the WHO and UNICEF. As of the end of 2015, improved water sources included household water pipes, boreholes, protected dug wells and springs, and public standpipes.

== Service quality ==
=== Continuity of supply ===
According to one estimate, one quarter of the residents in Accra receive a continuous water supply. Approximately 30% are provided water for 12 hours each day, five days a week. Another 35% are supplied for two days each week. The remaining 10% who mainly live on the outskirts of the capital are completely without access to piped water. According to another source, the situation is even worse: In February 2008 some communities within the Accra-Tema metropolis were served either once in a week, once in a fortnight or once in a month.

The continuity of water supply in rural areas and the Northern Region of Ghana are less frequent. Particularly in rural areas, locals are forced to fetch their own water from a variety of water sources depending on location:

- Tube wells or boreholes – a deep hole that has been driven, bored or drilled to reach ground water. The water is delivered by tube through a pump that is powered by a human, and the well is protected by a platform to prevent run-offs or bird droppings into the water.
- Protected dug well – well protected from runoff water by a well lining or casing raised above ground level.
- Rainwater collection – rain that is collected or harvested from surfaces and stored in a container for use.
- Water tank truck – water is trucked into a community and sold from the truck.
- Unprotected dug wells or springs – a well not protected from runoff or bird droppings.
- Cart with small tank/drum – water is sold by a provider who transports water into a community. Transportation is done by donkey carts or motoking.
- Surface water sources – rivers, dams, lakes, ponds, etc. All of them are really likely to be polluted, which will be dangerous for the people who drink from there. These are the most dangerous sources of water for the population in Ghana, since they may have so many bacteria and toxic product in them that the people will get infections and diseases, some of which could even kill ly.

== Water contamination ==
=== Drinking water quality ===
The Fecal-oral disease route transmission

The lack of clean drinking water and sanitation systems is a severe public health concern in Ghana, contributing to 70% of diseases in Ghana. Despite significant strive by the government and its developing partners, about 76% of households risk drinking water contaminated with animal and human excreta. Widespread use of plastic drinking water sachets due to lack of available potable water has also led to increased plastic pollution, often polluting water bodies, choking storm-water drains and causing death of livestock. The country's gold mining industry has polluted 60% of Ghana's waters.

Due to unclean water and improper sanitation, Ghana has 1,000 children under five years old dying each year from diarrhoea, caused by polluted water. The water that they get from ponds, lakes or rivers is of bad quality. Consequently, households without access to clean water are forced to use less reliable and hygienic sources, and often pay more.

Contaminated drinking water, along with poor sanitation, are linked to transmission of water-related diseases such as cholera, diarrhoea, dysentery, hepatitis A, typhoid and polio. Due to drinking contaminated water, diarrheal disease is the third most commonly reported illness at health centres across Ghana. 25% of all deaths in children under the age of five are attributed to diarrhoea. In addition to lack of sanitation infrastructure, some cultural beliefs and views encourage open defecation. Of the total population in Ghana, 23% use open defecation as their sanitation facility. As many as 72% of people in the Northern Region open defecate, making it the region with the highest prevalence of open defecation in Ghana

The majority of waterborne illnesses are enteric diseases (i.e. intestinal diseases) transmitted through the faecal-oral route. In the transmission pathways of disease through water contamination, human feces from public defecation end up in water sewages and non-recycling latrines, which is then collected in the local surface waters by rainfall and ingested by local inhabitants through direct exposure, absorption and ingestion. Surface waters are the main drinking-water source for the communities of Northern Region, Ghana.

In 2024 at a stakeholder conference, Ing Harold Esseku, Senior Water and Sanitation Specialist at the World Bank disclosed that Ghana is on the path to improving water quality by 2030.

=== Effects on education ===
Access to clean water has significant consequences for education in Ghana, particularly for girls. Water scarcity imposes substantial time burdens on households, diverting the time needed for productive and educational activities, with the burden falling disproportionately on women and girls, who are mostly responsible for water collection. Research conducted in Northern Ghana found that women and girls are the primary drawers of water for household needs due to patriarchal cultural norms, with water shortages weighing more heavily on women than men.

A study specific to Ghana found a 50% reduction in the time spent hauling water would the proportion of girls aged 5 to 15 attending school by approximately 7 percent point on the average, with stronger effects observed in rural communities. A mixed-methods study of rural Ghana found that over 67% of respondents reported water scarcity disrupting children's school attendance, with women and girls bearing the primary responsibility for fetching water often at the expense of educational opportunities.

Girls equally suffer from water shortage due to their constructed gender roles in assisting their mothers to collect water for household use, with their education being negatively affected as a result. Across 26 African countries, an estimated 4.63 million children were not attending school and 1.5 million had dropped out due to water scarcity-related factors, with children in households without water scarcity showing significant higher school attendance.

=== Wastewater treatment ===
Ghana's urban areas face a severe wastewater management crises driven by rapid population growth and inadequate infrastructure. As of 2021, nearly 71% of households in Ghana disposed of their wastewater by throwing it onto the ground, on the street, or outside their homes, according to the Ghana Statistical Service. Ghana generates approximately 12,710 tonnes of solid waste every day, with only 10% collected and disposed of properly. Untreated wastewater is frequently discharged into rivers and streams, affecting aquatic ecosystems and public health, while urban agriculture in cities such as Accra and Kumasi depend heavily on untreated wastewater for irrigation, raising serious concerns about food safety.

Treatment infrastructure remains critically insufficient. In the capital of Accr, only approximately 10% of generated wastewater is collected. The Korle Lagoon, Accra's principal drainage outlet, receives 80% of its pollution from wastewater, and the city's Waste Management Department is capable of collecting only 60% of waste generated daily, with the remainder dumped in open spaces, surface drains, and water bodies that flow into the lagoon. The lagoon recorded Total Dissolved Solids of 2,210 mg/l, far exceeding Ghana EPA standards, and has been described as an environmental nightmare, with approximately 60% of Accra's population contributing to solid waste pollution in its catchment area.

A study assessing the Legon sewage treatment plant between 2018 and 2023 found that while the plant was 99% efficient in reducing E.coli loads, increased wastewater volume was associated with rising antimicrobial resistance patterns in effluent water, raising broader public health concerns about the discharge of treated wastewater into receiving water bodies. Ghana's urban population grew from 50.9% in 2010 to 56.7% in 2021 and continues to rise, further straining wastewater management capacity as urbanisation outpaces infrastructure development.

== Water resources ==
Ghana is well endowed with water resources. The Volta river system basin, consisting of the Oti, Daka, Pru, Sene and Afram rivers as well as the white and Black Volta rivers, covers 70% of the country area. Another 22% of Ghana is covered by the southwestern river system watershed comprising the Bia, Tano, Ankobra and Pra rivers. The coastal river system watershed, comprising the Ochi-Nawuka, Ochi Amissah, Ayensu, Densu and Tordzie rivers, covers the remaining 8% of Ghana.

Furthermore, groundwater is available in mesozoic and cenozoic sedimentary rocks and in sedimentary formations underlying the Volta basin. The Volta Lake, with a surface of 8,500 km^{2}, is one of the world's largest artificial lakes. In all, the total actual renewable water resources are estimated to be 53.2 billion m^{3} per year.

Ghana's water resources face increasing threats from both climate change and illegal mining, locally known as galamsey. Climate change has disrupted rainfall patterns, leading to prolonged droughts in some regions and erratic flooding in others, while illegal mining activities have severely polluted major rivers such as Pra, Ankobra, and Offin with harmful chemicals including mercury, rendering them unsafe for consumption and aquatic life. According to Water Resource Commission of Ghana, over 60% of water bodies in mining regions are now considered polluted due to these activities.

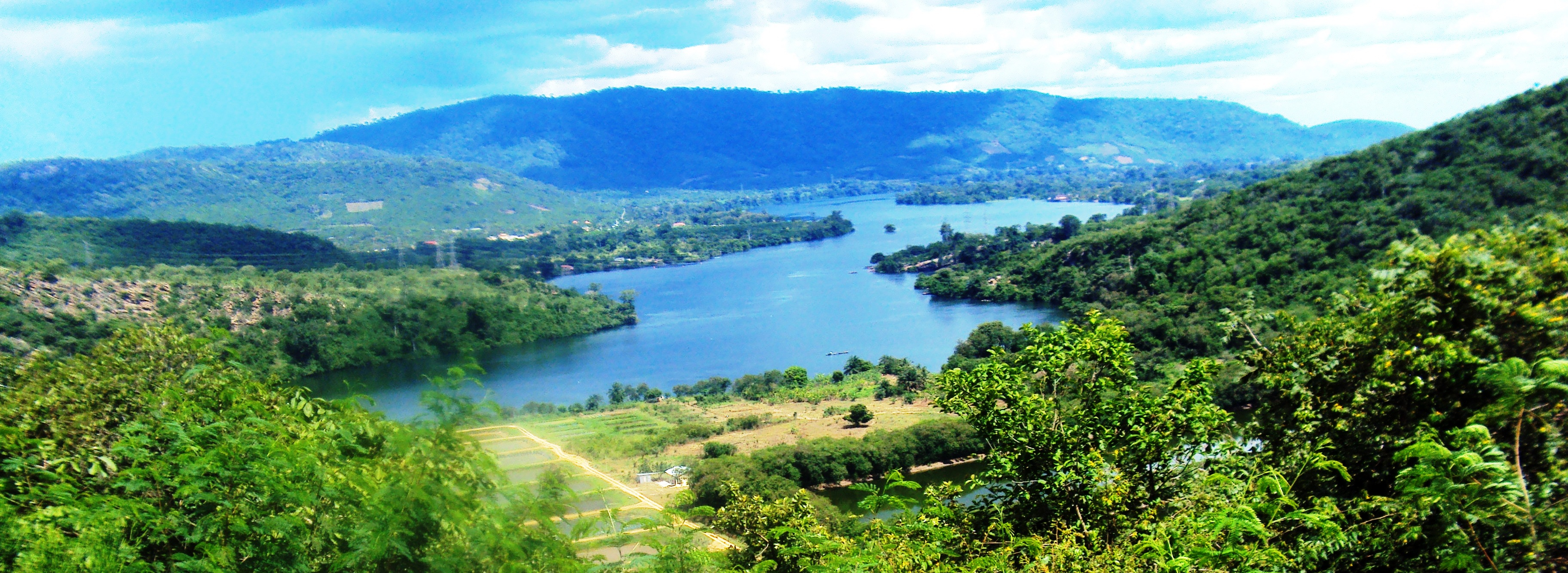
Panorama and landscape view of Lake Volta in Volta Basin and Eastern Region of Ghana. Lake Volta by artificial surface area is the largest reservoir, lake, and artificial lake on Earth. Lake Volta drains into the Gulf of Guinea on the Atlantic Ocean. Volta River has three main tributaries—the Black Volta, White Volta and Red Volta.

== Water use ==
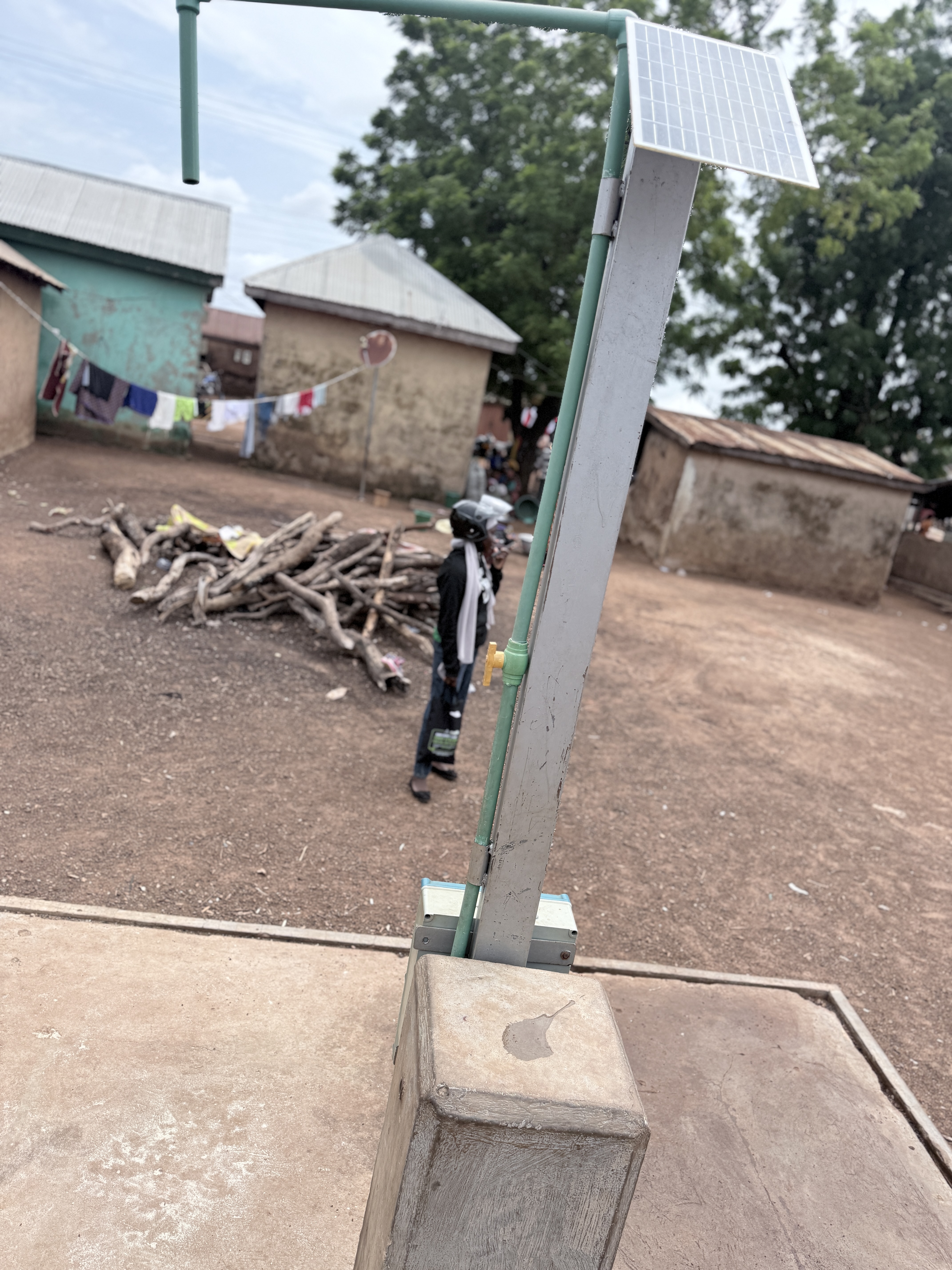
A solar-powered mechanized water borehole providing a modern water source for a community in Northern Region.

Ghana's water resources are used across three main sectors: agriculture, domestic supply, and industrial and hydroelectric generation. According to FAO AQUASTAT data, agriculture accounts for the largest share of Ghana's freshwater withdrawals, consistent with broader patterns across sub-Saharan Africa where farming accounts for over 80% of water use on the continent. Domestic water use competes with rising demand from Ghana's expanding industrial sector and a population that has grown from approximately 19 million in 2000 to over 34 million by 2024.

Hydroelectric power generation represents a critical dimension of Ghana's water use. The Akosombo Dam, also known as the Volta Dam, is a hydroelectric dam on the Volta River used to generate electricity for most of the 16 regions of Ghana and its neighbouring West African countries, including Togo and Benin. However, the dam's dual role as both a power source and flood management infrastructure creates significant tension. In September 2023, after heavy rainfall pushed water levels close to unsafe limits, the Volta River Authority opened the spill-gates to reduce pressure on the dam, and the resulting downstream flooding displaced more than 31,000 people. The dam's operational capacity was exceeded on account of rising water levels as a result of an increased rate of heavy rainfall, and the flooding severely affected communities in the North and Central Tongu districts including Mepe, Battor, Sogakope, Mafi, Adidome and Ada.

The Volta River Authority was criticised for failing to maintain an unoccupied flood zone capable of absorbing excess water and for not providing communities with timely warnings to evacuate before the spillage. Historical records show the Akosombo Dam has been spilled previously in 1966, 1967, 1968, 1969, 1970, 1971, 1972, 1974, 1991, and 2010, indicating a recurring pattern of flood risk management challenges associated with the dam.

== History and recent developments ==
Archaeological work in the house ruins of Begho (12th–19th century) have revealed the existence of cisterns which were on average, two meters deep. In 1817, Thomas Edward Bowdich documented upon the sanitation methods in the Ashanti Empire including the prevalence of latrines across the houses of Kumasi.

What surprised me most... was the discovery that every house had its cloacae (latrine), besides the common ones for the lower orders without the town. They were generally situated under a small archway in the most retired angle of the building, but not unfrequently upstairs, within a separate room like a small closet where the large hollow pillar also assists to support the upper story: the holes are of small circumference, but dug to a surprising depth, and boiling water is daily poured down, which effectually prevents the least offence....

— Bowdich, 1817.

In 1821, William Hutton confirmed Bowdich's observations.

Mr. Bowdich's observations regarding the houses being provided with cloacaes and the general cleanliness of the Ashantees are correct; and there can be no doubt that in the arrangement of their dwellings they are superior to many of their neighbours....

— Hutton, 1821.

Bowdich recorded in the early 19th century, that rubbish and waste from all houses were burnt every morning behind the streets. According to scholar Donna Maier, a Public Works Department existed in the Ashanti Empire under the stool called Akwammofo Akonnwa. This department was responsible for cleaning the streets of Kumasi daily and it ensured that the people had kept their compounds clean and weeded.

In 1928, the first piped water supply system was constructed at Cape Coast. The Water Supply Division of the Public Works Department was responsible for the service provision in rural and urban areas of Ghana. After Ghana's independence in 1957, the division was separated from the Public Works Department and placed under the Ministry of Works and Housing. In 1965, it was transformed into the Ghana Water and Sewerage Corporation (GWSC), a legal public utility responsible for the provision of urban and rural water supply for public, domestic, and industrial purposes as well as the establishment, operation, and control of sewerage systems.

=== Decentralization, focus on rural areas, and independent regulation (1994–1999) ===
In the mid-1990s, under the Presidency of Jerry Rawlings and after the passing of a new democratic Constitution in 1992, the government of Ghana enacted five key laws that affected the responsibility for water supply and sanitation:

- The Local Government Act No. 462 of 1993 defined the use of powers of District Assemblies as the highest political authority in each District, headed by a District Chief Executive (similar to a mayor). Neither the constitution nor the Local Government Act clearly define the responsibilities of District Assemblies, and initially they had no role in water supply and sanitation until they were partially transferred to them in 1999.
- The Water Resources Commission Act No. 552 of 1996 created the Water Resources Commission (WRC) that was made responsible for integrated water resources management including permits for water abstraction.
- The Public Utilities and Regulatory Commission Act No. 538 of 1997 created the Public Utilities and Regulatory Commission (PURC) that was made responsible for the regulation of the electricity sector and urban water supply, including the review of requests for tariff increases, the monitoring of service quality and the protection of consumers.
- The Community Water and Sanitation Agency Act No. 564 of 1998 created the Community Water and Sanitation Agency (CWSA) that became responsible for the support of local communities and District Assemblies in terms of rural water supply and sanitation. The CWSA emerged from the Community Water and Sanitation Division that had been created as a semi-autonomous division of GWSC in 1994.
- Under the provisions of the Statutory Corporations (Conversion to Companies) Act 461 of 1993 and in line with a government policy to transform state corporations into companies operated on a commercial basis, GWSC was transformed into a company called GWCL, which remained responsible for urban water supply only, while responsibility for sewer systems was transferred to the District Assemblies.

In 1999, the responsibility to support communities in the provision of water supply and sanitation in more than 110 small towns and in rural areas was transferred to the District Assemblies. Sanitation also became a responsibility of the District Assemblies, both in urban and rural areas. Furthermore, the government pursued private sector participation in urban water supply with the assistance of the World Bank through preparatory studies and workshops, but without actually bringing in the private sector yet.

=== Private sector participation in urban areas (2000–2011) ===
To carry out the private sector participation of GWCL, originally a 10-year lease contract was envisaged. In 2000, a lease contract between GWCL and the US company Azurix failed due to public opposition and accusations of corruption which led to the formation of the Coalition against Water Privatization. In October 2006, under the Presidency of John Kufuor and with the support of the World Bank-funded Urban Water Project (see below) a five-year management contract was signed between the GWCL and Aqua Vitens Rand Limited (AVRL), a consortium of the Dutch public water company Vitens and the South African public company Rand Water. The main objectives of the 5-year management contract were:

- Improving the reliability (pressure and flow rate) and quality of potable water,
- Ensuring the company's financial sustainability,
- Improving customer service, and
- Providing access to potable water at affordable prices to low income consumers. In 2008 severe water shortages in Accra were reported due to power outages at two water treatment plants. The management contract expired in June 2011 without being renewed after having achieved its objectives only partially.

In rural areas, the powers and resources of District Assemblies were strengthened through the Local Government Service Act 656 of 2003. The Act transferred the power to appoint, promote and discipline civil servants from the national government to the District Assemblies. In 2006 a Districts Development Fund was created to channel central government and donor funds in a transparent and effective way to District Assemblies. An Environmental, Health and Sanitation Directorate was created in the Ministry of Local Governments and Rural Development in 2009 to focus more on sanitation. In this context a program was launched to eliminate open defecation through community-led total sanitation.

== Responsibility for water supply and sanitation ==
The Pra River system of the rivers of Ghana.

According to a multi-donor review of Ghana's water supply sector, it is "quite well structured", with the government in charge of policy and regulation, while the private sector and communities play important roles in service delivery. The institutional framework for sanitation is much less clear, with responsibilities not being clearly defined.

=== Policy and regulation ===
At the moment, a number of institutions exist to supervise and regulate water supply and sanitation. The policy framework is based on the Ghana Poverty Reduction Strategy (GPRS).

General water sector policies for both rural and urban areas are set by the Water Directorate within the Ministry of Water Resources, Works and Housing (MWRWH). Furthermore, the ministry solicits funding from external support agencies, monitors the sector, and advises the Cabinet. The Water Sector Restructuring Secretariat, created in 1997 in the Ministry of Water Resources, Works and Housing, oversees the process of private sector participation in the sector.

The Ministry of Local Government and Rural Development shares responsibility for setting sanitation policies and coordinating funding for the sub-sector with MWRWH. The government promotes decentralization so that sanitation policies are expected to be carried out by Metropolitan, Municipal, and District Assemblies. To enforce environmental quality laws, the Environmental Protection Agency (EPA) under the Ministry of Environment and Science is expected to examine the impact of sanitation development activities on the environment.

To overcome the lack of coordination between the numerous sector institutions, the Minister of Water Resources, Works, and Housing, Abubakar Saddique Boniface, launched a National Water Policy (NWP) in February 2008, which covers water resources management, water supply and sanitation. Although the sector has made progress, a lack of coherence in policy formulation resulted in a multitude of implementation strategies. The NWP aimed to formulate a comprehensive sector policy and to make it easier for development partners to provide the necessary support to the sector. The NWP had been prepared by the Water Resources Commission (WRC) since 2002.

=== Illegal mining activities and water supply ===
Illegal small-scale gold mining in Ghana, locally known as galamsey, poses a severe threat to the country's water supply. Harmful mining waste released into rivers such as the Pra, Ankobra, and Birim severely contaminates water bodies, threatens aquatic life, and results in the loss of livelihood for fishermen, with an estimated 60% of Ghana's water bodies polluted with toxic chemicals and waste from illegal mining.

Major rivers including the Pra and Ankobra are heavily polluted with mercury and cyanide exceeding WHO safety limits, with the contamination of water sources posing serious health risks to local populations including potential neurological and developmental effects from mercury exposure. Galamsey results in the incessant release of untreated liquid waste from the washing of alluvial gold, making it a key factor of pollution in river estuaries and causing detrimental effects to aquatic ecosystems. Studies have projected that Ghana will have to import water for domestic and industrial use within 15 years due to the inability to treat its highly turbid water bodies.

=== Service provision ===
==== Urban areas ====
The Ghana Water Company Ltd. (GWCL) is responsible for providing, distributing, and conserving water for domestic, public, and industrial purposes in 82 urban systems in localities with more than 5,000 inhabitants. Local private companies are in charge of meter installation, customer billing, and revenue collection. Urban sanitation is a responsibility of local governments.

==== Rural areas ====
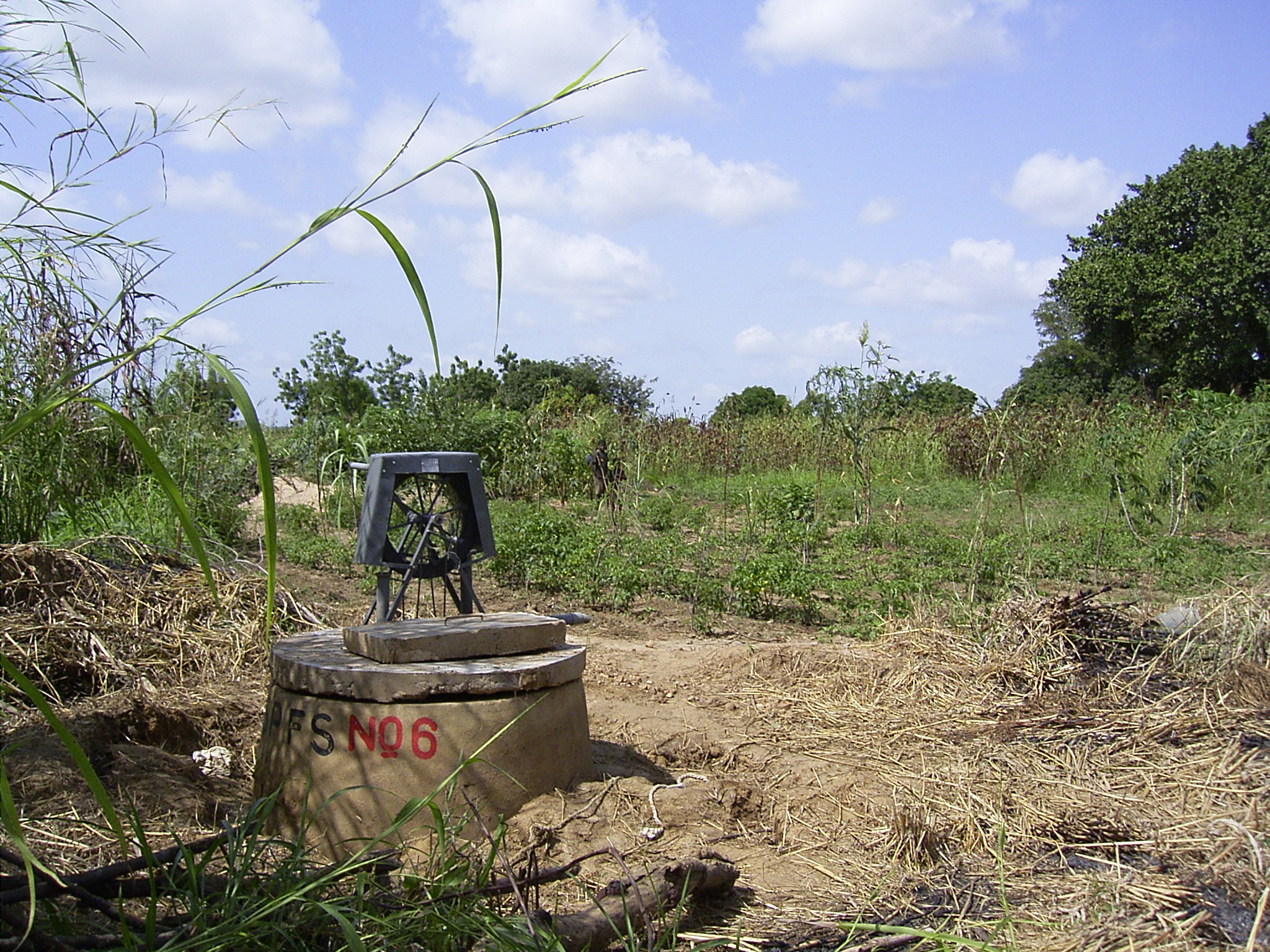
A rope pump close to Paga, Upper East Region

The Community Water and Sanitation Agency (CWSA) is in charge of coordinating and facilitating the implementation of the National Community Water and Sanitation Programme (NCWSP) in rural areas, which is carried out directly by the communities and their District Assemblies. The NCWSP focuses on three main objectives to achieve health improvements: safe water supply, hygiene education, and improved sanitation.

The CWSA was created in 1994 under the framework of the Ghana decentralization policy and became autonomous in 1998. The institution does not directly construct, operate, and maintain facilities for water supply and sanitation. Instead, its role is to coordinate the work of a number of actors which carry out the services in rural areas, including public sector organizations, local beneficiary communities, private sector organizations, and NGOs. The CWSA is also expected to ensure that financial support from development partners is effectively used and to ensure hygiene education. The agency operates ten regional offices besides its head office in Accra.

In communities with fewer than 5,000 inhabitants, water supply systems are owned and managed by the respective community on a demand-driven basis. According to the NCWSP, these systems do not receive any cross-subsidies and 5% of investment costs are paid by District Assemblies. Communities and in rural areas and small towns elect gender-balanced water and sanitation boards consisting of volunteers, including one or two village-based caretakers who received special training in repair and maintenance. Communities can contract private companies or NGOs to provide technical assistance, goods, or services.

Local companies drill boreholes and build hand-dug wells, and local artisans are used to provide household latrines. Maintenance units of CWSA have been privatized and the regional companies created through this process now perform major repairs on behalf of District Assemblies. Minor repairs are carried out by area mechanics. The communities' water and sanitation boards receive technical assistance by District Water and Sanitation Teams (DWST), ideally consisting of an engineer, a hygiene expert, and a community mobilizer. However, in some districts these teams are so weak that the regional teams of CWSA resort to providing direct assistance to local water and sanitation boards.

=== Other stakeholders ===
The Ghana Coalition of NGOs in Water and Sanitation (CONIWAS), created in 2001, "works in partnership with sector players to influence policies, remove barriers and promote access to potable water, sanitation and improved hygiene for the poor and vulnerable." According to the coalition, giving NGOs one voice for advocacy and lobbying has been one of its major benefits.

Innovations for Poverty Action

Innovations for Poverty Action (IPA) was founded in 2002 as a research and policy non-profit organization that aims to discover and promote effective solutions to global poverty issues. IPA recruits researchers and decision-makers to measure the impacts of interventions in the areas of agriculture, education, health, financial inclusion, governance, peace & recovery, small & medium enterprises, and social protection among 18 country programs. Randomized Control Trials (RCT) and other forms of qualitative research are conducted to achieve this, including the Clean Water in Northern Ghana research study. This study assesses the willingness of households in Northern Ghana to purchase the Kosim filter that is sold by Pure Home Water (PHW), a Ghana-based NGO. The study also aims to measure the health effects of household-level water treatment in areas whose populations have a high risk of waterborne disease.

Pure Home Water

Pure Home Water (PHW) is a Ghana-based NGO and a social enterprise. Founded in 2005, PHW was designed to be a manufacturer of ceramic pot water filters located in the northern city of Tamale, Ghana. Its two goals include delivering aid to the people most in need of safe drinking water, sanitation and hygiene (WASH) in Northern Ghana, and to become financially and locally self-sustaining. This is accomplished by providing training and monitoring of correct, consistent and continuous (3Cs) use of the AfriClay filter. They also build and disseminate hand-washing stations and sanitation facilities throughout villages in the Northern Region. PHW is a partnered organization of Innovations for Poverty Action.

Saha Global

Saha Global (formerly known as Community Water Solutions) is a Boston, Massachusetts-based nonprofit founded in 2008 that aims to meet the water and energy needs of Ghanaian communities in the Northern Region. Saha Global works to empower the women of rural Ghanaian communities to provide access to clean water and electricity through the provision of business opportunities. This is accomplished by bringing young leaders from throughout the world to Ghana through its Global Leadership Program. While in Ghana, participants train local women to build businesses which can channel revenue back into their local communities. As of 2016, 84 clean water businesses and 20 solar electric businesses have been created with the aid of Saha Global, and 100% of these businesses are in full operation to date.

Water.org

Water.org is an American and international nonprofit developmental aid organization designed to deliver access to safe water and sanitation around the world by pioneering innovative and sustainable solutions to the global water crisis. This organization was founded in 1990 after the merging of two water NGOs: H_{2}O Africa, co-founded by Matt Damon, and WaterPartners, co-founded by Gary White. Through its efforts in making water and sanitation safe, accessible and cost-effective, Water.org has continued to deliver aid to more than four million lives around the world for over 25 years.

Currently, Water.org is working in two rural areas in Ghana: Volta Region and Upper East Region. These districts are among the poorest of the country, with less than half of the population having little access to safe drinking water and fewer families having access to improved sanitation. Additionally, the rural communities in these regions suffer greatly from waterborne diseases, including diarrhoea. Water.org works with local communities and partner organizations, such as Rural Aid, to construct wells, latrines and biosand filters in Ghana as well as to provide health and hygiene education.

== Efficiency of utilities ==
=== Non-revenue water ===
According to the Water Sector Restructuring Secretariat non-revenue water in urban areas stands at approximately 50% of the produced water, i.e. it is lost, among other things, due to leakage and illegal connections. According to a Ghanaian radio station, a survey showed that 3,000 out of 15,000 connections were illegal while 20 minor leaks were found. Furthermore, most of those connected to water supply do not pay their bills. At least at the end of the 1990s, the Ghanaian government participated in that poor payment culture.

As part of the efforts to reduce system losses, in February 2008 the Accra East Region of AVRL-GWCL has caused the arrest of ten illegal connection syndicates in the Adenta community. They had constructed huge underground reservoirs which served as a source of water for private water tanker operators. The tanker operators buy water from these illegal sources and sell it to private individuals at Ashaley Botwe at high prices.

=== Labor productivity ===
It is estimated that in 2010, GWCL had 7.2 per 1,000 connections. This figure is in line with regional levels. However, international good practice is less than 4 employees per 1,000 connections.

== Financial aspects ==
=== Tariffs and cost recovery ===
Water tariffs in Ghana are too low to recover the costs of the service. Water tariffs in rural areas tend to be higher than in urban areas.

Urban areas. In December 2015 the regulator PURC approved a 67.2% increase in urban water tariffs. Tariffs were increased from GHS1.78/m3 ($0.45/m3) to GHS3.01/m3 (US$0.76/m3). The average monthly bill for a family of five will reach GHS10.00 ($2.50). Ghana Water had requested a 400% tariff increase to fully cover costs, but the regulator had pared down the request substantially, citing concerns about affordability. Between 1990 and 1997, the average water tariff in Ghana's urban areas had been in the range of US$0.10 to US$0.15 per m^{3}.

At that time, the Government was not willing to approve major tariff increases. The situation changed with the creation of the regulatory agency PURC which autonomously examines and approves public service tariffs, resulting in an average water tariff of about US$0.50 in 2004. In 2006, GWCL's tariff for the first 20m³ consumed was US$0.55 per m^{3}, whereas US$0.76 were charged for each m^{3} exceeding 20m³ within a month. Subsequently, the USD equivalent of tariffs decreased again with the local currency losing in value.

Rural areas. According to the CWSA's policy, the water tariff in rural areas should recover the supply cost of the service, including operation, maintenance, major repairs, replacements, and extension to new areas. Tariffs are set by the District Assemblies in rural areas. However, the supply cost should be low enough to not result in a tariff of more than US$1 per m^{3}. A study conducted in five community-managed piped systems in the Ashanti Region found an average tariff of about US$0.60 per m^{3} in 2003, which actually covers between 57 and 77% of the full supply cost.

Another study which was carried out in 2005 indicates an average monthly expenditure for water of US$0.99 in 97 sample villages in the Volta Region and US$0.89 in 103 villages in the Brong Ahafo Region per household. However, in nearly 70% of the villages in Volta and only 40% of the villages in Brong Ahafo, at least 90% of the interviewed households actually paid for water. Where water use is charged, it is done through a fixed system or a pay-as-you-fetch system.

=== Investment and financing ===
Since economic efficiency as well as cost recovery in the sector are extremely low, financing water and sanitation investments in Ghana relies heavily on external funding. According to one estimate 90% of the total investment in the sector in the 1990s was made by external agencies, which contributed about US$500 million for the sector between 1990 and 2003. It is worth mentioning that sanitation generally receives much less attention. According to another estimate, more than 96% of expected financing in 2006 will be from external donors.

Despite the strong engagement of international donors, funding remains insufficient to achieve the Millennium Development Goals for water and sanitation, aiming at halving the share of the population without access to these services by 2015 compared to 1990. According to one estimate, the expansion and rehabilitation of urban infrastructure requires investments of US$1.3 billion over an unspecified period. Annual investment needs in water supply and sanitation are estimated by another source at US$150 million. Expected investment funding for 2006 was US$85 million, or 57% of the needs.

Actual annual investments in urban areas have been estimated by the Water Sector Restructuring Secretariat at around US$40 million per year, having "recently" declined to only US$17 million per year (without specifying which year). The US$40m figure for urban areas corresponds to about US$4 per capita, an average level compared to other low-income countries.

Private investments were mobilized through a Build-Operate-Transfer (BOT) project for a seawater desalination plant in Accra. The 25-year contract for the financing, construction and operation of a 60,000 cubic meter per day plant was awarded in 2012. Water will be sold at US$1.36/cubic meter to GWCL, with a guarantee from the Ministry of Finance. The World Bank subsidiary MIGA insures the package against political risk. Funding comes from the South African Standard Bank (US$88.7m) and the shareholder Abengoa Water ($38.1m). GWCL ruled out further desalination projects citing the country's abundant water resources and the need to quickly find a solution for the quickly growing Nungua area where the plant will be located.

The International Finance Corporation (IFC) supports the Asutsuare Water Treatment Plant, a 500 million Euro Build, Own, Operate and Transfer (BOOT) project with GWCL developed by the Belgian contractor Denys. It includes a water treatment plant with a capacity of 432,000 m3/day, located downstream from the Kpong Dam on the Volta River and two pipelines, each of approximately 73 km to Grand Accra, as well as two water reservoirs.

== International cooperation ==
Major donors active in water supply and sanitation in Ghana are the African Development Bank, Canada, Denmark, the EU Commission, France, Germany, Japan, the Netherlands, and the World Bank. There is a Multi-Donor Budgetary Support Mechanism, a Water and Sanitation Sector Group as well as Joint Sector Annual Review Conferences between the government and its "development partners" (donors).

=== African Development Bank ===
The African Development Bank contributes to the Accra Sewerage Improvement Project (ASIP) with a loan of US$69 million, while the Government of Ghana provides US$8.6 million. The project was approved by the ADB in 2006 and is expected to be implemented within five years. In this time, two treatment plants and eight pumping stations are expected to be built. Moreover, sewerage networks and sanitation facilities will be extended and rehabilitated. The project also supports environmental measures, institutional strengthening, engineering services, and project management.

=== Canadian International Development Agency ===
The Canadian International Development Agency (CIDA) supports the water supply and sanitation sector in Ghana's northern regions through three projects:

1. CIDA contributes US$11 million to the gender-balanced District Capacity Building Project (DISCAP), which aims at strengthening local capacities to manage water and sanitation resources, thus enabling local government bodies to provide water supply and sanitation services. DISCAP began in 2000 and will end in 2008.
2. The agency provides US$16.4 million for the Northern Region Water Sanitation Project (NORWASP), which began in 1999 and is expected to end in 2009. The main objective of the gender-balanced project is to increase access to water and sanitation through a demand-driven approach. At the end of the project, up to 250,000 communities in the eastern corridor section of the northern region are expected to have access to safe drinking water, including 420 which independently manage their new water systems.
3. The Northern Region Small Towns (NORST) project, which is being implemented from 2004 to 2014, is supported by CIDA with US$30 million. The project is expected to establish water supply and sanitation services in up to 30 small towns.

=== Germany ===
Germany supports rural water supply and sanitation as part of its support for Ghana's decentralization program. Together with other donors Germany supports the District Development Facility since 2009, established under the lead of the Ministry of Local Government and Rural Development. Until 2014, Germany cofinances up to 36 million euros of a total 210 million euros. The remainder is financed by other donors and the Ghanaian Government, which provides a third of the funding. The District Development Facility provides funds to District Assemblies that have to follow strict rules concerning transparency and accountability which are independently monitored. Districts that manage their funds well also receive more funds.

A previous rural water supply project supported by Germany was rated satisfactorily in an ex-post evaluation conducted in 2005. The evaluation found, among other things, that three to eight years after their construction only 4 percent of the wells had fallen completely in disuse, while 76 percent were functioning and 20 percent were temporarily out of order. The evaluation also found that in 28 percent of water samples the iron content was high and that water from other sources than the wells built under the project was still used for various purposes, including drinking.

=== World Bank ===
The World Bank supports both rural and urban water supply in Ghana.

Community Water and Sanitation Program (CWSP) The Second Community Water and Sanitation Program was initiated in 2000 with support of a World Bank IDA credit of US$21.9 million, aiming at increasing access and supporting effective and sustained use of improved community water supply and sanitation services in villages and small towns through a demand-driven approach. It built on lessons learned from the first Community Water and Sanitation Program which had been carried out from 1994 to 2000.

A large-scale decentralization approach in the planning, implementation, and management of water supply and sanitation in Ghana was one of the main characteristics of the second program. Moreover, the communities were given technical assistance and hygiene education. Gender-balanced water and sanitation committees were set up to actively engage and include NGOs, private sector actors, and District Assemblies. As a result of the program, which ended in 2004, nearly 800,000 people were provided with potable water and almost 6,000 households and 440 schools were provided with latrines.

Small Towns Water Supply and Sanitation Project

The Small Towns Water Supply and Sanitation Project was approved by the World Bank in 2004 with a loan of US$26 million. In 2007 the World Bank decided to support the project with an additional credit of US$10 million. The German development agency GTZ contributes to the project with US$400,000, while the Government of Ghana provides US$4.6 million.

The project will end in 2009 and aims at increasing water supply and sanitation access to small towns in six Ghanaian regions, providing about 500,000 people with water supply facilities and about 50,000 people with sanitary facilities. Therefore, the project supports the planning, construction, and rehabilitation of water and sanitation systems in small towns and provides hygiene promotion, training, and technical assistance. In addition, the CWSA is supported by a management fee equal to 5% of the funds disbursed to support the incremental costs of the project.

Urban Water Project

In 2004, the World Bank's Board approved a credit of US$103 million for the Urban Water Project, which was later turned into a grant. The Nordic Development Fund contributes another US$5 million, while the Government of Ghana provides the remaining US$12 million of the US$120 million project.

The main objectives of the program, which will end in 2010, are to (i) significantly increase access to water supply systems in the urban areas of Ghana with an emphasis on improving the service for the urban poor; and (ii) restoring the long-term financial stability, viability, and sustainability of the GWCL. It provides technical assistance and training. Moreover, the Urban Water Project supports private sector participation and thus contributed to the management contract between GWCL and AVRL.
