= Atakora =

Atakora may refer to:

- Atakora Department, Benin
- Atakora Province, Benin (historic)
- Atakora River
- Atakora Mountains
- Atakora (Jugu), see Rulers of the Gurmanche state of Jugu
