= Tree Aid =

UK non-governmental organisation operating in Africa

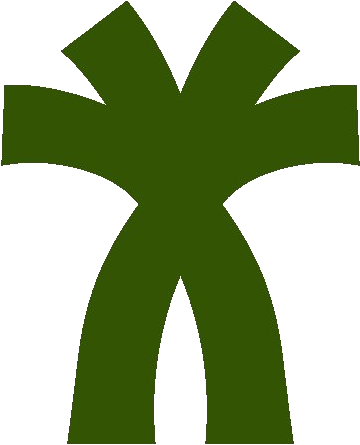
- Type: International Development and Environmental organisation
- Founded: 1987
- Headquarters: Brunswick Court, Brunswick Square, Bristol United Kingdom Ouagadougou, Burkina Faso, West Africa
- Area served: Burkina Faso, Ethiopia, Ghana, Mali, Niger
- Key people: Patrons: Adjoa Andoh Joanna Lumley, Zoë Wanamaker, Hilary Benn. Chair: Elizabeth Davis Chief Executive Officer: Tom Skirrow
- Revenue: 5,475,390 pound sterling (2020)
- Operating income: 7.6m GBP (2021/22)
- Number of employees: 50 paid staff
- Website: treeaid.org

Tree Aid is an international development non-governmental organisation which focuses on working with people in the Sahel region in Africa to tackle poverty and the effects of climate change by growing trees, improving people's incomes, and restoring and protecting land. It is a registered charity in the UK. Tree Aid has offices in Ouagadougou, Burkina Faso, in Mali, in Ethiopia, in Ghana, and in Bristol, United Kingdom. It currently has programmes running in Burkina Faso, Ethiopia, Ghana, Mali and Niger. Areas of Tree Aid's work include forest governance, natural resource management, food security and nutrition, and enterprise development. Tree Aid reported in their annual impact report 2019/20, that since 1987 it had grown 22 million trees, worked with 1.8 million people, and supported 36,350 people in enterprise groups.

Tree Aid's work growing trees, and restoring and protecting land is contributing to the Great Green Wall Sahara and Sahel Initiative, which is an African Union-led movement of 21 countries with the ambition to grow 8,000 km of trees, spanning from Senegal in the west to Djibouti in the east.

In 2017, Tree Aid partnered with the search engine Ecosia, on a project to support communities to restore land and plant trees along the Daka river in Ghana.

== History and philosophy ==
Tree Aid was established in 1987 by Neville Fay and others in the forestry arboricultural industries, in response to the famine in Ethiopia. Its aim was to provide a long-term solution to the challenges of poverty and environmental decline once the emergency relief efforts ended. This was to be achieved by local teams working with people to manage and maintain trees for fruit, fodder, shade, and soil consolidation. In a speech on 19 July 2017 at the 30th Anniversary of Tree Aid, Neville Fay said of the founding of Tree Aid:

Inspired by the community-based African Green Belt and the Indian Chipko Village movements, we saw the possibility of how arid landscapes could be stabilised to recreate a sustainable future for the heroic inhabitants of those environments.

== Focus of work ==
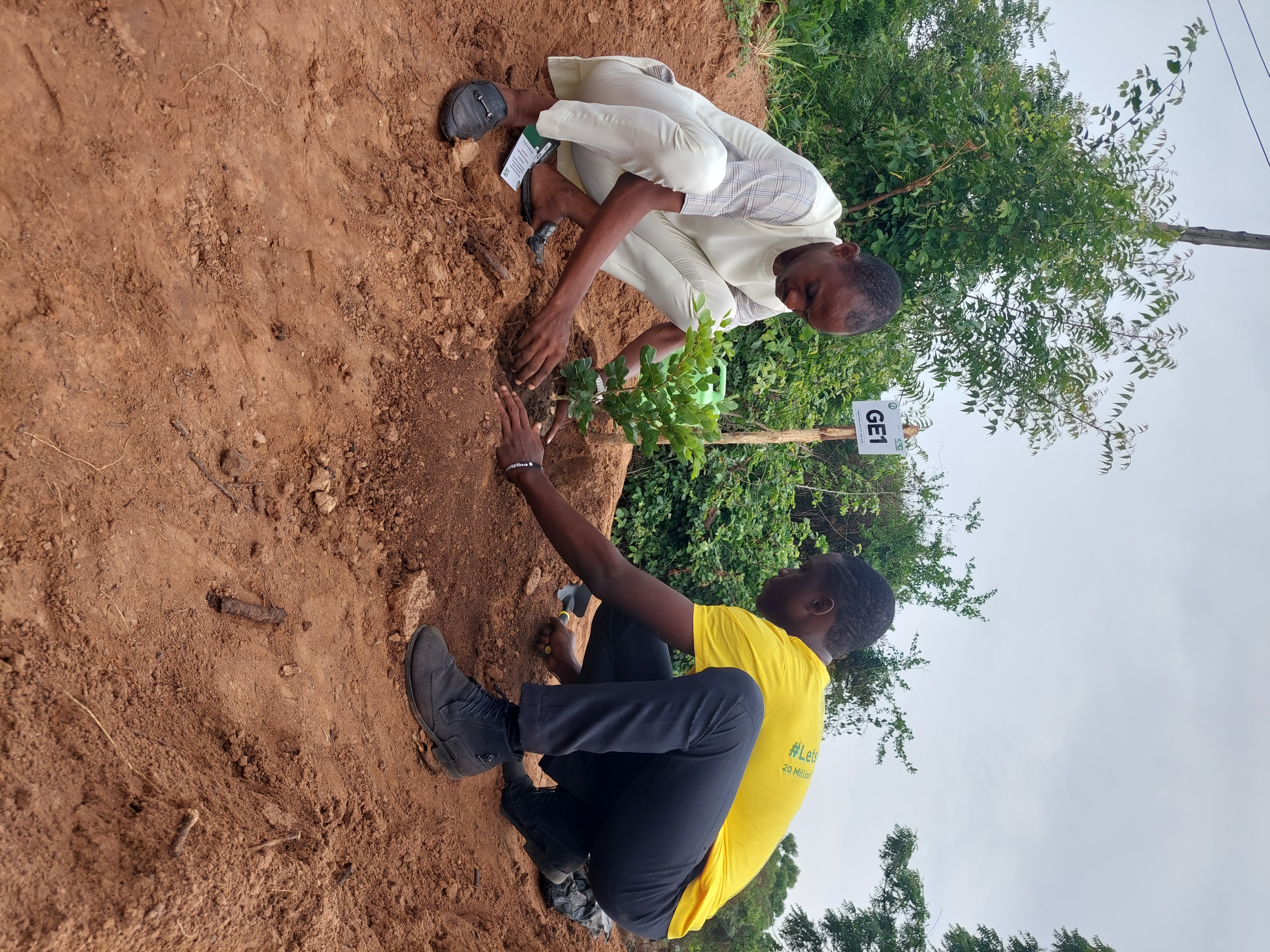
Two gentlemen planting a tree in Ghana during tree planting initiative

Tree Aid's approach is to work with people local to the areas they are working in, supporting them with tools and training to grow trees, protect land, and start sustainable businesses. This approach aims to tackle poverty by increasing the project participants' nutrition and incomes, as well as protecting and restoring the natural environment. Tree Aid's work contributes to the following United Nations' Sustainable Development Goals: goal one which is about ending poverty, goal five on gender equality, goal eight about developing opportunities for decent work and economic growth, goal 13 about climate action and goal 15 about managing life on land sustainably.

Tree Aid's approach is focused on four themes:

- Natural resource management – Working with local people to use the trees on the land to improve soil and crops, rather than clearing them. Helping farmers to grow back trees that have been cut. Pushing for government policy that protects trees.
- Forest governance – Campaigning for forests to be managed by the people who depend on them. Working with communities and local governments so they can agree rules for using forests and their resources.
- Food and nutrition – Working with communities to grow and protect trees to keep land fertile and help crops to grow. If crops fail because of flooding or drought, trees survive, providing nutritious fruits, nuts and leaves, to eat or sell. This gives people stable supplies of food.
- Enterprise development – Working with local people so they have what they need to make and sell products from their trees. That includes everything from production skills and tools, to storage warehouses. Supporting the creation of village enterprise groups.

== Fundraising appeals ==
- On 17 January 2019, Zoë Wanamaker made an appeal on BBC Radio 4 on behalf of Tree Aid where she told the story of Petra, a Tree Aid project participant who learnt how to produce shea butter from the nuts of shea tree. Tree Aid reported that this appeal raised over £20,000.
- Between 1 April and 30 June 2019, Tree Aid ran the "She Grows" campaign, the donations for which were matched by the UK government. The appeal aimed to help one thousand women in Mali to set up small businesses that process and sell shea butter and honey, and give them tools and training to save and replant their local forest.
- Tree Aid launched their second UK Aid Matched appeal, called the "Future Forest" on 12 April 2021. The aim of this appeal was to help save the Metema frankincense forest in Ethiopia, by supporting communities with tools and training to sustainably use frankincense trees, protecting them for the future. This was expected to help tackle the effects of the climate crisis The Future Forest appeal was backed by public figures including Joanna Lumley, Chris Packham, and Zoë Wanamaker.

== Completed projects ==
=== Burkina Faso ===
==== Forest Governance Phase 1 – started 2007 ====
===== Aim =====
To reduce poverty and hunger for people across Burkina Faso by supporting communities to set up forest management plans and learn how to restore and protect their environment.

===== Reported outcomes =====
- Restored and protected over 22,800 hectares of land
- Helped people to gain access to trees and set up forest management plans to protect the forests for the future
- Encouraged women to in engage forest management and increased female participation from 24% to 71%

===== Partners =====
- UK Department for International Development's Civil Society Challenge Fund
- Swedish International Development Cooperation Agency
- UNCDF
- SNV
- GAGF
- MEEVCC

==== Restoring Land with Dryland Development ====
===== Aim =====
- To support rural farmers to transition from subsistence farming to sustainable rural development
- To influence policy and push for change with local authorities to support farmers with access to land as well as financial support
- To support women to develop businesses from tree products to generate an income for themselves and their families

===== Reported outcomes =====
- Supported the development of 47 local land management committees in six sub-catchments setting out rules for sustainable and inclusive land and forest management
- 45,841 farmers were trained in water, soil, and forest management methods which they used to restore 6,886 hectares of land
- Women in the project areas also developed sustainable businesses

===== Partners =====
- Ministry of Foreign Affairs (MFA) of the Netherlands
- World Vision Australia (WVA)
- World Agroforestry Centre (ICRAF)
- SNV

=== Ethiopia ===
==== Protecting the Wof Washa Forest ====
===== Aims =====
- To regenerate degraded trees and prevent illegal tree cutting in the area by supporting community forest management training
- To increase incomes and address poverty in the local communities by supporting them to form enterprise groups to process and sell non-timber forest products

===== Reported outcomes =====
- 6,261 hectares of forest under sustainable management
- 1,622 people increased their incomes
- 2,501 people joined forest management cooperatives

===== Partners =====
- Royal Botanical Gardens Kew
- UK government
- The Darwin Initiative
- SUNARMA

=== Mali ===
==== Strengthening Forest Management - concluded in 2020 ====
===== Aims =====
- To protect and restore Ségou's forests, while tackling poverty in the region
- To work with local authorities to agree rules for using forests that benefit local people
- To train communities to protect and restore their local forests
- To support people with tools and training to form and develop enterprise groups
- To increase household incomes by providing support to process and market tree products like shea butter

===== Reported outcomes =====
- 1,500 farmers trained in land and forest management techniques, like tree planting and regeneration and soil and water conservation
- In Sutebwo forest, tree cover has doubled since farmers have started putting tree regeneration techniques into practice
- When the project came to an end 75% of the people Tree Aid worked with reported they feel they now have fair and equal access to their local forests
- 672,000 trees grown
- 204 households no longer live in poverty
- 11,619 hectares of forest protected and restored

===== Partners =====
- The Darwin Initiative
- Sahel Eco
