= Angongwi =

River in Ghana

Coordinates: 6°07′N 0°28′E

Angongwi is a river in Ghana. It is located in the south-eastern part of the country, 100 kilometres (62 mi) north of Accra. It drains into the Volta River just before the Volta drains into the Gulf of Guinea.
