= Todzie River =

River in Ghana and Togo

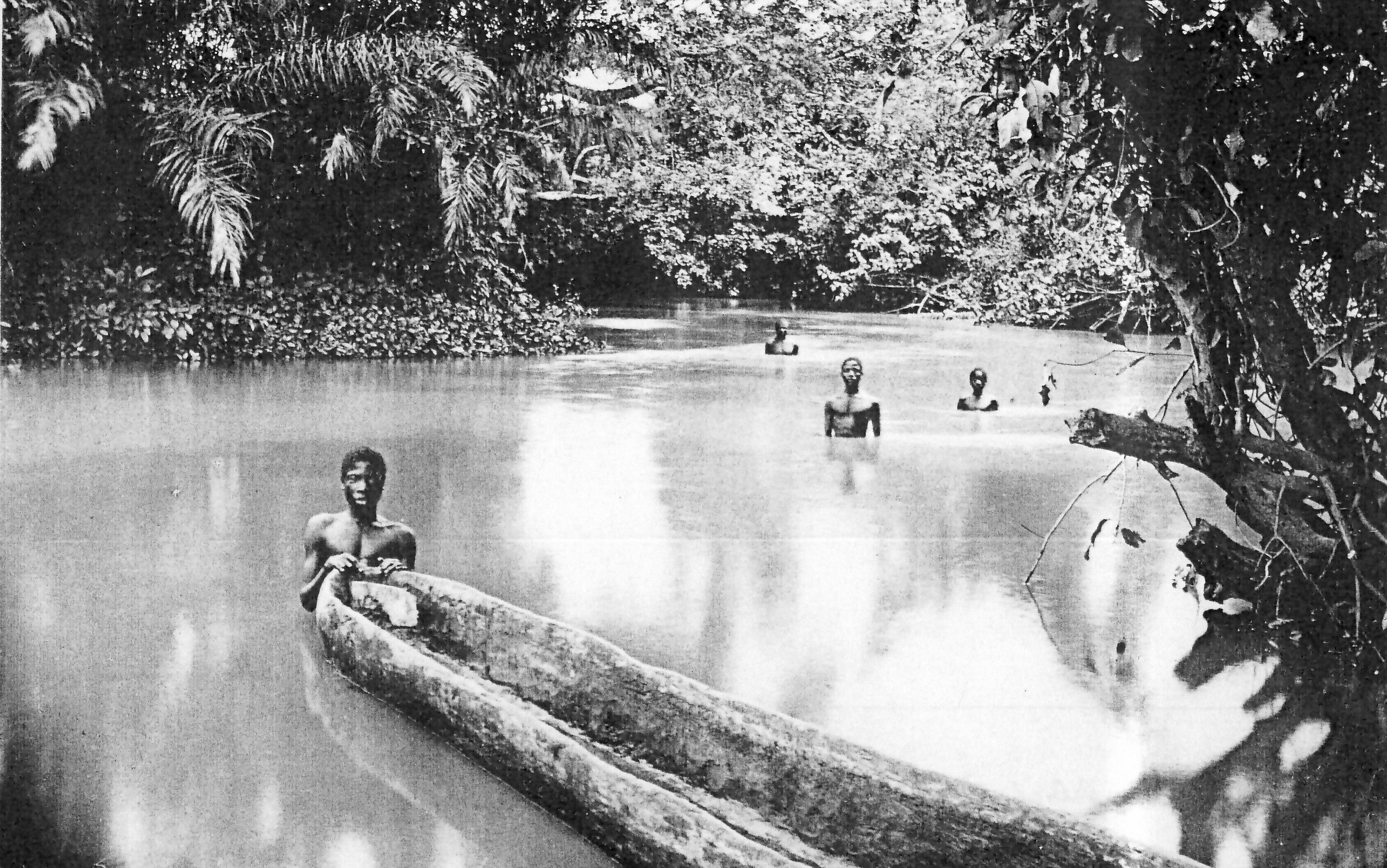

Location
- Country: Ghana
- Cities: Dabala; Agbogbla; Bludo; Avuto

Physical characteristics
- Source
  - location: south west Togo
- Mouth
  - location: Volta Region, Volta Region, Ghana
  - elevation: 5 m (16 ft)
- Length: 267 km (166 mi)
- Basin size: 2,200 km^{2} (850 sq mi)
- Discharge
  - average: 11 m^{3}/s (390 cu ft/s)

Basin features
- River system: Volta River

Todzie is a stream located in Ghana and forms partly the Border to south west Togo. The estimated terrain elevation above sea level is 5 metres. Variant forms of spelling for Todzie or in other languages: Todjé, Todje, Toje, Todji, Toji, Todjie, Todschië or Todie.
