= List of rulers of the Gurmanche state of Jugu =

This is a list of rulers of the Gurmanche state of Jugu, until the territory was located in present-day Benin. This includes tenures under the Gurma Dynasty.

== Rulers of the Gurmanche state of Jugu (Sugu) ==
Territory located in present-day Benin.

Tenure	Incumbent	Notes
c.1700	Foundation of Jugu state	
Gurma Dynasty
1800 to 1815	Bangba Nyora II	
1815 to 18??	Kpe Toni II	
18?? to 18??	Kurugu IV Atakora	
18?? to 1880	Nyora III	
1880 to 28 July 1899	Kpe Toni III	
11 August 1899 to 1900	Baba Jimba	
13 February 1900 to 19??	Atakora	
19?? to 19??	Kpe Toni IV	
19?? to 19??	Kpe Toni V	
19?? to 19??	Kpe Toni VI	

== Sources ==
- http://www.rulers.org/benitrad.html

== See also ==
- Benin
- Lists of office-holders
