= Anum River =

Coordinates: 6°11′46″N 1°11′26″W

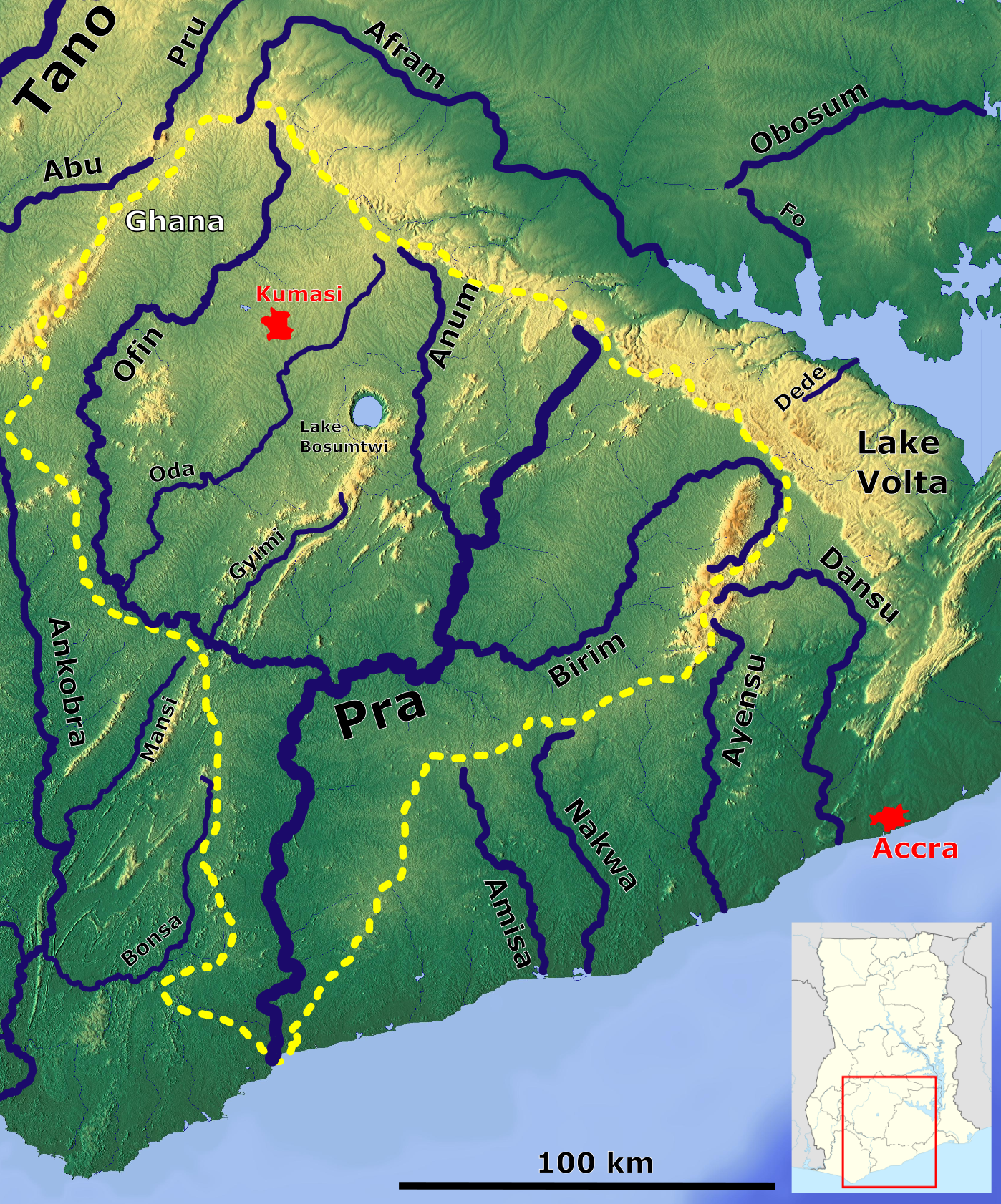

Location
- Country: Ghana

Physical characteristics
- Mouth: Gulf of Guinea
  - location: Atlantic Ocean
- Discharge
  - location: Mouth

Anum River is a river of Ghana. Part of the area between the Anum and Pra rivers forms the Pra Anum Forest Reserve. In 1977 it was reported that new concessions were being acquired on the Anum River, and Lower Offin, Pra, Tano, and Ankobra Rivers for dredging purposes.
