= Tain River =

River in Ghana

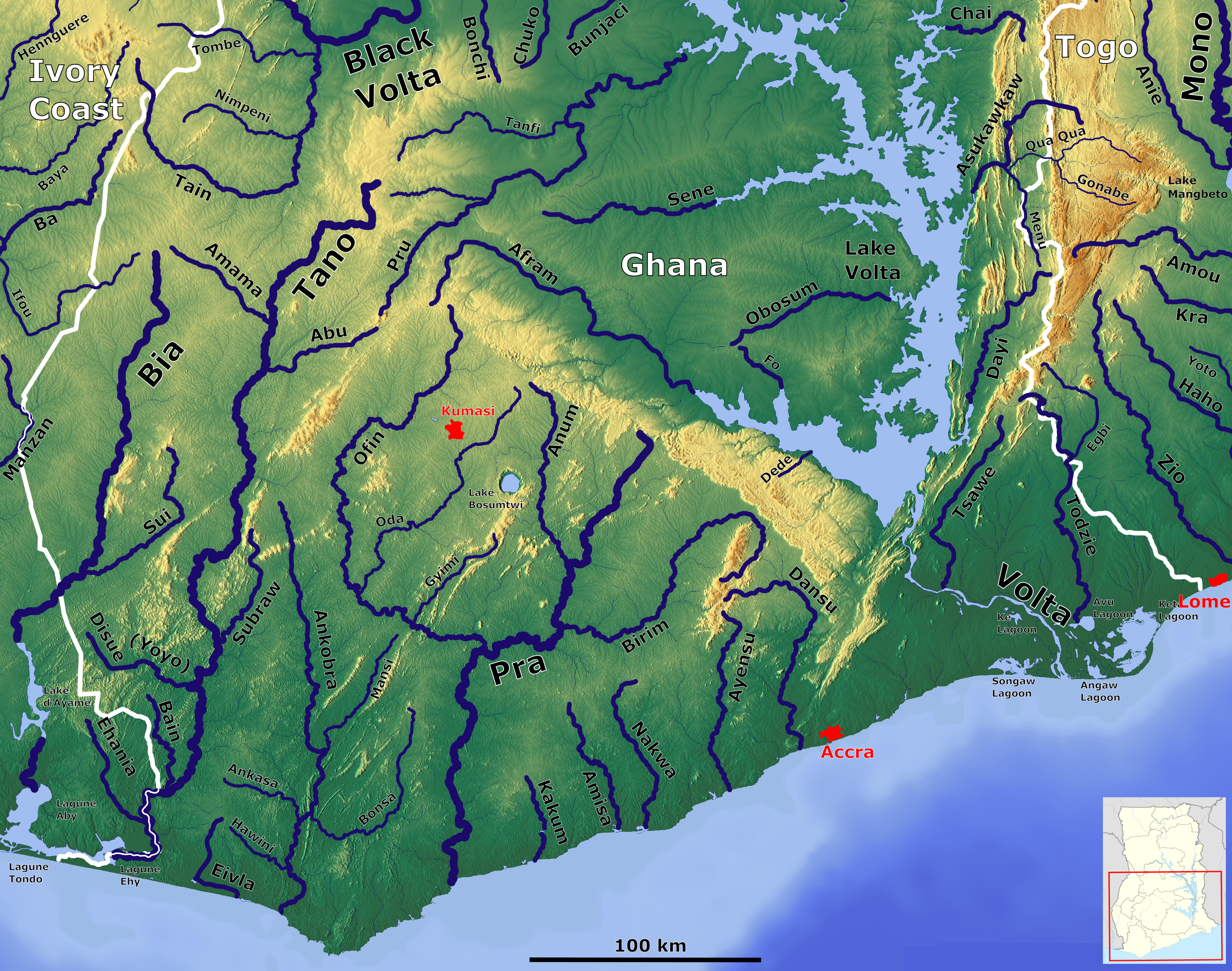
- South Ghana with the Tain (top left)

Location
- Country: Ghana

Physical characteristics
- Mouth: Black Volta
  - coordinates: 8°09′02″N 2°07′17″W

Tain River is a river, which flows through Jaman North District of the Brong Ahafo Region of Ghana. It is a tributary of the Black Volta, and empties into the Atlantic Ocean.
