= Pru River =

River in Ghana

Pra River
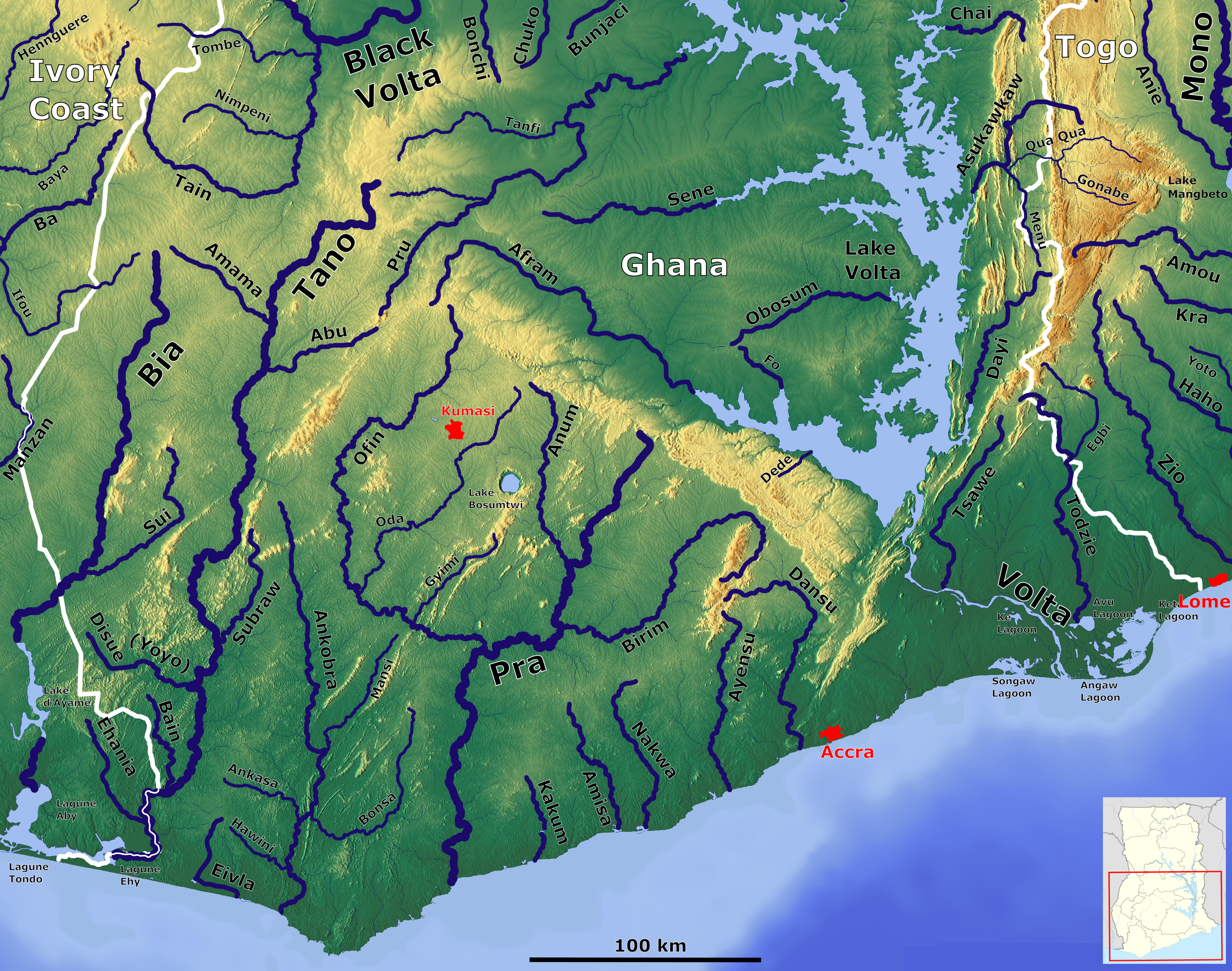
- South Ghana with the Pra (centre top)

Location
- Country: Ghana

Physical characteristics
- Mouth: Volta River
  - location: Lake Volta
- Discharge
  - location: Mouth

The Pra River is a river of Ghana. The Pra River rises in the Ashanti, roughly 33 miles (53 km) west of Mampong in the centre of the country, and runs to the northeast, with a length of 120 miles (190 km). Part of the area between the Pra and Anum rivers forms the Pra Anum Forest Reserve.
