= Sisili River =

River in Ghana

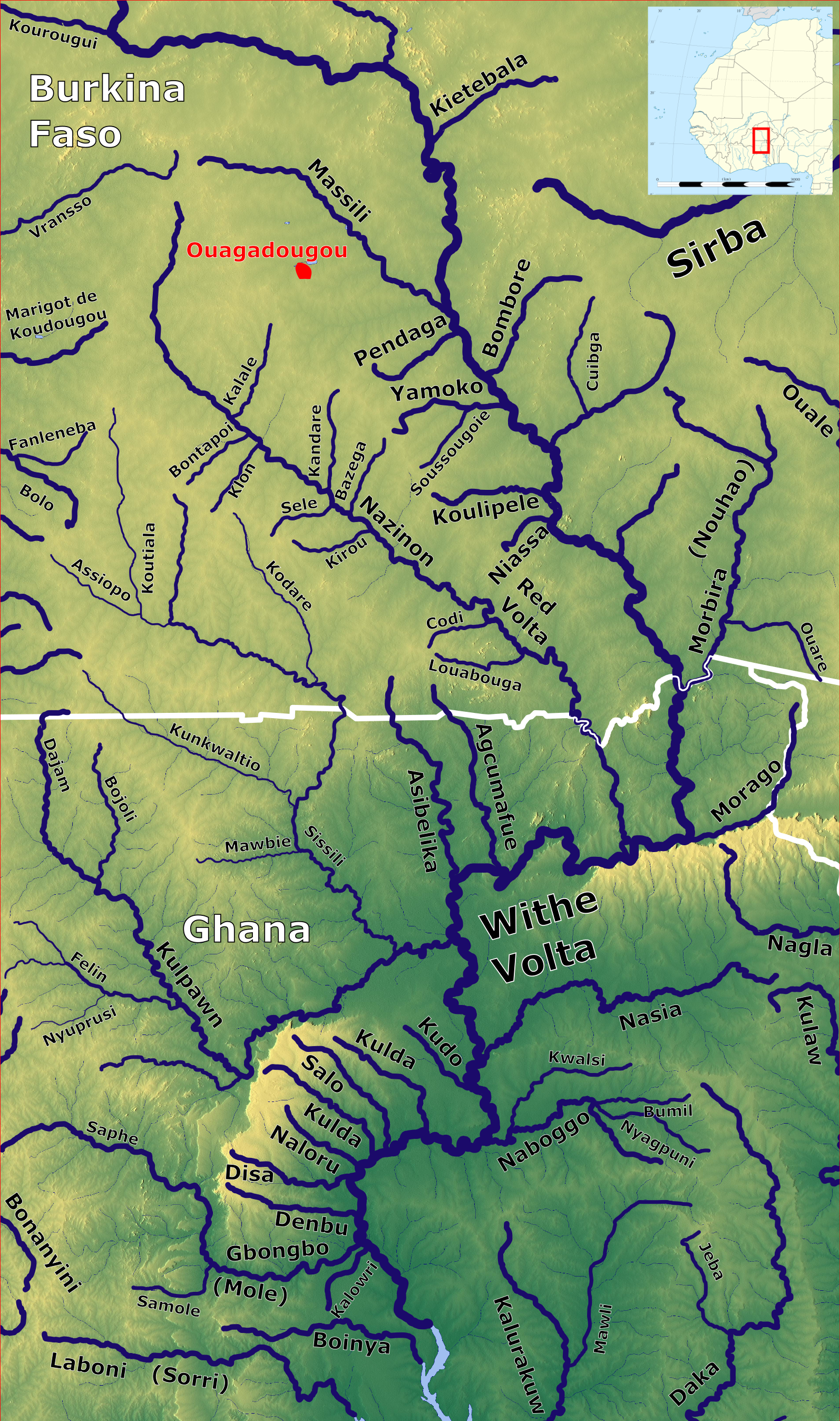
- The main tributaries of the White Volta with the Sisili (left center)

Location
- Country: Ghana

Physical characteristics
- Source
  - coordinates: 10°16′36″N 1°14′30″W
- Mouth: Kulpawn River
- Discharge
  - location: Mouth

The Sisili River is one of the major rivers of northwestern Ghana, along with the Black Volta and Kulpawn Rivers. Historically, the Nakong area of the Sisili River, on the east side, has been subject to "Zabarima slave raids led by Gazare and Babatu".
