= Kulpawn River =

River in Ghana

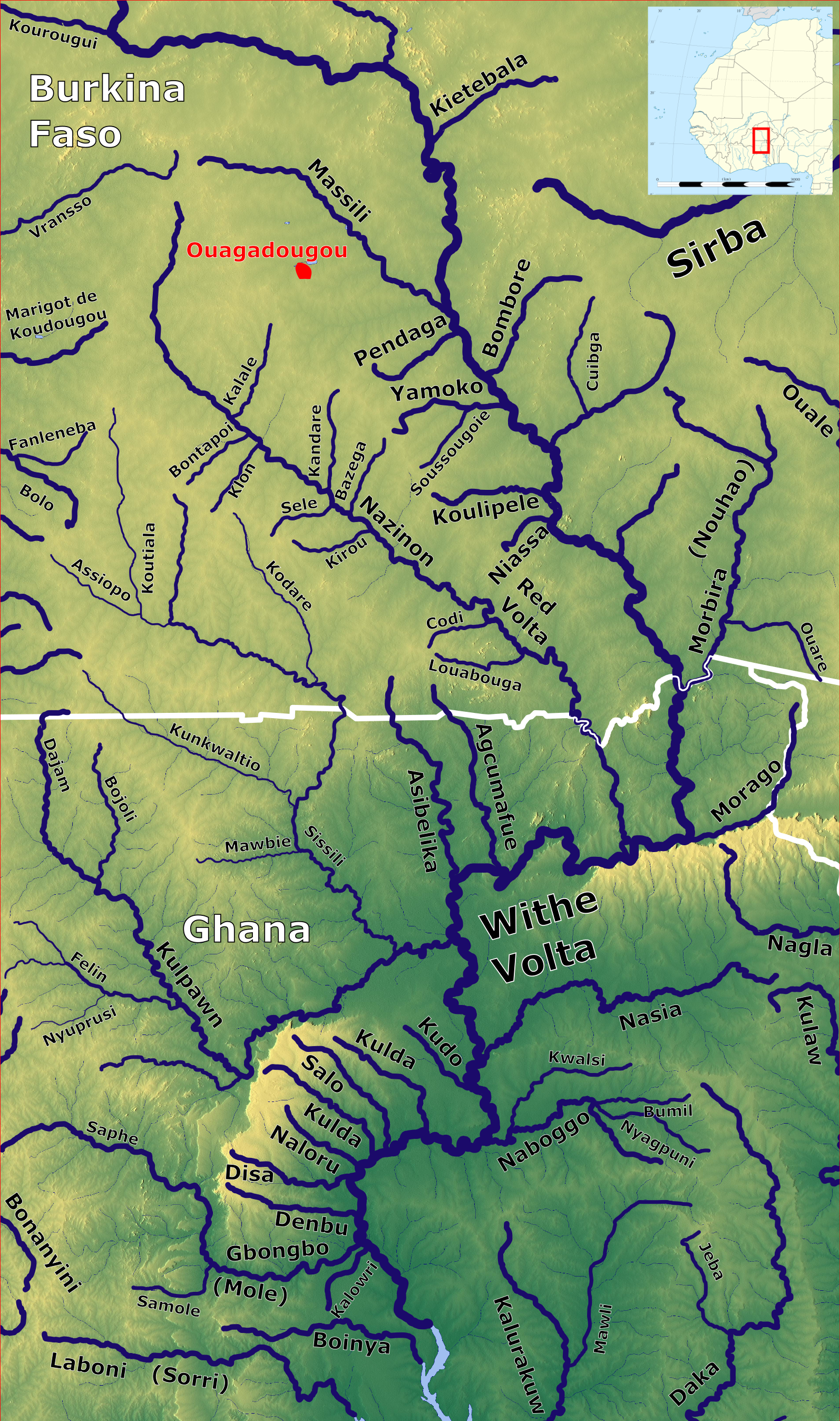
- The main tributaries of the White Volta with the Kulpawn (centre bottom left)

Location
- Country: Ghana

Physical characteristics
- Mouth: White Volta
  - coordinates: 10°19′51″N 1°04′58″W
- Discharge
  - location: Mouth

The Kulpawn River is one of the major rivers of northwestern Ghana, along with the Black Volta and Sisili Rivers. It flows through Wa Municipal District. The riparian woodland around the bank of the Kulpawn in the Wahabu is particularly popular with ornithologists, due to a rich variety of birds.

The river flows through the Gbele Resource Centre from the west to the southeast.
