= Sene River =

River in Ghana

Location
- Country: Ghana

Physical characteristics
- Mouth: Volta River
  - location: Lake Volta
- Discharge
  - location: Mouth

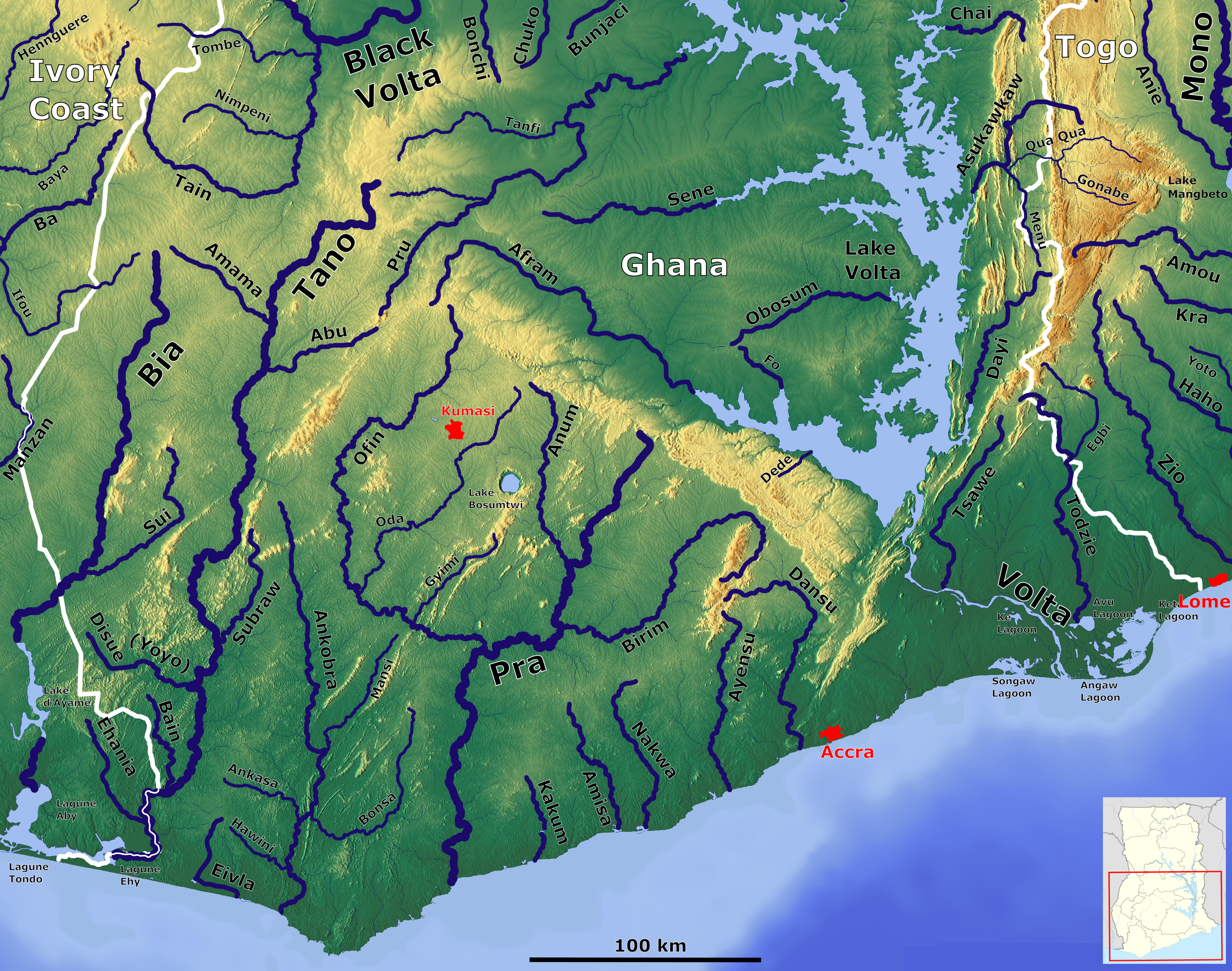
Rivers of south Ghana; the Sene River flows into Lake Volta from the west, slightly above the name of Ghana.

The Sene River is a river of Ghana. It flows through Sene District.
