= Atakora River =

River in Ghana

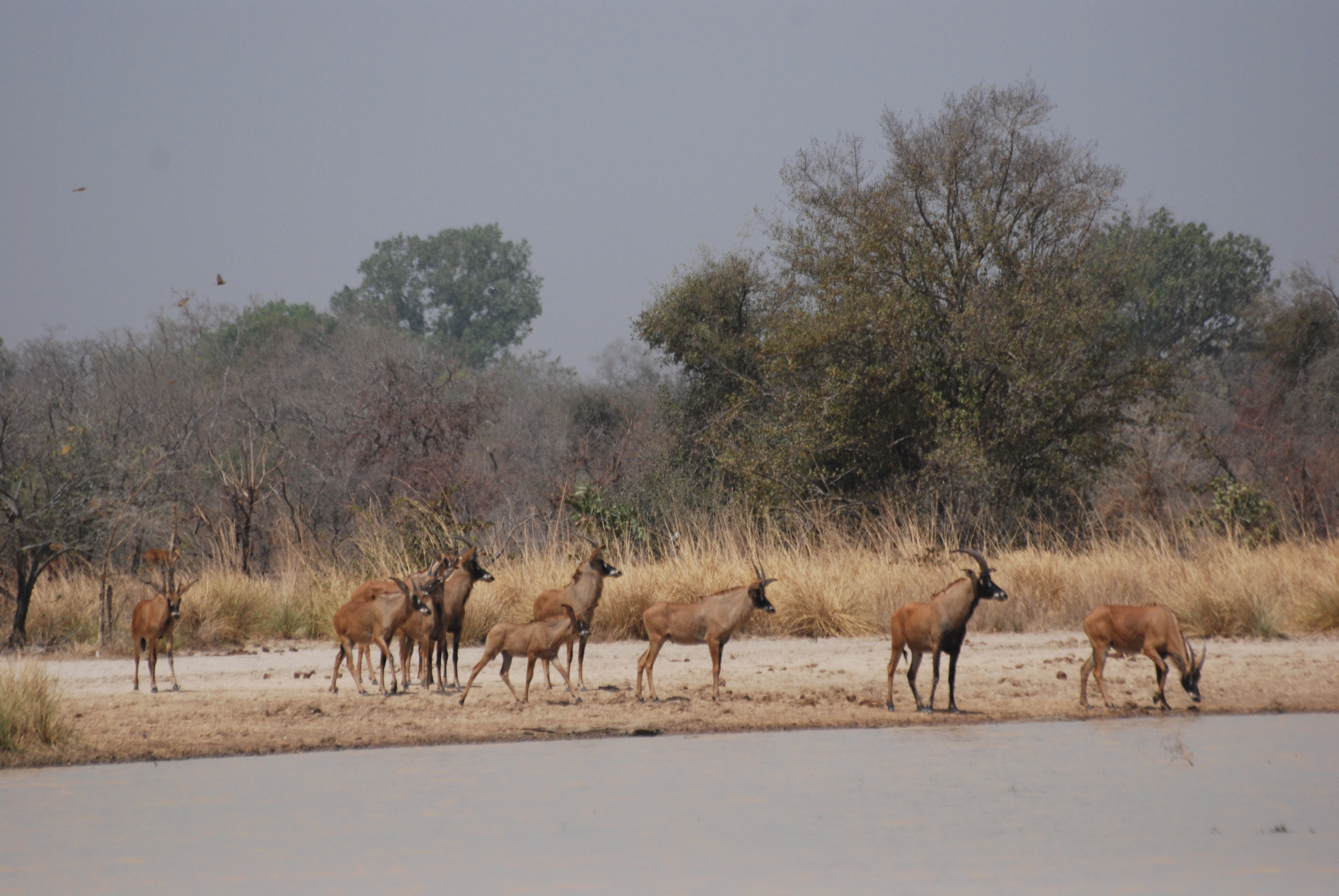
- A herd of antelope (hippotragus) by the Atakora river. One is leaning in to drink the water.

Location
- Country: Ghana

Physical characteristics
- Mouth: Lake Volta
  - location: Gulf of Guinea
  - coordinates: 7°9′59″N 0°4′55″W
- Basin size: 600 km^{2} (230 sq mi)
- Discharge
  - location: Mouth

The Atakora River is a tributary of Lake Volta in Ghana, it flows about 60 km east to the Lake Volta. Its entire course is in south Ghana.
