= Ayensu River =

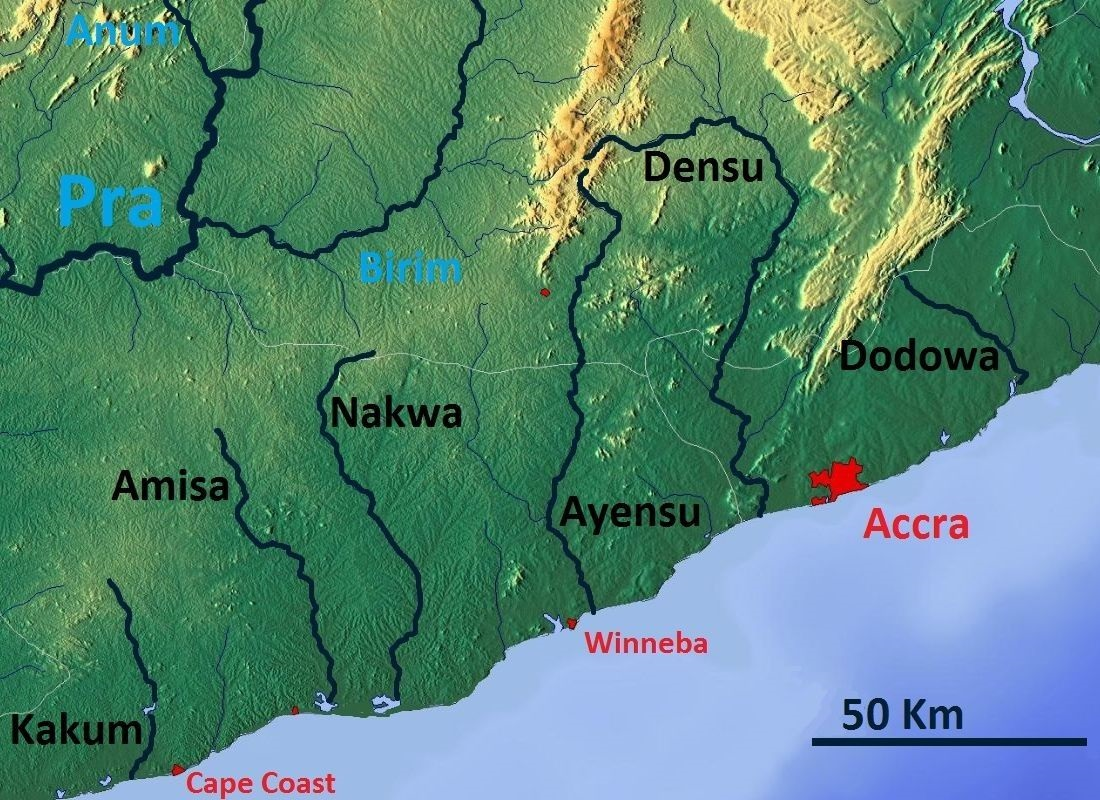

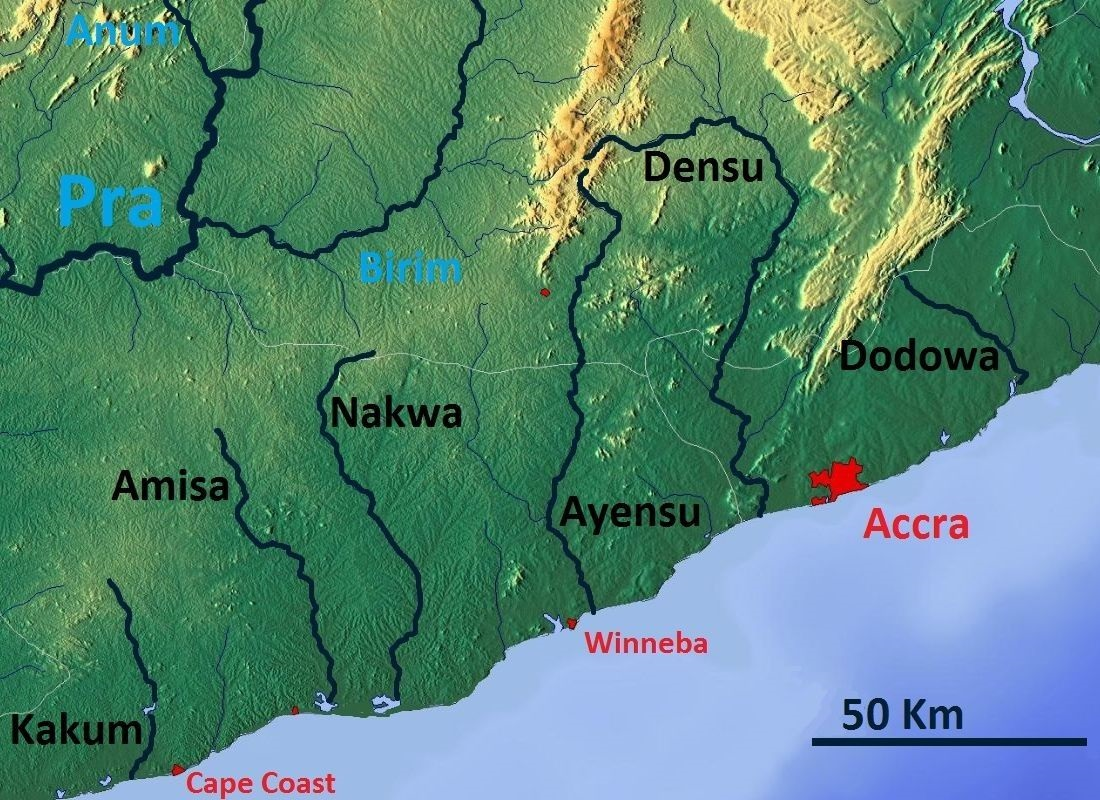

Location
- Country: Ghana

Physical characteristics
- Mouth: Atlantic Ocean
  - location: Winneba, Ghana
  - coordinates: 5°21′06″N 0°36′25″W

Ayensu River is a river in Ghana. It discharges into Ouiba Lagoon, and is surrounded by the Winneba Wetlands. As early as 1939 there were plans to build a bridge along the river near Jahadzi. Geologically, Ayensuadzi-Brusheng Quartz Schists are found in the river area.
