= Ankobra River =

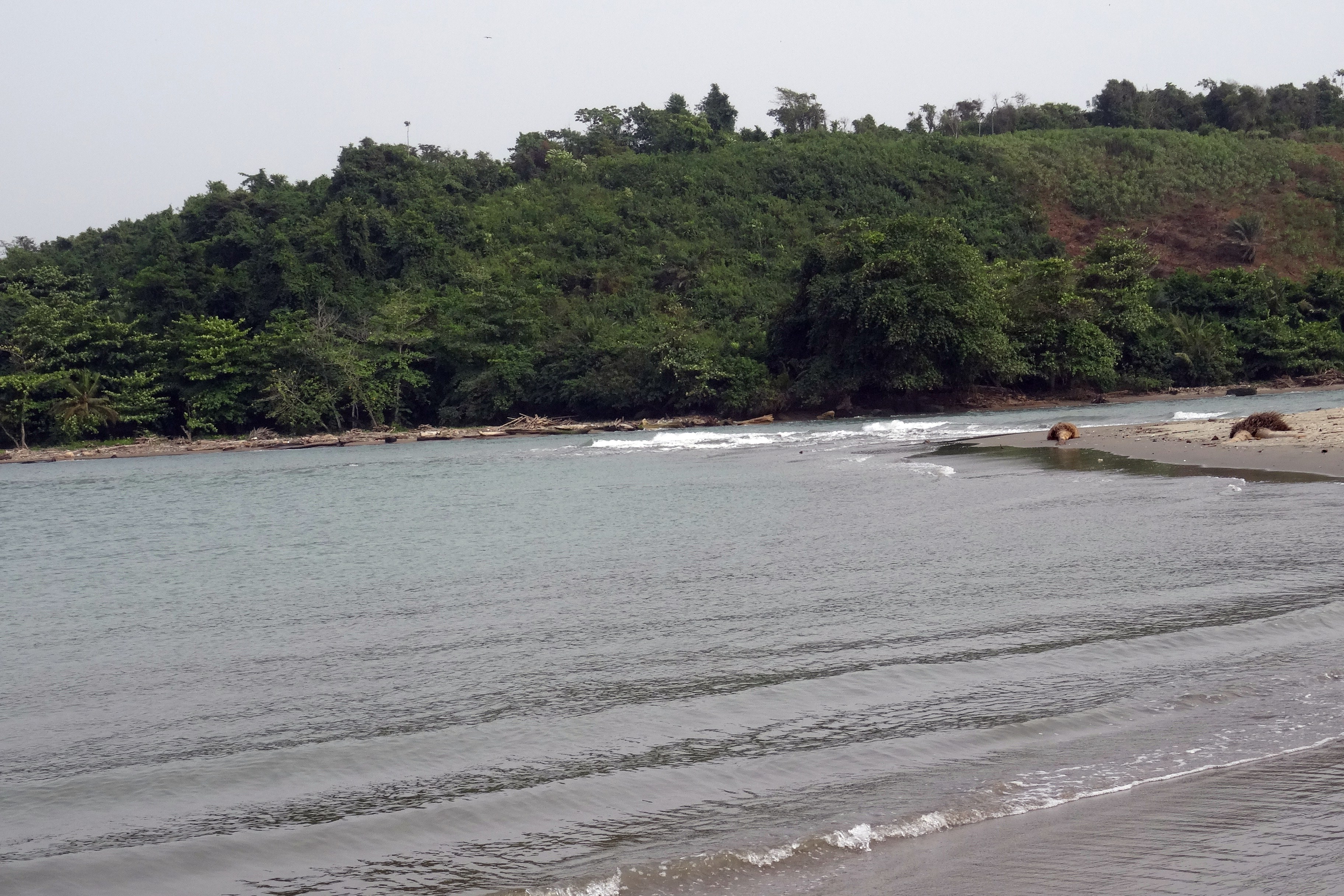
- The estuary of Ankobra River

Location
- Country: Ghana

Physical characteristics
- Mouth: Gulf of Guinea
  - location: Atlantic Ocean
  - coordinates: 4°53′55″N 2°16′17″W
- Basin size: 1,900 km^{2} (730 sq mi)
- Discharge
  - location: Mouth

The Ankobra River is situated in southwest Ghana. The river originates from northeast of Wiawso in the Western North Region of Ghana. It flows about 190 kilometres (120 mi) south to the Gulf of Guinea, and enters the ocean about 60 km to the west of the city of Takoradi. Near its mouth are the remains of Fort Elize Carthago, a Dutch trading post abandoned in 1711.

The Ankobra River is fed by the Nini River. Small ships can navigate 80 kilometres (40 nmi; 50 mi) inland, whilst the upper reaches contain rapids. Several hydro electric schemes have been proposed for the upper reaches. It is one of Ghana's largest water basins.

In 2003, mercury and arsenic were reported in the gold mining area of the Ankobra River Basin.

== Gallery ==
The course of Ankobra River

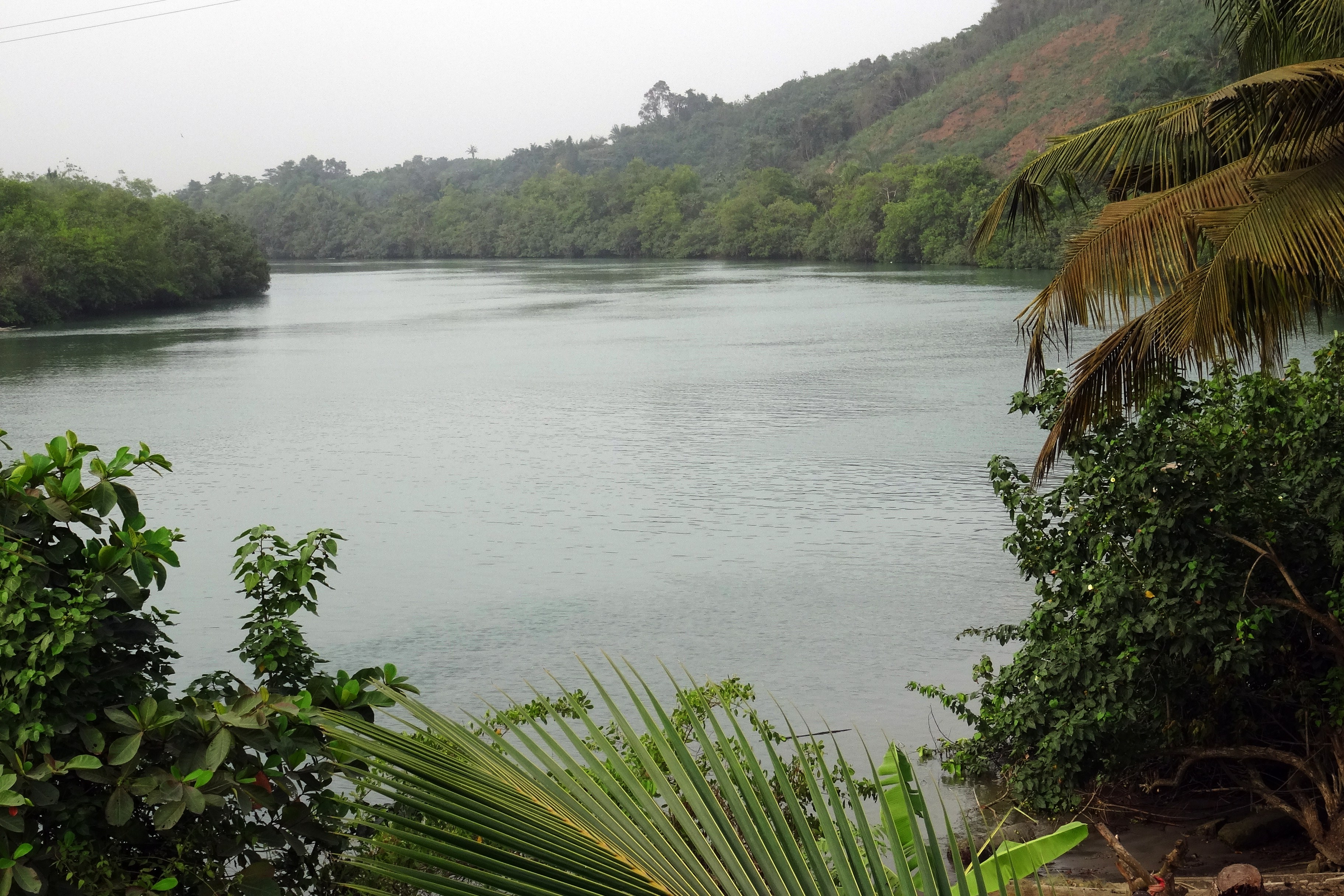
Looking north from the southern end of the Ankobra River

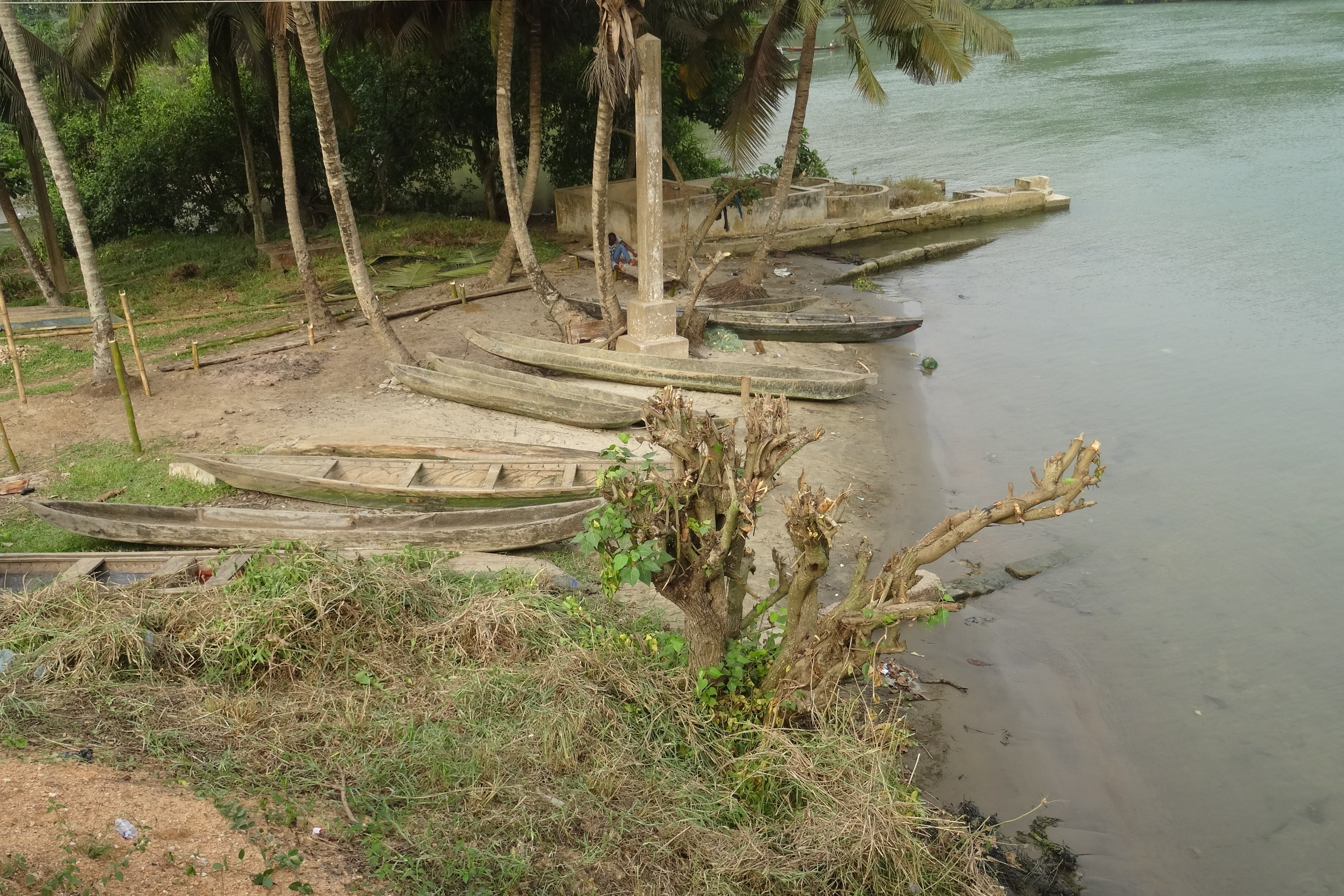
Fishing boats at Ankobra River

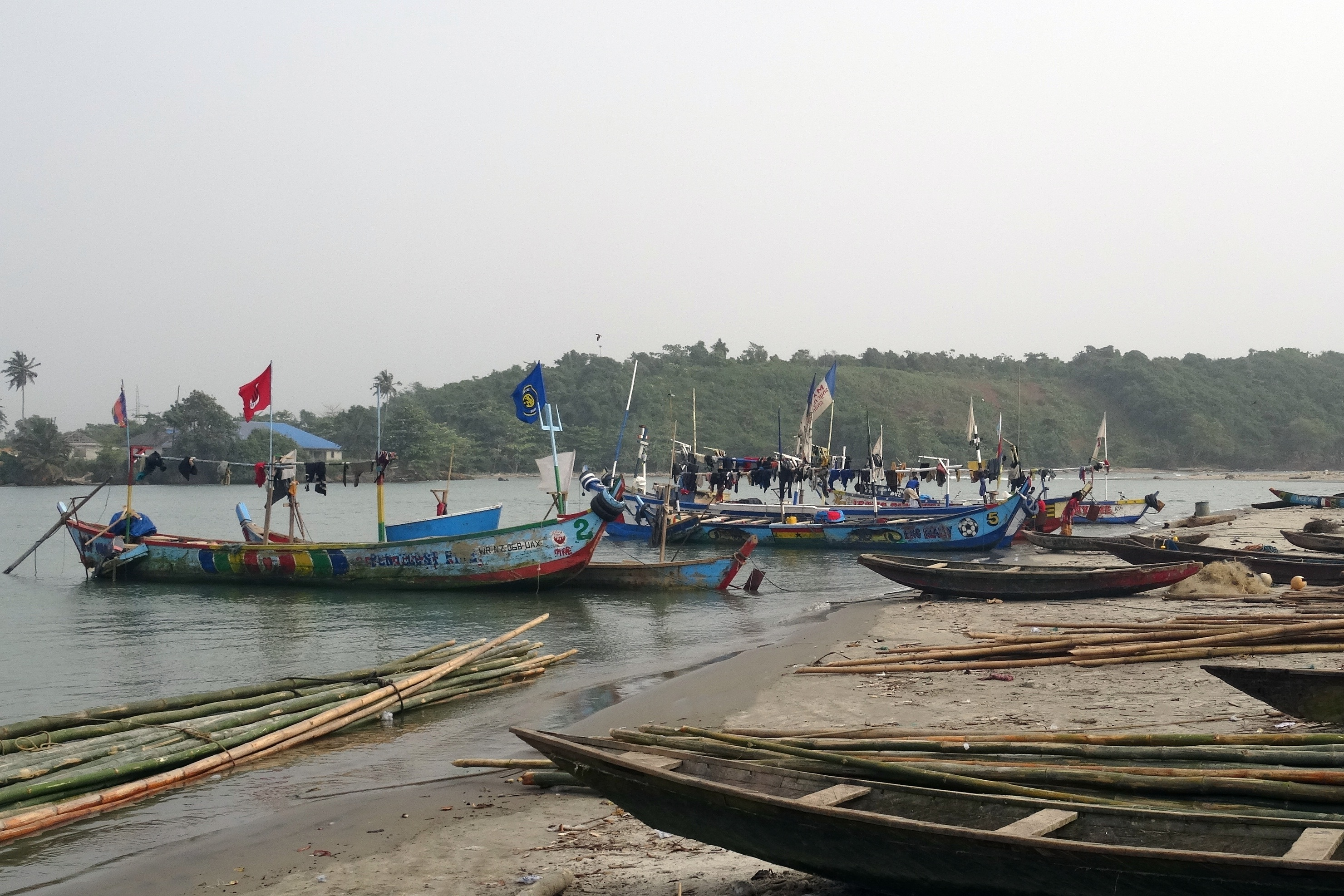
Fishing boats at the estuary of Ankobra River
