= Daka River =

Coordinates: 8.152°N 0.362°W

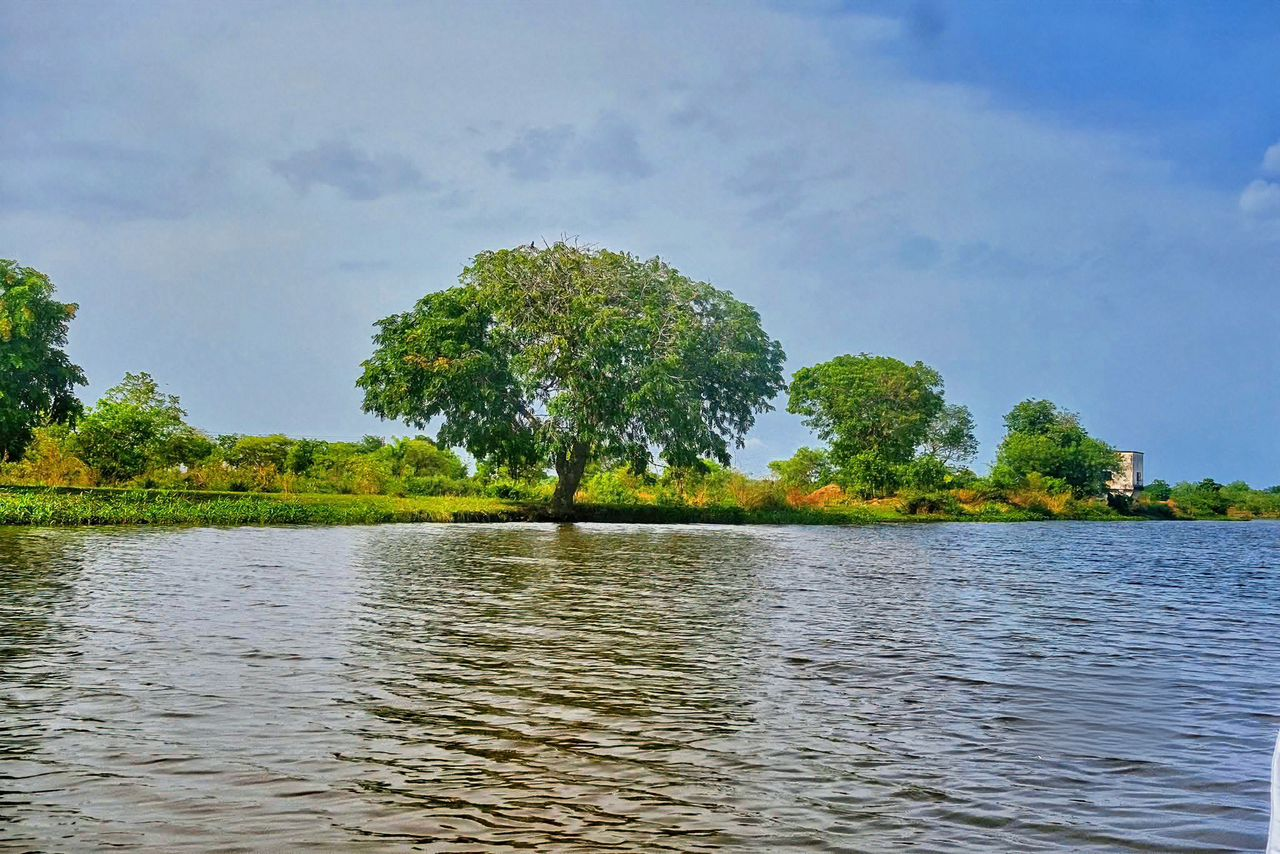

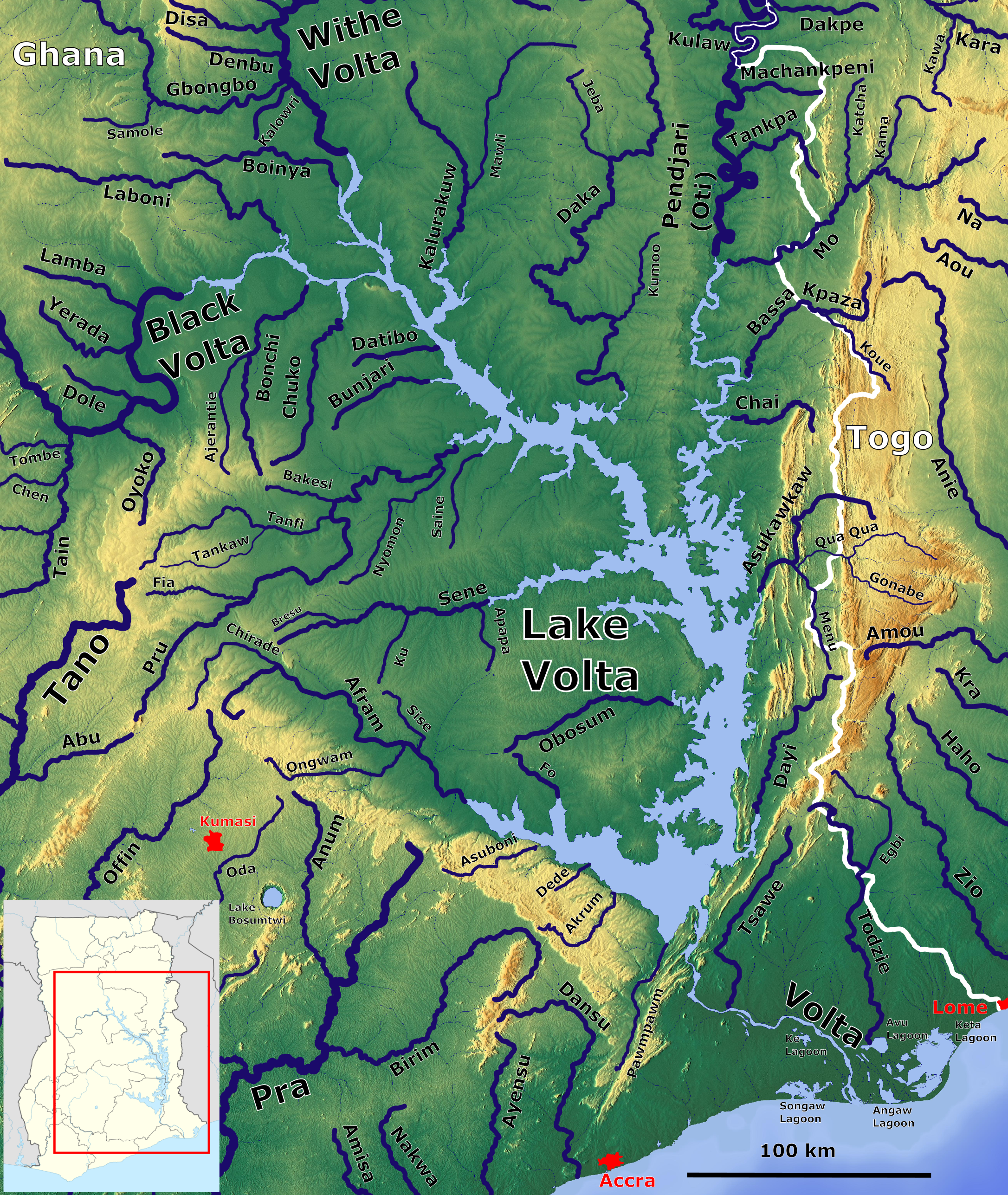
- Lake Volta with its tributaries (Daka River in the centre from th top)

Location
- Country: Ghana

Physical characteristics
- Mouth: Volta River
  - location: Lake Volta
- Discharge
  - location: Mouth

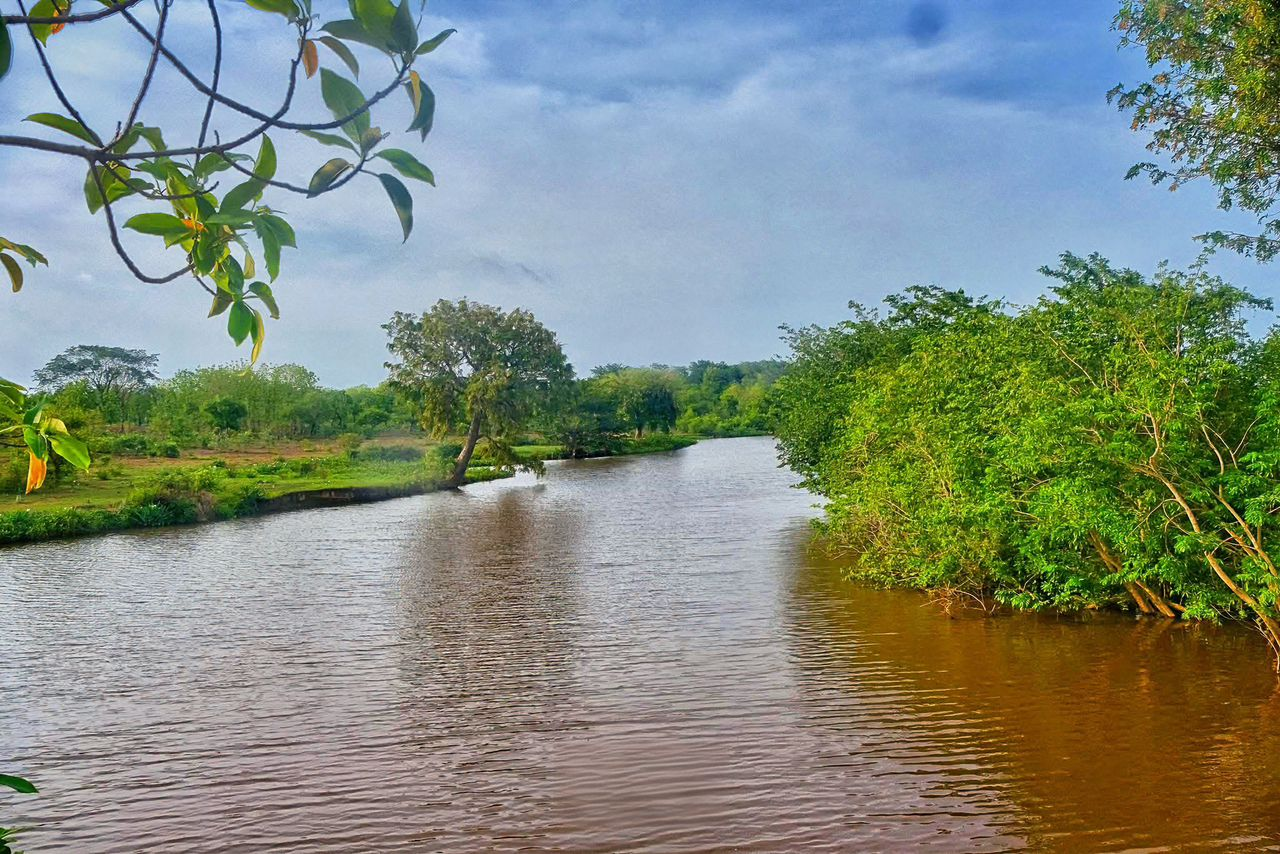
This river is found in the north east part of Ghana.

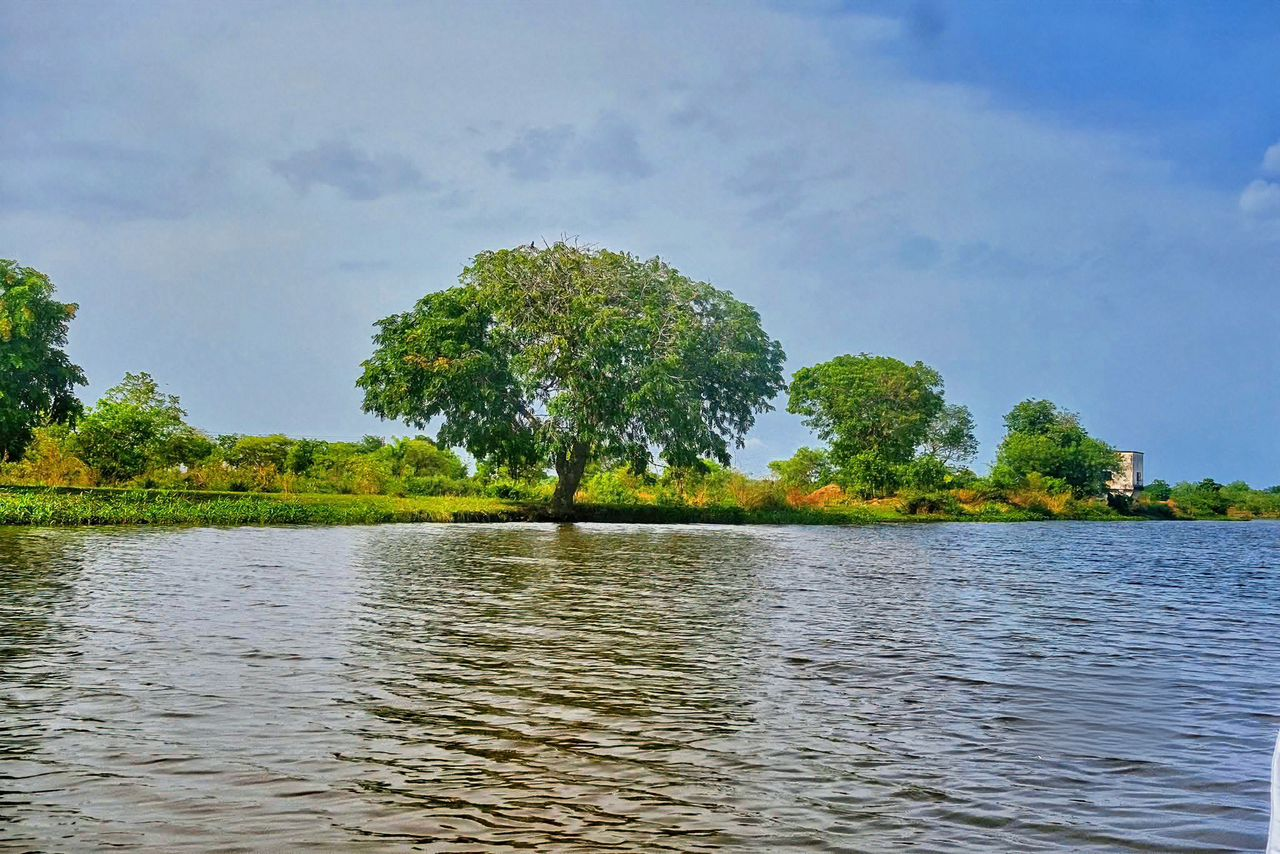
nice view of the daka river

The Daka River is a river of Ghana. It flows through the northeastern part of the country and is one of the tributaries of the Lake Volta. The land between the Daka and Oti rivers is known as the Oti-Daka corridor.
