= Abusua =

Name in the Akan culture

Abusua is the name in Akan culture for a group of people that share common maternal ancestry governed by seven major ancient abosom (deities). The Abusua line is considered to be passed through the mother's blood (mogya). There are several Abusua that transcend the different ethnic subgroups outside of the ancient seven. People of the same Abusua share a common ancestor somewhere within their bloodline, which may go back as far as thousands of years. It is a taboo to marry someone from the same Abusua. The different Abusua are the Agona (parrot), the Aduana (dog), the Asenie (bat), Oyoko (falcon/hawk), the Asakyiri (vulture), the Asona (crow), the Bretuo (leopard), and the Ekuona (bull).

== Abusua types ==
=== Agona or Anona ===
People of the Agona are predominant in Denkyira and therefore in Asante, Nkawie. The symbol of the Agona is the parrot. When greeted by a person from the Agona or Anona, the reply should be "Yaa ako nana". Some towns of the Agona are Tafo, Bodwesango, Fumesua, Edwumako Techiman, Dunkwa, Asienimpon, Trede Ahwaa, Akyem Apedwa,Akyem Oda,Akyem Asene

=== Aduana ===
Aduana believe that at the time of creation, their ancestors descended from the skies on a golden chain. Others believe that they originally came from Asumanya and they were led by a dog with a flame in his mouth and gold in his cheeks. They proceeded to Dormaa where they believe the flame is still kept alight. Still others believe that from Asumanya a section of the Aduana headed for Akwamu. Some of the principal towns of the Aduana are Dormaa and most of the Bono people, Akwamu and Twifo Heman. In Asante the principal towns for the Aduana are Kumawu, Asumanya, Kwaman, Boaman, Agogo, Banso, Obo-Kwahu, Kwahu Obomeng Apromaase, Akyem Apapam, Tikurom, Kaase, Apagya, Bompata, Kwaso, Akyease, Manso Agroyesum, Manso-Mmem, Manso-Abodom, Gomoa Ohua and Nyinahen. The symbol of the Aduana is the Lion and Dog.

=== Asene ===
The symbol of the Asene is the bat and its main towns are Kumasi Amakom and Dompoase. When greeted by a person from the Asene, the reply should be "Yaa Adu nana". Other towns of the Asenie are Antoa, Agona, Nkoranza, Wenchi, Atwoma, Kofiase, Abira, Baman, Denyase and Boanim. In Adansi Dompoase, members of the Asenie family are the crowned royals of the land and their leaders possesses special leadership skills endowed by their great ancestors.

=== Asakyiri ===
Asakyiri claim that they were the first to be created by God. They are to be found in the Adanse area and their main towns are Akorokyere (Akrokere), Asakyiri Amansie, Ayaase, Obogu Nkwanta and Asokore. When greeted by a person from the Asakyiri, the reply should be "Yaa Ofori nana". Other towns of the Asakyiri are Abofuo, Aduanede, Abrenkese, and Apeadu. Their symbol is the vulture and eagle. They are the smallest clan amongst the Akan.

=== Asona ===
The symbol of the Asona is the crow or wild boar. It is said that more people generally, belong to the Asona than to any other abusua. The principal towns are Adansi Akrofuom, Kyebi, Edweso and Offinso. When greeted by a member of the Asona, the reply should be "Yaa Ofori nana". Other towns of the Asona are Akyem Begoro, Akyem Asiakwa, New Juaben, Akyem Wenchi, Kukurantumi, Akyem Tafo, Akuapem-Akropong, Akuapem Amanokrom, Akyem Kwarbeng, Ejura, Feyiase, Manso-Nkwanta, Bonwire, Atwima-Agogo, Abrakaso, Trabuom, Beposo, Toase, and Odumase Ahanta Ntaakrom, Gomoa Asin. The head of all Asona towns is Adansi Akrofuom.

=== Bretuo ===
Bretuo are found mainly in Adansi Ayaase, Mampong, Kwahu, Adankranya, Amprofi Tanoso (Tanoso - near Akumadan) Amoafo, Asiwa, and Afigyaase/Effiduase. Its symbol is the leopard. It is worth noting that the commander of the Asante army against Denkyira was the Mamponhene and in the past, generally, matters relating to war in Asante was the domain of the Mamponhene. When greeted by a person from the Bretuo, the reply should be "Yaa etwie nana". Towns of the Bretuo are Jamase, Apaa, Kwahu Abene, Domeabra, Agogo-Hwidiem, Adankranya, Suhum-Kwahyia, Asiwa (capital of Bosome Freho District) and Abuotem, Ofoase, Brodekwano, Bosomtwe Beposo.

=== Ekoɔna ===
Ekuona are not found in great numbers in Asante. They are mainly found among the Fante but in Asante, their main towns are Adanse Fomena and Asokore. The symbol of the Ekuona is the buffalo. When greeted, the reply should be "Yaa Doku nana". Other towns of the family are Banko, Mprim, Kona, Asokore-Mampon, Berekum, Kokofu-Abuoso, Adumasa, Heman, Abenkyem, Cape Coast, Jukwaa, and Duayaw-Nkwanta.

=== Oyoko ===
The falcon is the symbol of the Oyoko. It is also the family from which the current Asantehene comes. Its main towns are Kokofu, Kumasi, Dwaben and Nsuta. When greeted, the reply should be "Yaa Obiri nana". Other towns are Bekwae, Mamponten, Bogyae, Dadieso, Obogu, Asaaman Adubiase, Pampaso, Kontanase, Kenyase, and Ntonso.The symbol of the Oyoko clan is a Falcon. Some people call it 'Ekusi ebusua' therefore members of this clan are called "Ekusifo" in some part in the Western region.

== See also ==
- Asantemanso
- Adansemanso
- Adanse
- Asante
- Kwahu
- Denkyira
- Assin
- Akyem
- Asante Empire
