= List of Akan Clans =

The Akan people are a Kwa group living primarily in present-day Ghana and in parts of Ivory Coast and Togo in West Africa. They have as many as more than twenty clans groups within the community.

List of the clans of Akan people include:

1. Aduana
2. Agona
3. Asakyiri
4. Asenie
5. Asona
6. Bretuo
7. Ekuona
8. Oyoko
