= Kingdom of Assin =

Akan kingdom in present-day Ghana

Assin Kingdom
- 16th century (as part of the Akani trading network)–19th century (absorbed into the British Gold Coast)
- Status: Kingdom
- Capital: Kushea; Assinmanso; Apemanim; Attandasu
- Common languages: Twi (Assin dialect)
- Religion: Akan religion, ancestor worship
- Government: Monarchy
- Assinhene
  - c. 1670s–1700s: Agyensam of Koshea
- History
  - Established: 16th century (as part of the Akani trading network)
  - Rise as part of the Akani confederacy: 16th century
  - War with Twifo: 1657–1659
  - Invasion of Afutu: 1676
  - Defeat and annexation by Denkyira: 1697–1698
  - Alliance with Fante Confederacy: 1706–1715
  - Treaty of Fomena: release from Asante claims: 1874
  - Incorporated into the British Gold Coast: Late 19th century
  - Disestablished: 19th century (absorbed into the British Gold Coast)
- Currency: Gold dust, Cowrie shells
Preceded by	Succeeded by
Adanse; Akani (Arcania)	Fante Confederacy; British Gold Coast
- Today part of: Ghana

Assin or Asen, was an Akan kingdom in what is now central Ghana. It rose during the sixteenth and seventeenth centuries as the heart of the inland Akani mercantile organization, controlling major caravan routes between the Gold Coast ports and the auriferous regions in the Pra and Ofin basins. It was known to Europeans as "Acanes Pequenos", "Acanes Petite", "Little Akani," before its conquest by Denkyira in 1698.

== History ==
=== Origins ===
Traditions trace the Assin to the Adanse–Amansie region, regarded in Akan cosmogony as the ancestral homeland of many Twi-speaking peoples. Adanse was considered the first of the five principal Akan states, Adanse, Akyem Abuakwa, Assin, Denkyira, and Asante, known collectively as the Akanman Piesie Num ("the first five Akan states"). Several ruling clans of Assin trace their origins in Adanse territory: the Asona of Apemanim, the Afutuakwa of Fosu, and the Aboabo of Assin Nyankomase all trace their homes to the stretch of land between the Pra River and the Kusa range, while the Atandasu division identifies Nimiaso and Apagya as their original sites.

=== Kingdoms of Arcania and the Accanists ===
By the sixteenth century, Assin (referred to in European sources as "Accanij," "Assingrud," or "Klein Acanij") had emerged as one of the principal inland Akan polities of the Pra–Ofin basin, alongside Adanse, Twifo, Akyem, and Manso Nkwanta. It was politically divided into two provinces: "Assas" and "Acanes pequenos." According to Ray Kea, these divisions were later known as "Cocoritee" and "Crijsakee," and by the early eighteenth century as Apemanim and Attandasu. Each division contained important towns that served as political and mercantile centers. Assin was also regarded as part of the wider Akani confederacy, whose southern members, including Twifo and Fetu, acted as carriers of gold from the northern mining zones to the coast.

=== Expansion and warfare ===
In 1618 Assin clashed with Abrem, in a conflict said to have cost tens of thousands of lives. Between 1657 and 1659, Assin fought a protracted war with Twifo, during which it captured large numbers of prisoners who were sold as slaves to European traders. These conflicts formed part of the wider disintegration of the Akani organization, as incessant wars between Twifo and Assin disrupted trade and forced merchants into military service.The kingdom also expanded into southern Etsi (later known as Kabes Terra) between 1639 and 1641, establishing mercantile "captaincies" in conquered towns.

In 1676 an Assin army, estimated at 20,000 men, invaded Afutu, and in the 1680s Assin remained a leading force in the interior. However, from the 1690s Denkyira's military expansion brought devastation to Assin. In 1698 Denkyira invaded, destroyed its ancient markets, and shattered the Akani commercial organization. In 1697 Boa Amponsem of Denkyira defeated King Agyensam of Koshea in Assin, reducing the kingdom to poverty and forcing it into debt with English traders.

=== Decline and subordination ===
After the fall of Assin's mercantile empire, its remnants aligned with the Fante Confederacy and became entangled in eighteenth-century wars with Denkyira and Asante. Following its defeat by Denkyira, Assin's ruler Agyensam sought refuge at the court of Osei Tutu in Kumasi, urging Asante to challenge Denkyira. His diplomacy contributed to the outbreak of the Asante–Denkyira war of 1699–1701. After Denkyira's fall, Assin became one of the first allies of the emerging Fante Confederacy. In 1706 the Fante intervened to save Assin from an alliance of Kabessterra, Fetu, and Asebu. Their cooperation deepened in 1715, when Assin fought a major war against Akyem, supported by Fante, Fetu, Agona, and Akwamu. By this time Assin had also conquered neighboring Etsi (Cabessterra), but its survival depended increasingly on Fante support and, later, on accommodation with Asante power.

The destruction of Assin's markets by Denkyira in 1698, followed by their conquest by Asante in 1710, marked the collapse of the Akani gold-trading system. As long-distance trade in southern Ghana shifted from gold to the export of enslaved people, Assin could not compete because its merchants lacked access to war captives. Unlike Denkyira or Asante, it was not an expansionist military power able to demand tribute in the form of slaves, and its defeat left its markets in foreign hands. From the early eighteenth century onward, Assin's economic role was eclipsed as militarized states organized commerce around slave-raiding and warfare.

== Society ==
=== Political organization ===
According to Ray Kea's interpretation of contemporary sources, Assin was governed by a council of chiefs (ahenfo) drawn from its two main divisions, Cocoritee and Crijsakee. This body supervised both political administration and the mercantile sector, appointing caravan leaders and coastal brokers. Each division contained administrative towns such as Dahoe and Acanes Pequenos, which functioned as provincial capitals, while smaller towns like Branna served as district centers.

=== Military ===
Assin armies were among the largest in the region. Contemporary reports claimed an army of 20,000 men in 1676, though this may have been exaggerated. Its forces relied heavily on mass mobilization and war captives, many of whom were incorporated into slave communities that also provided porters for caravans.

== Economy ==
=== Assin Manso ===
One of the most important inland markets of the eighteenth century was at Assin Manso, situated on the main road between Kumase and the slave ports of the central coast. Here captives brought from Asante and the northern hinterland were sold to coastal brokers, who then transported them to the forts at Anomabo, Cape Coast, and Elmina. The river at Assin Manso, known as *Donko Nsuo* ("Slave River"), became infamous as the place where enslaved Africans were forced to bathe before their final march to the Atlantic. Today, Assin Manso is preserved as a site of heritage tourism and commemoration of the transatlantic slave trade.

=== Trade and mercantile system ===
Although central to the flow of gold, Assin itself lacked major mines. Its prosperity depended on controlling caravan transport between the mining towns of Tafo and the coastal forts. From the sixteenth to seventeenth centuries Assin was the leading inland trading state of the Gold Coast, described by Europeans as "the Arcanyes" or Akani. Its economy was dominated by the state-administered Akani trading organization, which linked coastal ports such as Elmina, Cape Coast, and Little Komenda with the markets of Tafo, Begho, and the Tano basin.

European observers noted that the "Akani" or "Akanist" traders were a multiethnic profession of long-distance merchants based in the Assin area. They dominated the gold trade until the late seventeenth century, when militarized states such as Denkyira and Asante disrupted Assin's markets and redirected commerce toward the slave trade. The Assin council of ahenfo controlled trade routes, prices, and credit. It appointed the Akani merchant-brokers, or "captains," who managed coastal and inland trade posts. These captaincies were unique to Assin and ensured that no private mercantile class operated outside state control.

=== Caravans and labor ===
Akani caravans were large, numbering 20–100 merchants and 150–300 porters, most of them slaves. They transported iron bars, textiles, and gunpowder inland, returning with gold and agricultural produce. Slave villages under Assin's chiefs supplied porterage labor, while peasant farmers paid land rents in gold, creating a revenue base for the state's trading operations.

=== Markets ===
Assin hosted specialized periodic markets dating back to the fifteenth century. These markets, held several times a week, were visited by traders from neighboring polities and became the hub of inland redistribution for European imports. Major market towns included Banda and Attandasu, both of which lay on caravan routes linking Cape Coast to the Pra–Ofin basin.

== Legacy ==
Assin's role as "Little Akani" placed it at the center of Gold Coast trade before the rise of Denkyira and Asante. Its captaincies, markets, and caravans formed the prototype for later Akan mercantile institutions. Though conquered by Denkyira in 1698 and overshadowed by Asante in the eighteenth century, Assin remained politically significant through its ties with the Fante Confederacy and its involvement in Anglo–Asante conflicts. By the eighteenth century Assin's role shifted from commercial preeminence to that of a strategic buffer allied with the Fante against Asante expansion.

== Sources ==
- Kea, Ray A. (1982). Settlements, Trade, and Polities in the Seventeenth-Century Gold Coast. Baltimore and London: Johns Hopkins University Press. ISBN 978-0-8018-2310-7.
- Daaku, Kwame Yeboa (1970). Trade and Politics on the Gold Coast, 1600–1720. Oxford: Clarendon Press. ISBN 019821653X.
- Law, Robin (2012). "Fante Expansion Reconsidered: Seventeenth-Century Origins". Transactions of the Historical Society of Ghana. 14: 41–78.
- Law, Robin (2013). "The Government of Fante in the Seventeenth Century". The Journal of African History. 54 (1): 31–51.
- Buah, F. K. (1998). A History of Ghana. London: Macmillan.
- Boaten, Kwasi (1971). "The Asante Before 1700". Institute of African Studies Research Review. 8 (1): 50–65. Archived from the original on 27 May 2025.
- Shumway, Rebecca (2011). The Fante and the Transatlantic Slave Trade. Rochester Studies in African History and the Diaspora. Vol. 52 (illustrated, reprint ed.). University of Rochester Press. ISBN 9781580463911.
