= Fante Confederacy =

Pre-colonial Fante coastal polities and later confederation

Fante Confederacy Mfantseman (Fante)
- Pre-15th century–1873
- Status: Former confederacy
- Capital: Mankessim
- Common languages: Fante
- Religion: Akan religion (centered on the shrine of Nananom Mpow)
- Government: Autonomous City-States; Commonwealth (pre-colonial); Constitutional confederation (1868–1873)
- King-President (1868–1873)
  - 1868–1871: King Ghartey IV; House of Ghartey
- Legislature: Mfante Ahenfo Nhyiamu
- History
  - Migrations from Bono State and Akani (Arcania); establishment of Kwaman and Mankessim: Pre-15th century
  - Portuguese contact with coastal Fante and neighboring polities: 15th–16th centuries
  - Civil war within the Fante polities, rise of Abora as the dominant political and military center: 1690s
  - Defeat of the Fetu Kingdom: 1693–1694
  - Rise of Anomabo as the leading commercial port and expansion of Atlantic slave trading networks dominated by Fante merchants: late 17th–18th centuries
  - Militarization of Fanteland under Abora leadership: early 18th century
  - Invasions and occupation by the Asante Empire: 1806–1816
  - Restoration of coastal autonomy: 1831
  - Proclamation of the Fante Confederation: 1868
  - Incorporation into the British Gold Coast: 1873
- Currency: Cowries
Preceded by
Bono State
Akani (Arcania)
Fetu Kingdom
Succeeded by
Gold Coast (British Colony)
- Today part of: Ghana

The Fante Confederacy (also called a confederation, federation, and other similar terms) was an alliance of small kingdoms and autonomous city-states in present-day coastal Ghana, united by the Fante people. The confederacy emerged in the late 17th century as a regional force, and became a modern constitutional confederation established in 1868. It expanded through diplomacy, warfare, and trade alliances to incorporate multiple neighboring states in the Gold Coast. At its height, the Fante Confederacy controlled key coastal trade routes and ports such as Anomabo, which became the most important center on the coast.

During the 18th and 19th centuries, the Fante played an important role as middlemen in the Atlantic trade, controlling access between inland states and European merchants along the coast. Ports like Anomabo flourished under Fante control, becoming a key center for the export of enslaved people and goods. Their strategic position allowed them to mediate regional commerce, exert influence over inland trade routes, between European powers and inland states in the Gold Coast.

== History ==
=== Origin ===
According to oral traditions, the earliest Borbor Fante were Akan-speaking migrants who left the Brong region (likely Tekyiman) and settled at Kwaman before establishing Mankessim in the Central Region of Ghana. Mid-18th-century Borbor Fante oral traditions also refer to another homeland called "Arcania," associated with the Pra–Ofin basin. Their migration was led by three legendary figures, Oburumankuma (the whale), Odapagyan (the eagle), and Osun (the elephant). The embalmed remains of Oburumankuma and Odapagyan were carried with the group and later interred at the sacred grove of Nananom Mpow, which became a spiritual and political center of Fante identity. Mankessim became the nucleus of Borbor Fante settlement.

=== Early Dutch relations ===
In 1624, the Dutch States-General concluded their first treaty on the Gold Coast with Ambro, the Brafo of Fante, in which the Fante pledged support to the Dutch against the Portuguese. Dutch maps from 1629 depicted the polity as "Fantijn," situated between Asebu and Agona. By the early seventeenth century, European companies were drawn into local conflicts along the Fante coast. In 1634, the Dutch refrained from openly supporting Asebu against the Etsi and instead mediated the dispute, fearing that direct military assistance would provoke the Fante and drive them into alliance with the Portuguese. During the 1640s, Anglo-Dutch rivalry on the Gold Coast was concentrated in Fetu and Fanteland. In 1640, during intensified competition, Dutch forces seized Anomabo as part of direct attempts to disrupt English trade along the Fante coast. After the English secured a foothold at Kormantse, the Dutch stationed a ship offshore to disrupt their trade, and in the same year the English accused the Dutch of encouraging the people of Anomabo to seize their flag. In 1645, Dutch fears of an English advance at Accra led them to propose establishing a school there in an effort to win local support. After the English loss of Kormantse in 1663, they were compelled to pay nearly £32 to each Dutch ship landing at Fante to resume trade on the coast.

=== The rise of Fantyn as a regional power ===
During the seventeenth century, the Fante were the scene of regular conflicts, with the Brafo and the ruling council leading the member states to war against neighboring kingdoms while also contending with internal civil strife. According to Robin Law, in 1645 Acron (Gomoa) seceded from the Agona kingdom to the east. According to Kea, movement outward from Mankessim began in the 1660s or 1670s, when leaders of the town's original quarters established new settlements along the coast. As they expanded, they established satellite communities such as Abura, Ekumfi, and Nkusukum. The dispersal was followed by military victories against earlier coastal groups such as Asebu and the Etsi, who oral traditions claim had already been present when the Fante arrived from the interior. By the 1680s, Gomoa was reduced to a vassal state. Fante forces continued to fight a series of wars with Asebu to the west, gradually bringing the kingdom into their sphere of influence by the same decade.

=== Internal conflicts and widespread warfare ===
In the 1690s the Fante federation entered a civil war. The brafo of Abora accused the Brafo of Fante of violating the mfantseman constitution. As a result, the supreme Brafo lost legitimacy and recognition. The constituent city-states divided into opposing factions. In the fighting that followed, the brafo of Abora emerged victorious and assumed the position of Brafo of the Fante city-state federation. Between 1693 and 1694, Fante forces defeated the Fetu Kingdom, turning a long-standing rival into a subordinate ally. Although the Fante did not directly participate in the Komenda Wars as a unified state, British and Dutch intervention weakened Fetu and contributed to the political crisis within the federation. During the Dutch–Komenda conflict, Fante forces provided military assistance to Komenda, and in 1695 English reports noted that an army raised with Fante support had driven off Twifo and Kabesera soldiers hired by the Dutch. In 1696, the Dutch paid 80 marks to the Fante to secure their support against the Komenda people, but when repayment was later demanded the Fante refused. Fante alliances with Assin allowed the polities to extend influence over the Etsi kingdom in 1696. However, a subsequent Denkyira invasion of Assin, combined with the Brafo's refusal to intervene, triggered a further constitutional breakdown. In August 1697, the Fante shifted their allegiance from the Dutch to the English, after the Brafo of Fante was persuaded to support English operations by supplying gunpowder and other assistance during the Komenda conflict. By the early 1700s, the Brafo and the ruling council had reestablished a degree of internal order, but political authority had shifted decisively toward Abora. During this period, some coastal states temporarily attempted to achieve political unity in response to European pressure, a development that Daaku identifies as the nucleus of an early Fante confederacy.

=== Military expansion and alliances ===
By 1706, growing pressure from Asante expansion contributed to a shift among the Fante from political disunity toward coordinated action. In that year, when Kabesera, Fetu, and Asebu threatened Assin, Fante forces intervened in support of Assin, capturing the Ahen Poma of Fetu and killing the king of Asebu, thereby preventing Assin's defeat. Under Abora's leadership, warfare intensified, militias led Fante armies in repeated campaigns of conquest. The Fante launched a new series of military campaigns to re-establish their supremacy on the coast. Over nearly two decades of warfare, the confederacy permanently extended its control to Asebu and Agona, and may have conquered Fetu before losing it by mid-century. This period also marked the transition from a gold-based economy to one centered on the Atlantic slave trade. Captives from these wars were often sold to European slavers at Anomabo, Cape Coast, and other ports. Around 1710, the Fante sought to replace short-term wartime cooperation with more durable alliances, particularly with Assin, to secure their shared interests in the interior. In conflicts involving Assin and Twifo, the Fante emerged as the decisive external power, and European officials recognized that alienating the Fante risked broader disruption along the coast. In June 1715, chiefs of Fante, Assin, and Fetu met at Abora and agreed on a defensive alliance under Fante leadership, with Assin and Fetu committed to turn to the Fante in the event of attack. By 1715, Fante influence had extended eastward into Agona and toward Akwamu, and the council at Abora warned that any attack on Assin would be treated as hostile to the Fante, helping to deter Akyem intervention. Neighboring kingdoms that were not conquered increasingly aligned with the Fante, including Assin and Akwamu in the early eighteenth century, followed by Wassa, Twifo, Denkyira, Nzima, and Old Akyem by the 1730s, as the Ashanti threat intensified. During this period, the Fante had become the dominant power on the central Gold Coast, a position tacitly accepted by states such as Akwamu, which aligned with the Fante to prevent a rapprochement between the Fante and Akyem.

The conflicts led to the collapse of older royal houses across the coast. By 1730, the ruling systems of Asebu, Agona, Fetu, and others had been dismantled and replaced with a confederated structure grounded in oaths and ritual. A new generation of war leaders and spiritual authorities governed in place of monarchs. The wars were fought to secure trade routes and captives rather than territory. According to Shumway, European observers misunderstood Fante political dynamics, describing the Brafo as a king, even though his authority was limited and contingent on consensus from town councils. The 1740s brought political instability. The priest-oracle of Nananom Mpow ordered five Brafos executed for corruption within three years, leaving the office vacant and weakening its influence. In the power vacuum, the Asahin (war leader) of Abura, a militarily dominant province, assumed greater leadership. In the 1750s, when the Compagnie du Senegal attempted to establish a presence in Anomabo, the Nananom Mpow priesthood rejected them, further asserting coastal autonomy.

=== The rise of Anomabo and coastal hegemony ===
By the 1750s, Anomabo had eclipsed both Cape Coast and Elmina as the principal port for the Atlantic slave trade on the Gold Coast. Its rise was fueled by its embrace of the offshore "boat trade," which allowed local merchants to bypass European trading forts and transact directly with captains of private slave ships. These traders, often referred to as "interlopers," offered better terms than company factors, enabling Anomabo's caboceers to command high prices while collecting heavy customs duties. Anomabo's political elite leaders like Eno Baisie Kurentsi and Amonu Kuma, became assertive overtime. They frequently used palavers (formalized disputes and negotiations) to resist British attempts to impose restrictions on trade. In several documented instances, Anomabo elites blockaded forts, expelled company agents, or withheld provisions and port access until their demands were met. By the 1760s, English records recorded that trade at Anomabo overwhelmingly occurred outside the fort. One agent reported 17 English slave ships anchored there while Cape Coast had "few slaves purchased." Despite high customs duties, Anomabo remained the preferred destination due to its competitive prices and relative freedom from European control. The dominance in trade translated into regional political influence. Amonu Kuma I, who led Anomabo during the 1770s, emerged as one of the key figures of the Coastal Coalition. He managed relations not only with the British and Dutch but also with inland polities, positioning Anomabo as the main diplomatic and commercial gateway to the Atlantic world.

=== Ashanti invasion and the fall of the coastal coalition ===
By the late 18th century, tensions between the Ashanti Empire and the Fante Confederacy had escalated significantly. Although the British publicly supported the Fante, their commitment rarely extended beyond limited logistical support. Internal memos from 1772 acknowledged the strategic value of the Fante alliance, yet emphasized that real intervention would only follow threats to British forts.

In 1806, Ashanti forces launched a full-scale invasion of Fanteland in an effort to gain direct control of coastal trade. The British, as in previous decades, confined their role to supplying arms and provisions, hoping to avoid a direct confrontation. The Fante were decisively defeated. Further Ashanti campaigns in 1809, 1810, 1811, and 1814–16 solidified their coastal presence, replacing Fante war leaders with chiefs loyal to Kumasi. Despite the defeats, Fante resistance persisted. British policy toward the Ashanti was inconsistent was inconsistent; they sometimes tolerated thoer control and other times encouraged Fante resistance. The ambiguity led to the outbreak of the First Anglo-Ashanti War, during which Governor Sir Charles MacCarthy was killed at the Battle of Nsamankow in 1824. At the 1826 Battle of Dodowa, a combined Fante and British force defeated the Ashanti army. The 1831 treaty restored Fante independence, recognizing their sovereignty and prohibiting further Ashanti invasions into the coastal region.

=== The modern Confederacy ===
After the collapse of the Coastal Coalition and the devastation caused by Ashanti invasions in the early 19th century, a new generation of coastal elites began rebuilding political authority. By the 1840s, a class of educated Fante merchants had emerged, forming relationships with British officials. In 1844, several Fante states entered a protocolonial arrangement through the Bond of 1844, allowing British jurisdiction over certain criminal matters while retaining local autonomy. Tensions escalated in the 1850s as British-imposed taxes and growing European competition undermined local commerce. Discussions in the British Parliament even suggested abandoning direct administration. A destabilizing event came in 1867 with the Anglo-Dutch Treaty, which exchanged forts along the coast. The Dutch took over forts in Fante territory, including Elmina, without local consultation. Many Fante elites interpreted this as a Dutch-Ashanti alliance, threatening their autonomy.

=== Formation of the Confederation ===
In response, a January 1868 meeting at Mankessim brought together Fante paramount chiefs and representatives from Twifo and Asen. They declared the formation of the Fante Confederation, an independent state opposing both Dutch encroachment and British paternalism. King Ghartey IV of Winneba was elected the first King-President, while King Nana Amfo Otu Gyandoh I of Abura was appointed commander of the confederation's military forces.The confederation was backed by powerful Fante merchant families who had gained influence through their role in Atlantic commerce and education. When the Dutch attacked Komenda in February 1868, the Confederation mobilized 15,000 troops, successfully blocking their attempt to occupy the fort. The Fante then laid siege to Elmina, but the campaign stalled. Commerce across Fanteland collapsed, and with little revenue from trade, the confederation faced financial crisis. A revised constitution in November 1871 established an Executive Council dominated by educated Fante merchants. King Amfo Otu and Kwesi Edu of Mankessim served as co-presidents until Otu became sole head in 1872.

=== Collapse and British annexation ===
Internal rivalries between Mankessim and Abura, along with the continued costs of warfare, strained the fragile union. The Ghartey family funded government operations temporarily, but financial exhaustion set in. In 1870, the Dutch sold their holdings to the British, removing the Confederation's primary external enemy. The British offered incentives to Fante leaders and arrested dissenters, eroding unity. Without support from either Britain or the merchant elite, the confederation collapsed by 1873 and Fanteland was fully incorporated into the British Gold Coast colony.

== Divisions ==
According to Ray Kea, between the 14th and 16th centuries, some Fante settlements were built on leveled hilltops and were likely fortified. Villages were located in surrounding forested valleys and supplied these towns with food and basic goods. Towns were laid out with organized plans that included defined streets and public or market squares.

=== Mankessim ===
Early Mankessim was divided into five autonomous quarters, each occupying a distinct section of the town and led by its own abrafo (general). Population pressure led the leaders of the quarters to establish new settlements along the coast like Kwamankese, Abura, Ekumfi, Anomabo, Anyan, Nkusukum, and Essiam. In the second half of the 17th century, the leading figures of Mankessim, also called "Great Fanteen," included the abrafo of the town's quarters, each quarter having its own internal administration. Other officials included the chief revenue collector (groote marijnje), the captain of the caboceers (magistrates and office holders), the captain of the mancebos (the town militia), and the curranteers, who served as representatives in the state assembly at Mankessim. The town also had an captaincies from Akani (Arcania), which represented brokers, traders, apprentices, servants, and enslaved people, as well as priests and priestesses attached to the shrine of Nananom Mpow. In Kea's analysis, the population at the end of the 17th was estimated to range between 20,000 and 30,000 permanent inhabitants. Including its dependent hinterland, the population of the greater area was around 80,000. Under Abora's leadership, the brafo lost its military meaning and was reduced to an osofo priest of the shrine of Nananom Mpow.

=== Nkusukum ===
In the mid-17th century, Anomane, the brafo of the Nkusukum quarter, had authority over the coastal town of Anashan. The curranteer of Nkusukum, who represented the quarter in the Mankessim state assembly, resided in Anashan and represented that town as well. Another official under Anomane's authority was Adoni, the son of a deceased brafo of Fante. Adoni served as captain of the Mankessim militia (mancebos), a post to which he was likely elected by the militia itself. The militia, known as the Bendifoes, numbered about 2,000 musketeers. Adoni was a wealthy noble. His estate included the coastal village of Aniang and more than 110 personal dependents, including men, women, and children.

=== Great Kormantse ===
According to Kea, Great Kormantse's ruler, Ambo (c. 1632–1646) controlled between ten and fifteen villages. In 1664, Kormantse was able to mobilize about 300 militia members and its rural communities could mobilize between 500 and 800 men. The total population of Kormantse and its hinterland in the 1660s was probably between 5,000 and 8,000 people. In 1682 the settlement was described in European sources as "ye great town." At Great Kormantse, which was occupied by the English until 1664, the fort housed soldiers, boatmen, and artisans, along with enslaved workers, interpreters, gold takers, and brokers. Many of these individuals were known as company servants and received regular wages. They lived close to the fort or in designated quarters of the town. The fort also employed Akan officials, including a captain and his assistants, who worked alongside town authorities and representatives of Mankessim. After Abora's rise, Great Kormantse declined in importance and was replaced by Anomabo and Cape Coast as the principal sea-towns.

=== Abora ===
From the late 17th century and throughout the 18th century, Abora was the dominant Fante city-state both politically and militarily. In the early 1680s the ruler of Abora began strengthening the town's military by recruiting "vagabonds" and "runaways," including escaped slaves, as soldiers. By 1700 Abora maintained three militias: the Bendifoe, the Tafo, and the Ankobia. The military expansion continued during the first half of the 18th century. By the mid-18th century Abora controlled five militia companies. Each company was led by a captain or colonel and each contained more than 2,000 men. Under Abora's leadership Anomabo functioned as the main merchant center of the Fante federation while Cape Coast, Mouri, Tantumkweri, Egya, Apam, Little Komenda, and Winneba, maintained militias, controlled village hinterlands, and hosted European trading establishments.

=== Anomabo ===
In the second half of the eighteenth century, Anomabo became the leading port on the Gold Coast and the wealthiest Fante town. According to Kea. its population likely exceeded 20,000 permanent residents. When Anomabo's commercial power grew, new political offices were created, new villages were founded, and the territory under the town's jurisdiction expanded. A large militia force was also developed. Office-holders, brokers, and traders established settlements in surrounding areas for farming, and these settlements were linked to the town through militia companies. In the 1750s the English trading company constructed a fort at Anomabo. By this time, Anomabo traders were also active in sea-towns along the Ivory Coast and the Slave Coast.

== Government ==
The Fante political system was non-monarchical. Authority at Mankessim was held by a council of elders and ritual specialists rather than a king. According to oral traditions, the first holder of the office accepted ritual mutilation as a sign of loyalty, which established the precedent for the office. From an early period, leadership among the Fante was elective rather than hereditary. The Brafo led military campaigns and handled relations with outside powers but his authority was limited and depended on approval from the Mfanise Ahenfo Nhyiamu, a council made up of the heads of Mankessim's quarters. Each member of this council also represented one of the Fante provinces. Political authority operated as a commonwealth rather than a centralized state. Some allied or subordinate polities retained their own kings, but there was no overall Fante paramount ruler. Chiefs and rulers from allied states, were called "caboceers" in European sources, they met at Mankessim at regular intervals, especially during the Ahoba Kuma festival, where joint decisions were made. The shrine of Nananom Mpow played an important role in governance by enforcing oaths, delivering oracles, and advising the council.

=== The Fante Confederacy ===
During the modern Fante Confederation of 1868–1873, governance followed a different model. A written constitution issued in 1871 created the position of King-President. The office carried mainly judicial and ceremonial authority, while an elected council made most executive decisions. The government established a federal court in Mankessim, introduced a regional poll tax, supported education, and carried out limited public works before financial problems and British intervention brought the confederation to an end.

== Society ==
=== Nobility and elite organization ===
In Fanteland, the people who carried out most long-distance trade with Europeans were usually nobles. According to Kea, the nobles were known as abirempon, afahene, or ahen, and they functioned as captains or officers of towns and villages. Noble status was a recognized legal category across the coast and the interior. Nobles belonged to a region-wide association described in contemporary sources as a "brotherhood" or "confraternity of nobles,". The confraternity existed alongside the vertical mmusuatow lineage system and was a defining feature of Fante city-state society. Priests and priestesses were organized separately and did not belong to the confraternity. Noble status (abirempon) carried specific rights that applied wherever a noble traveled. It included the right to trade freely, to own and sell enslaved people, to take part in town council meetings, to display symbols of authority such as drums, horns, and regalia, to receive a share of court fines, and to claim protection from enslavement for themselves and their children. Noble status could be acquired in three ways: by birth or ancestry, by merit through service or achievement for the polity, or by wealth through the purchase of an office or title in a public ceremony. Nobles belonged to a region-wide association known in European sources as the “brotherhood” or “confraternity” of nobles. This confraternity linked towns and villages across Fanteland and functioned as a horizontal organization that cut across lineage divisions. It operated alongside the vertical mmusuatow system of descent groups. Priests and priestesses formed their own separate organizations and did not belong to the confraternity. Nobles were free to move between towns. Anomane and Adoni could leave Mankessim, settle in another Fante town such as Kwamankese, and be appointed to political or military offices there, or travel beyond Fanteland. Their status as abirempon and membership in the confraternity of nobles ensured recognition and acceptance wherever they settled. The system of noble privilege began to weaken in the early eighteenth century and had largely disappeared by the 1720s, following the military expansion of larger states such as Akwamu, Fante, and Asante.

=== Poor relief and social welfare ===
Fante towns maintained systems of support for poor residents, known as anihumanifo or adofo. After the main harvest, farming households in surrounding rural areas paid part of their taxes in gold. Town revenue collectors (marini) distributed a portion of this gold to poor residents living in the towns. Court fines were another source of support. In 1645, for example, the obirempon of Great Kormantse was fined three ounces of gold by the town council, and one ounce of this fine was set aside for the poor of the town. Priests and priestesses also contributed to poor relief by redistributing part of the offerings they received from wealthy petitioners, including gold dust, ornaments, livestock, farm produce, and trade goods. European trading officials often followed these local practices. Dutch factors distributed goods seized from smugglers to poor residents in towns where they operated, while Danish officials at Fort Fredericksborg in Amanfro distributed gold fines collected from company employees to the poor of the town.

=== Sanctuary towns and priestly authority ===
Priestly towns and villages consisted of priests, priestesses, their apprentices, servants, and enslaved people. The communities were self-governing and were under the authority of a senior priest. Debtors fleeing creditors, enslaved people and pawns escaping their owners, and people accused of crimes could seek protection by entering the compound of a priest or priestess or by reaching a village or town ruled by a priestly authority. In principle, no outside authority was permitted to violate the sanctuary status of priestly property.

=== Religion ===
The most important religious institution was the shrine of Nananom Mpow at Mankessim. Originally an ancestral shrine of the Borbor Fante, it evolved into an oracular center during the eighteenth century. From the 1730s to the 1760s, Mankessim increased in importance as the center of the worship of Nananom Mpow. During this period, the title brafo of Mankessim lost its military function. The holder of the title became the chief officiating priest (osofo) of Nananom Mpow. The brafo was no longer a war leader and was identified with the priesthood of the shrine. By the second half of the eighteenth century, Nananom Mpow had become the main oracle consulted across Fanteland. People consulted the shrine on matters related to warfare, political disputes, trade, illness, and personal affairs. A large body of priests officiated at the shrine. They conducted healing, ritual practices, and divination. The shrine also functioned as an information center. Priests and abrafo maintained networks that gathered information about the lives and activities of those who consulted the oracle. This information was used during divination and public consultation. Worshippers came not only from Mankessim and its hinterland but from other Fante towns and Fante-controlled settlements.

== Military ==
Urban militias were organizations made up mainly of commoners and played a central role in town life. Any male stranger who settled in a town, whether free or enslaved, was normally required to join a militia, although there were some exceptions. Militia membership was one of the ways a person acquired citizenship in the town. At Anomabo in 1681, two town quarters were organized into a single militia known as the Bendifoes, numbering between 400 and 500 musketeers. By 1700, as the town's population increased and more strangers were recruited, the militia had grown to about 2,000 men. During the seventeenth century, fishermen, salt producers, craftsmen, and priests were generally excluded from militia service. Their citizenship status was instead tied to other town institutions. Rural communities were attached to particular town militias. When an obirempon founded slave villages using newly purchased enslaved people, those villages were placed under his militia. In the early part of the century, villages in wartime followed the banners of individual political leaders. In the second half of the century, town councils reassigned villages to town militias, and villages thereafter fought under the banners of militia officers rather than individual elders. Under the older system, male villagers followed the banners of town elders as subjects. Under the asafo militia system, they belonged to the town militia, and their citizenship rights were established through that membership.

=== Military under Abora ===
Under Abora's leadership, warfare intensified. Abora militias led Fante armies in repeated campaigns of conquest. By 1700 the Fante could mobilize between 25,000 and 50,000 men. The wars led to the destruction or decline of rival city-state systems and marked a transition toward greater militarization across Fanteland than in the sixteenth and early seventeenth centuries.

== Economy ==
The Fante city-states were major exporters of gold in the earlier period and later became major exporters of enslaved people. Atlantic trade brought lasting changes to how the economy worked and how wealth was organized. Economic power operated through two connected systems. One was based on political authority and the control of surplus through tribute, levies, and similar obligations. The other was based on trade and money lending, managed through merchant and broker networks that linked coastal towns with inland markets. Production supported this system and included farming, food supply, craft production, luxury goods, and trade concentrated in large towns, while smaller dependent settlements near these towns supplied food and other basic goods.

=== Craft centers ===
Towns contained distinct craft quarters, and specialized craft villages were located on the outskirts of urban centers. Some settlements specialized in metalworking, boat building, salt production, or bead making. Others functioned as livestock and poultry markets, produce markets, or slave markets.

=== Trade activity ===
According to Kea, the Fante economy was part of a wider regional system on the Gold Coast that linked coastal and inland markets. Trade was organized through market exchange, credit, and debt rather than plantation production. Merchants supplied goods on credit to producers and traders, who were often indebted to them for long periods. Debts were recorded in recognized currency and could be passed on or settled over time. Throughout the seventeenth century, Fante rulers resisted exclusive trading arrangements, maintaining that control of trade access was inseparable from control of the state and refusing to confine commerce to a single European company. Anomabo had established strong commercial links with Asante, Akyem, Akwamu, Twifo, and other interior regions. A report from 1717 described Anomabo traders as aggressively directing the supply of enslaved people toward their port. They placed agents in inland markets to intercept traders and redirect caravans away from rival sea-towns such as Komenda and Cape Coast.

=== Long distance trade ===
The Fante established long-distance maritime trade links with the Kingdom of Kongo around the Congo-Angola region. This was accomplished with dugout canoes powered by sails of woven palm fronds.

== See also ==
- Fante people
- Eguafo
- Kingdom of Fetu
- Kingdom of Assin
- List of rulers of the Fante Confederation
- Accra Native Confederation

== Sources ==
- Boahen, Adu (1974). "Politics in Ghana, 1800–1874". In J. F. A. Ajayi; Michael Crowder (eds.). History of West Africa. Vol. 2. London: Longman. pp. 167–261.
- Boahen, A. Adu (2005). "Akan and Asante: Farmers, Traders, and the Emergence of Akan States". In Shillington, Kevin (ed.). Encyclopedia of African History. New York: Fitzroy Dearborn. pp. 31–33.
- Buah, F. K. (1998). A History of Ghana (2nd ed.). Oxford: MacMillan.
- Daaku, Kwame Yeboa (1970). Trade and Politics on the Gold Coast, 1600–1720: A Study of the African Reaction to European Trade. Oxford: Clarendon Press. ISBN 019821653X.
- Fynn, J. K. (1987). "The political system of the Fante of Ghana during the pre-colonial period". Unwersitas. 9.
- Gocking, Roger (2005). The History of Ghana. Westport, Connecticut: Greenwood Press. pp. 30–31. ISBN 0-313-31894-8.
- Kea, Ray A. (2000). "A Comparative Study of Thirty City-State Cultures: An Investigation". In Mogens Herman Hansen (ed.). City-State Culture on the Gold Coast: The Fante City-State Federation in the Seventeenth and Eighteenth Centuries. Historisk-filosofiske Skrifter. Vol. 21. Copenhagen: The Royal Danish Academy of Sciences and Letters. pp. 519–530. ISBN 9788778761774. OCLC 46990631.
- Laumann, Dennis Heinz (1993). "Compradores-in-Arms: The Fante Confederation Project (1868–1872)". Ufahamu: A Journal of African Studies. 21 (1–2): 120–136. doi:10.5070/F7211-2016747.
- Law, Robin (2012). "Fante Expansion Reconsidered: Seventeenth-Century Origins". Transactions of the Historical Society of Ghana. 14: 41–78.
- Law, Robin (2013). "The Government of Fante in the Seventeenth Century". The Journal of African History. 54 (1): 31–51.
- Reynolds, Edward (2005). "Ghana (Republic of): 1800-1874". In Shillington, Kevin (ed.). Encyclopedia of African History (in 3 volumes). Vol. 1. Routledge. pp. 565–566. ISBN 978-1-135-45670-2.
- Shumway, Rebecca (2011). The Fante and the Transatlantic Slave Trade. Rochester Studies in African History and the Diaspora. Vol. 52. University of Rochester Press. ISBN 9781580463911.
