= Akan clans =

Akan clans are organized matrilineal lineages that define descent, inheritance, and social identity within Akan culture. Clan membership is inherited through the mother’s line, and every Akan belongs to a recognized clan. The Asante, Fante, and others use a totemic clan system in which each clan is associated with a symbolic animal. By contrast, the clans around the Bono are based around local residential wards or quarters called abrono.

== Abusua system ==
The clan system is traditionally composed of eight major matriclans: Aduana, Agona, Asakyiri, Aseneɛ, Asona, Bretuo, Ɛkoɔna, and Ɔyokoɔ. Members of each clan regard themselves as blood relatives regardless of geographical separation or personal familiarity.

=== History ===
According to oral traditions collected by K. Y. Daaku, most of the ruling clans of the Akan forest states trace their origins to Adanse. The Asona clan of Akyem Abuakwa, Edweso, and Offinso locate their ancestral homeland at Kokobiante, while the Asona of the Asen states, including the Asenee of Attandasu, the Asona of Apemanim, the Afutuakwa of Fosu, and the Aboabo of Assin Nyankomase, place their origins in the forest zone between the Pra River and the Kwisa range. The Bretuo founders of Mampong and the Kwahu area trace their beginnings to Ayaase and Ahensan, while the Oyoko identify Abadwem and Edubiase as their earliest settlements. The Asakyire of Akrokeri and Odumase trace their origins to regions north of Adanse, the Asenee of Dompoase associate their beginnings with the vicinity of their present town, and the Ekona of Fomena maintain an origin tradition rooted in Adanse. The Agona clan of Denkyira formerly occupied territory extending from Asokwa westward toward the Obuasi area by the confluence of the Oda and Ofin rivers.

=== Taboos ===
Marriage and sexual relations within the same clan are forbidden and regarded as incestuous because of shared maternal ancestry. According to Kofi Agyekum the abusua is conceived as a corporate and enduring social unit encompassing the living, the dead, and future generations. Clan identity extends beyond death through ancestral affiliation and remains central to inheritance practices, funerary obligations, and social belonging within Akan communities.

== Abrono system ==
In 1929 Rattray recorded that the Bono of Takyiman were “apparently wholly ignorant of these Ashanti and Fante clan names,” and that instead of identifying by clans they referred to streets or quarters (Abronno) within their towns. Rattray theorized the Bono originally had an older social system based on residence and occupation rather than the abusua clan structure developed later among southern Akan groups and spread through Asante influence. Oral traditions compiled by J. Boachie-Ansah in 1978 and 1986 confirmed Rattray's observations that the clan system in Wenchi followed a different organizational model from those of Adanse, the Asante, and other southern Akan areas. Rather than being named after totems, clans in Wenchi and Techiman derived their names from residential quarters, which were themselves named after trees under which the ancestors were said to have first settled.

== See also ==
- Akan people
- Abusua

== Sources ==
- Abaka, Edmund; Owusu-Ansah, David (2024) [1985]. Historical Dictionary of Ghana (5th ed.). Rowman & Littlefield Publishers. ISBN 978-0-8108-7500-5.
- Agyekum, Kofi (2024). "Akan concepts and proverbs on abusua, 'family'". Legon Journal of the Humanities. 35 (1): 132–163. JSTOR 48816102.
- Boachie-Ansah, James (2015). "Report on an Excavation Conducted in January, 2013 at Bonoso, Ghana" (PDF). Nyame Akuma (84): 41–54.
- Konadu, Kwasi; Campbell, Clifford C. (2016). The Ghana Reader: History, Culture, Politics. Duke University Press. ISBN 978-0-8223-5984-5.
- Rattray, Robert Sutherland (1929). Ashanti Law and Constitution. Vol. 1. Oxford: Clarendon Press.
