= Toase (disambiguation) =

Toase is a town in the Ashanti Region of Ghana.

Toase is also a surname. Notable people with this surname include:

- Don Toase (1929–1992), English footballer
- Suzie Toase (born 1979), British actress
