= Assin Praso Mass Grave =

Historic mass-burial site in Ghana

- Interactive map of Assin Praso Mass Grave
- Location: Assin Praso, Assin North Municipal District, Central Region, Ghana
- Coordinates: 5.2890°N 1.2490°W
- Built by: British colonial forces and African auxiliaries

The Assin Praso Mass Grave is a historic burial ground located within the Assin Praso Heritage Village in the Central Region of Ghana. The site is believed to contain the remains of British colonial soldiers, African auxiliaries, and enslaved Africans who died during the late 19th century Anglo-Ashanti Wars and the subsequent colonial occupation of the Gold Coast. The graveyard forms part of a wider heritage complex that commemorates the military, colonial, and slave-trade history of the Assin Praso area.

== Historical background ==
Assin Praso occupies a location along the banks of the Pra River, a waterway that served as both a commercial and military route during the colonial era. In the late 19th century, particularly around the 1896 Anglo-Ashanti campaign, the area became a British military camp and logistical base for operations into the Ashanti interior. According to local oral accounts and early colonial documentation, numerous soldiers, both British and African perished at the camp from disease, combat injuries, and the difficult tropical conditions. The dead were interred in a series of graves, some marked by headstones and others forming larger, unmarked burial pits that are now identified as mass graves.

The cemetery also contains the graves of individuals such as Major Victor Ferguson of the 2nd Life Guards Regiment and his wife, Sophia, who were stationed in the area during the height of British military presence. The proximity of the cemetery to the slave-trade route linking the Pra River to the coast suggests that the mass-burial areas may also include enslaved Africans who died during forced marches or while held in temporary encampments.

== Site description ==
The Assin Praso Mass Grave lies within a fenced section of the broader heritage village complex. A centuries-old mango tree, popularly called the “Tree of Life and Death” stands at the centre of the site and is believed to be more than 340 years old, surviving from the period of active trade and warfare in the region.

== Legacy and commemoration ==
The Ghana Tourism Authority and the Ministry of Tourism, Arts and Culture have incorporated the site into the official itinerary for the annual Emancipation Day celebrations, which commemorate the abolition of the trans-Atlantic slave trade and honour the resilience of African ancestors.

During these ceremonies, representatives from the African diaspora, local chiefs, and government officials gather at Assin Praso to perform traditional libations, prayers, and wreath-laying rituals in memory of those who perished. The rituals are often accompanied by cultural performances, historical re-enactments, and educational lectures.

In 2019, during the Year of Return initiative, African Americans and Caribbeans visited the mass-grave site as part of heritage tours retracing the route from the northern slave markets to the coastal forts.

== See also ==
- Assin Manso Slave River Site
- Anglo-Ashanti Wars
