= Obirifo Ahunako Ahor Ankobea II =

Paramount Chief of Gomoa Akyempim since 2001

- Omanhene (Paramount Chief)

Paramount Chief of the Gomoa Assin Traditional Area
- Reign: 2001–present
- Predecessor: Okukutah Ahunaku Acquah I
- House: Royal Asona Family

Obirifo Ahunako Ahor Ankobea II (also written Obrifo Ahunako Ahor Ankobea II or Obirifo Ahunako Ahor Ankobeah II) is a Ghanaian traditional ruler who has served as the Omanhene (Paramount Chief) and President of the Gomoa Assin Traditional Council in the Central Region of Ghana since 2001. He presides over a traditional area spanning over 165 towns and villages in the Gomoa West District and surrounding areas.

== Background and enstoolment ==
Obirifo Ahunako Ahor Ankobea II is a member of the Royal Asona Family, the ruling royal family of the Gomoa Akyempim Traditional Paramountcy. The paramountcy is organised around six ruling gates. Garuba Gate, Dokua Gate, Adadzewa, Wordzibeyor, Mbrowa, and Osuan Gate, each represented by a Head of Family (Ebusuapanyin), with the succession to the paramount stool following a rotational system among these gates.

He was enstooled as Omanhene in 2001 by the Kingmakers of all six Royal Gates of the Royal Asona Family, following the death of the previous paramount chief, Okukutah Ahunaku Acquah I.

== Gomoa Assin Traditional Area ==
The traditional area over which Obirifo Ahunako Ahor Ankobea II presides encompasses communities within the Gomoa West District of Ghana's Central Region. The people of the area are predominantly Fante, a subgroup of the Akan people, whose ancestors migrated to the region centuries ago.

In April 2024, the traditional council over which he presides was officially renamed from the Akyempim Traditional Council to the Gomoa Assin Traditional Council, in a ceremony held at Buduatta in the Central Region. The council is noted as one of the largest in the province, with over 100 member chiefs.

== Governance and public positions ==
As Omanhene, Obirifo Ahunako Ahor Ankobea II has used his platform to address governance issues within the traditional area. Notably, he has publicly advocated for the security screening of chieftaincy candidates, urging all kingmakers in the council to refer prospective chiefs to the Bureau of National Investigations (BNI) for vetting before installation, citing concerns about the infiltration of land guards and bad actors into the chieftaincy institution.

In May 2025, he appointed Nana Kumasah Krampah II, the Omankrado of Gomoa Asempanyi and Nyimfa Division, as Amankra-Kumahene (Deputy Chief Protocol) of the Gomoa Assin Traditional Council, with a mandate focused on strengthening cultural traditions and community development across the council's 165 towns and villages.

He has consistently defended the integrity of the traditional chieftaincy system, emphasising that chieftaincy succession is governed by customary law and that the installation of a chief must be carried out by the appropriate elders and kingmakers in accordance with Ghanaian customary law and the Chieftaincy Act, 2008 (Act 759).

== Chieftaincy disputes ==
In April 2021, a faction of divisional chiefs and elders petitioned for his destoolment, alleging misconduct including denial of burial rites to a sub-chief who died of COVID-19 in early 2021, and broader claims of mismanagement. Supporters of the Omanhene, including the divisional chiefs of the area and the lawful Heads of Families, rejected these destoolment moves as procedurally invalid, arguing that any such proceeding must be commenced at the Judicial Committee of the Central Regional House of Chiefs under Section 40 of Act 759.

In November 2025, he publicly condemned an attempt by a group of individuals to unlawfully install a rival claimant as chief of Gomoa Assin, affirming that neither the Traditional Council nor its Registrar had any record of a destoolment or authorised new installation.
