= Akrokerri College of Education =

- Adansi University
- Established: 1962
- Affiliations: Kwame Nkrumah University of Science and Technology
- Principal: Dr. Emmanuel Nyamekye
- Location: Akrokerri, Adansi North District, A22020, Ghana; 6.30061°N 1.64885°W
- Language: English and Twi
- Region Zone: Ashanti; Ashanti
- Short name: Adansi University
- Source: An Atlas of The Forty Colleges of Education in Ghana.

Akrokerri College of Education is a teacher education college in Akrokerri (Adansi West District, Ashanti Region, Ghana). The college is located in Ashanti / Brong Ahafo zone. It is one of the about 46 public colleges of education in Ghana. The college participated in the DFID-funded T-TEL programme. It was accredited to tertiary institution in 2007 and was affiliated to Kwame Nkrumah University of Science and Technology (KNUST) in 2019.

== History ==
The Akrokerri College of Education was established in 1962 to cater for some of the surplus number of candidates who could not find places in the then existing two-year teacher training colleges. The Teachers’ Certificate ‘A’ four-year programme began in the same year. The college was established with seventy students, half of whom were to be admitted into a training college that was to be established at Kpando Municipal District.

The first batch of female students to be admitted was a group of thirty Post ‘B’ in September, 1963. The college now has an enrolment of one thousand one hundred and thirty-one students. The college started as Teachers’ Certificate ‘A’ four-year institution, however, in 1964 a two-year English specialist course was started at the college. In 1966, the course was transferred to Winneba. In 1969, the two-year post secondary teacher training programme was added to the Certificate ‘A’ four-year course. In 1973, Mathematics and Science specialist programme was introduced. It lasted for only three years. In 1975, the two-year post secondary programme was changed to three-year post secondary programme. The college run the Modular programme for untrained teachers in the eighties. It was one of the few colleges that run Access Course for entry into training colleges in recent times. In 2004, it started a programme in Diploma in Basic Education (D.B.E). It was accredited to tertiary institution in September, 2007. The D.B.E. programme is also offered by untrained teachers and Certificate ‘A’ teachers on sandwich basis for four and two years respectively.

Akrokerri Training College, popularly called 'Adansi' University’ has contributed greatly to the development of human resource in the country with a large campus and serene environment for effective academic work. Akrokerri College of Education is a force to reckon with in athletics and sports.

The college has had five principals since its establishment in 1962.
Name	Years served
Mr. E. S. P. Akoto	1962 – 1976
Mr. E. Osei-Wusu	1976 – 1983
Mr. C. A. Aikins	1983 – 1991
Mr. M. K. Nsowah	1991 – 2000
Mr. J. K. Asare	2000-

== Location ==
The Akrokerri College of Education is located in the Adansi North District, Ghana and it located in the Ahsanti/Brong Ahafo Zone of the colleges of education in Ghana.

== Education ==
There are three programmes offered at the Akrokerri college of Education.

Programmes

A. General Programmes

B. Early Childhood Education Studies

C. Mathematics/Science Education
