= Adanse =

Pre-colonial kingdom in modern Ghana

Coordinates: 6.4833333°N 0.1833333°E

Adanse State Adanseman
- 9th century–1659 1659–1701 (Vassal to the Denkyira); 1701–1873 (as part of the Asante Empire); 1873–1935 (part of the Gold Coast Colony); 1935–1957 (as part of the Asante Kingdom); 1957–present (as part of Ghana)
- Status: Former kingdom
- Capital: Adansemanso (first capital); Akrokerri (former capital); Dompoase (former capital); Ayaase (former capital); Fomena (permanent capital)
- Common languages: Twi (Adanse dialect)
- Religion: Akan religion
- Government: Monarchy; transitioned to clan-based city=-state confederation; later elective chieftaincy
- Adansehene
- History
  - Initial permanent settlement at Adansemanso: c. 393–800 CE
  - Adansemanso populous during this period: 9th century
  - Peak occupation of Adansemanso: 13th to 15th century
  - Formation of Adanse as a centralized Akan state settlement: Pre-16th to 17th century
  - Decline of Adansemanso: 16th to 17th century
  - Became a tributary of Denkyira: 1659
  - Battle of Feyiase, declared for and joined the Asante Kingdom after the Asante victory over Denkyira: 1701
  - British occupation following the Third Anglo-Ashanti War; later restored as part of the Asante Kingdom within the Gold Coast Colony: 1873; 1935
- Currency: Gold dust (sika futuro); barter
Succeeded by
Akani (Arcania)
Old Akyem
Kingdom of Assin
Kwahu
Denkyira
Asante Empire
- Today part of: Ashanti Region; Ghana

Adanse or Adansi was one of the earliest Akan states in the southern part of present-day Ashanti Region, Ghana. It is regarded as the ancestral homeland from which many of the southern Akan trace their origins. Adanse became an early centre of gold production, regional trade, and clan-based governance, and is remembered as senior among principal Akan states. It influenced the formation of later polities including Denkyira, Akyem, Assin, and the Asante Empire.

== Etymology ==
The name Adanse derives from the Akan word adanseɛ, meaning “builders”. Traditions and historians explain that Adanse earned this name because they were the first Akan people to construct permanent homes and shrines, remembered as “those who build houses”.

== History ==
=== Origins ===
Adanse is described as a spiritual and cultural origin of Akan civilization, associated with the place where the art of building began and as the first organized Akan state, from which other polities learned the art of government from. Its first capital, Adansemanso was an ancestral settlement and one of the oldest Akan towns in the forest interior. According to oral and archaeological evidence, the site was settled by 393 CE, and continuously developed from the 9th century CE onward. In traditions it was known as the first among the “five original great towns of the Akan”.

=== Adansemanso and early urbanism ===
In the 9th century Adansemanso was very populous, and by the 13th century, it was a large and complex settlement. It was described by archaeologists as “probably the largest ancient town in the central forest area of Ghana”, with its ruins being one square kilometer . More excavations revealed evidence of collapsed houses in rows over 100 meters long with multiple superimposed clay floors, which indicate long-term rebuilding. Research revealed its peak was between the 13th and 15th centuries. Kea situates Adansemanso within a wider regional city-state culture that took shape from the 9th to the 15th centuries that was anchored in craft production and long-distance trade.

=== The kingdoms of Arcania and the Accanists ===
Early 16th-century sources such as Duarte Pacheco Pereira refer to interior gold traders identified as Haccanys (Akani), Cacres (Akrokerri), Andese, and Souzos, linked to the forested gold zones later associated with Adanse. Europeans called these traders “Accanists” and the region “Accany” or “Arcania”, praised for pure gold known on the coast as “Akan sica”. In 1517 envoys from a “King of the Akani” visited Elmina regarding conflict with neighbors, and by 1548 officials recorded “civil wars among the Akani”. A 1629 Dutch map labelled “Acanni” and called its people principal merchants. Later Dutch accounts use forms like “Accanien” and identify “Alance”, read as Adanse, within a “Kingdom of Arcania”. Several scholars place “Accany” in the Pra-Ofin basin. Although absent from early European accounts, Daaku identifies Adanse as one of the principal states of the Akani confederacy.

=== Decline of Adansemanso and growing political fragmentation of Adanse ===
Prior to archaeological investigations, historians such as F. K. Buah and K. Y. Daaku placed the centralization and decline of Adanse under Awurade Basa at Adansemanso in the 16th or 17th century. Findings later revealed that Adansemanso slowly declined until it was abandoned in the late 16th to early 17th century before the height of Atlantic trade. Ray Kea links the decline to the migration of wealthy abirempon families who established new centers of power elsewhere. A variant of Adanse traditions collected by Ivor Wilks claim that after the death of Awurade Basa, centralized authority fragmented into smaller autonomous states like Ayaase, Dompoase, Edubiase, Fomena, and Ahinsan.

=== Adanse city-states and conflicts with Denkyira ===
Denkyira traditions describe the Adanse states of the Ofin–Pra basin as the dominant power in the first half of the 17th century. Abankeseso was founded by refugees fleeing Akrokerri's control and later became Denkyira's capital. From the 1630s onward, the influx of firearms through European trade “sharpened competition” among the Akani states, including Adanse, and hastened the disintegration of the wider Akani confederacy. Adanse was traditionally said to rely on “the wisdom of its great God Bona and not on force,” which left it ill-equipped for this new militarised era. Akyem Abuakwa oral accounts reccount commercial rivalries and succession disputes weakened Adanse internally, while mounting pressure from Denkyira deepened the crisis. In the 1640s, Denkyira incursions combined with the rise of the early Asante power destabilised the region and spurred migrations of Asona and other Adanse groups eastward.

=== Defeat and subjugation to Denkyira ===
In 1659 a Dutch report described wars in the “distant districts of Adansee” that nearly annihilated the state, noting that “Adanse had quietly disappeared”. Oral traditions credit the decisive victory to Denkyira under Wirempe Ampem, though some accounts attribute it to Boa Amponsem I. The defeat marked a major reversal, as Denkyira had earlier been subject to Adanse. Adanse persisted as a polity, overshadowed by Denkyira until the rise of Asante in the late 17th century.

=== Integration into the Asante state ===
After Asante defeated Denkyira at Feyiase in 1701, Adansi declared for Asante and became part of the state. Adanse lay within metropolitan Asante and hosted nkwansrafo highway police at the Kwisa post under central authority. In 1839 Thomas Birch Freeman was detained at Kwisa until permission arrived from Kumase, with the Adansehene coordinating with officers there. After the Katamanso war in 1826, Adansi opened peace contacts with the British due to safer passage to the coast. In 1831 the Asantehene rewarded negotiators, including the Fomenahene Kwante and Gyamera Kwabena, with regalia to constitute their own akyeame. In February 1872 Fritz Ramseyer recorded a Kumase council in which the Adansehene supported release of captives or, failing that, war against the British.

=== Colonial encounters and the Treaty of Fomena ===
In 1873 the Adansi chief Kobina Obeng sought independence from Asante, encouraged by proximity to British protection north of the Pra. British forces invaded Kumasi in 1873, deposed Kofi Karikari, and compelled negotiations. Mensa Bonsu restored control over most dependencies, with the exception of Kwahu. The Treaty of Fomena in February 1874 imposed a 50,000-ounce gold indemnity on Asante and renounced claims over several southern territories. Although Adansi had seceded, it fought with Kumasi in the 1900 War of the Golden Stool due to the stool's religious significance. In 1933 the Adansehene of whom him and his people were described as "true Ashanti" wrote a letter to the British government swearing an "oath that he was certainly prepared to call and serve Nana Prempeh as Asantehene; indeed, he felt sorry that ignorant people should refer to such a great man as 'Kumasihene and not as Asantehene." and in the 31st of January 1935 they re-joined the re-established Asante Kingdom.

== Divisions ==
Adanse occupied the central forest belt and was located north of the Pra–Ofin river confluence. According to Ray Kea's analysis, Adanse contained thirty-two towns, with seven of them were paramount. Major towns included Fomena, Akrokerri, Dompoase, and Edubiase, with ancestral sites being Ayaase, Abadwam, and Kokobiante. They were confederation of autonomous city-states but were subordinate to the Adansehene. An Akan proverb was used to describe the loose structure: “Adanse nkotokwa, obiara ne ben o am,” meaning “the towns were like little crabs, each ruling its own hole.”

=== Adansemanso ===
Adansemanso was the first capital of the Adanse state and is associated with Awurade Basa of the Asenee clan. It was remembered in Akan cosmology as the center of the universe. Archaeologists have described it as a large and complex town that engaged in iron and gold production, with possible but inconclusive evidence for glass production.

=== Akrokerri ===
Akrokyere (Twi:Akrokerrɛ) is believed to be one of the oldest, if not the oldest settlement in Adanse. It was ruled by the Asakyiri clan where traditions credit rulers like Asare Nyansa with town-building and the establishment of councils (Abagua). Awurade Basa of Adansemanso according to tradition, was the son of Asare Mintim, the ninth King of Akrokyere. According to James Anquandah, Akrokerri specialized in iron production, making weapons and agricultural tools.

=== Ayaase ===
Ayaase was a town ruled by Bretuo clan. Bretuo royals migrated from Ayaase and Ahensan to establish Kwahu and the pre-Asante state of Mampong.

=== Bodwesango ===
Bodwesango (Bogyesango) was an ironworking town founded by the Agona clan. According to Asantehene Prempeh II, the Agona and Toa lived in Bogyesango and Ahuren, before establishing Kingdoms of Denkyira, Akyem Kotoku, and Akyem Bosome.

=== Dompoase ===
Dompoase is identified in oral traditions as one of the Adanse paramount city-states. It was associated with ironworking and was ruled by the Asenee clan, whose lineage played a role in the political organization of the Adanse area. It was one of the capitals of Adanse prior to Fomena.

=== Edubiase ===
Edubiase was another significant Adanse settlement tied in tradition to ironworking and migrations of ruling lineages. James Anquandah referred to it as the “Birmingham of old Adanse”. Edubiase along with Abadwam were the early homes of the Oyoko clan. According to Kofi Darkwah, the founders of the Asante Empire, took old Adanse practices to new environments when they migrated.

=== Fomena ===
Fomena became the permanent capital after Bonsra Afriyie of the Ekona clan secured custody of the sword and kept by not marrying outside of his clan in Fomena.

=== Kokobiante ===
Kokobiante was the place of origin for the Asona clan who founded Akyem Abuakwa as well as the pre-Asante states of Edweso, and Offinso. Oral traditions recall, Akyem founders carrying sacred institutions into the east.

== Government ==
The sacred sword Afenakwa was used to unite the Adanse and served as the central symbol of political authority. The sword was first associated with Awurade Basa of Adansemanso, then passed to successors in Bretuo and Asenee lineages at Ayaase and Dompoase. According to local traditions, whoever held the sword lead Adanse in times of war but in peacetime the leader was not given special privileges. The Adansehene ruled with the advice of divisional chiefs and elders, while defined offices carried specific responsibilities: the Akokyerehene served as chief soul washer (Akradwarefohene), the Ayaasehene as chief executioner, the Akrofuomhene as treasurer, the Edubiasehene as spokesman, and the Dompoasehene as Gyaasehene or steward.

== Society ==
=== Social organization ===
According to Ray Kea, in the fifteenth and sixteenth centuries, mmusuatow (abusua companies) emerged in Adanse as corporate bodies that managed obligations of credit, labor, and rituals among elites. Kea interprets them as instruments for incorporating dependents into urban households and for coordinating extraction and redistribution throughout the state. Adanse and states maintained administrative hierarchies in which major towns that controlled smaller subordinate ones.

=== Religion ===
Adanse authority was based on shared ritual practices to its principle oracle rather than on military power. Thei tutelary deity Bona, was worshipped at Patakoro and served as the main spiritual focus of the state. The Bona priesthood and the Bonahene led annual ceremonies, including a yam festival in late August or early September and a year-end dance. At the events, sacred water (Bonasuo) from the Bona cave was used to purify the stools of chiefs and the community. Each town also kept a Bonsamboɔ stone for sacrifices and other rituals to the Bona cult. The shrine at Patakoro strengthen political legitimacy, with leaders turning to its oracles during disputes or crises. Alongside the Afenakwa sword, the Bona cult provided a second source of cohesion, one sacred and one political.

=== Architecture ===
Local traditions identify Adanse as the first Akan group to develop durable architecture in mud and clay, which later Akan states adopted. Archaeology at Adansemanso showed planned rectangular compounds and long-term occupation. Palace compounds contained sacred items like the Afenakwa sword, royal stools, and forms of regalia.

== Economy ==
=== Gold production ===
From the 12th century onward, gold extracted in the forest belt sustained regional exchange. In Adanse, mining was conducted under royal authority: the Adansehene retained rights over all discovered nuggets and received one-third of gold from stool lands, while the Sanaahene managed state revenue and the royal treasury.

By the 16th century the Pra–Ofin basin, including Adanse, was among the most productive gold zones in West Africa, supplying over half of the gold exported through both coastal ports and inland savanna markets. During its time as the capital, Adansemanso was as a center of kola trade. Adanse's traders were advantageous due to access to Mande markets at Begho in the north and to European forts on the coast. The state was an intersection of trans-Saharan and Atlantic routes. By the late 16th and 17th centuries, rising European demand for gold and ivory expanded the consumption of imported goods in the forest belt. Gold trade caused population growth, causing many migrations, competition and sharpened rivalries among Adanse and its neighbors.

=== Trade ===
Adanse occupied a central position in long-distance commerce. Akan producers exchanged gold with Wangara merchants at towns such as Begho, linking the forest zone to Sahelian and trans-Saharan markets. Traded goods included salt, cloth, copper alloys, and enslaved persons. Caravan routes connected Adanse to coastal ports and interior markets by two main arteries: the Twifo road and the Arcania road. On the Arcania route, tolls were collected at border posts such as “Atchersee” on the Assin–Adanse frontier before caravans moved further north. Brokers based in Adanse, Kaase, Kwabre, Tafo, and Akyem extended their operations as far as Bighu and Bono Manso. By the mid-17th century, Akwamu merchants were also active, conducting regular trade in Adanse and Manso. Inland wars, like the struggles between Adanse and Denkyira in the later 17th century, disrupted the gold trade to the coast. Between 1668 and 1676 the Dutch received only 3,150 marks of gold.

== Legacy ==
Adanse is remembered for its role in gold production and as a civilizational origin for several Akan states. Today, Adanse is a traditional area in the Ashanti Region, bounded to the south by the Pra River, to the east by Banka and Asante Akyem, and to the west by Denkyira.

== See also ==
- Akan people
- Akan Clans
- Akani (Arcania)
- Akyem Kingdoms
- Assin
- Denkyira
- Asante Empire
- Asante Traditional Buildings

== Sources ==
- Barbot, Jean (1732). A Description of the Coasts of North and South-Guinea, and of Ethiopia Inferior, Vulgarily Angola... With Appendix.
- Ramseyer, Friedrich August; Kühne, Johannes; Weitbrecht, Mary; Gundert, Hermann; Christlieb, Theodor (1875). Four Years in Ashantee. J. Nisbet & Co. p. 321.
- Tordoff, William (1962). "The Ashanti Confederacy". The Journal of African History. 3 (3): 399–417. doi:10.1017/S0021853700003327. S2CID 159479224.
- Daaku, Kwame Yeboa (1970). Trade and Politics on the Gold Coast, 1600–1720: A Study of the African Reaction to European Trade. Oxford: Clarendon Press. ISBN 019821653X.
- Boaten, Kwasi (1971). "The Asante Before 1700". Institute of African Studies Research Review. 8 (1): 50–65. Archived from the original on 27 May 2025.
- Daaku, Kwame Y. (1971). "History in the Oral Traditions of the Akan". Journal of the Folklore Institute. 8 (2/3): 114–126. doi:10.2307/3814101. JSTOR 3814101.
- Boahen, A. Adu (1973). "Arcany or Accany or Arcania and the Accanists". Transactions of the Historical Society of Ghana. 14: 105–110. JSTOR 41405842.
- Daaku, K. Y. (1973). "A History of Sefwi: A Survey of Oral Evidence". Research Review. NS. 9 (3): 32–36. Archived from the original on 29 May 2025.
- Wilks, Ivor (1975). Asante in the Nineteenth Century: The Structure and Evolution of a Political Order. Cambridge University Press. ISBN 0-521-20463-1.
- Arhin, Kwame (1979). A Profile of Brong Kyempim: Essays on the Archaeology, History, Language, and Politics of the Brong Peoples of Ghana. Accra: Institute of African Studies, University of Ghana.
- Kea, Ray A. (1982). Settlements, Trade, and Polities in the Seventeenth Century Gold Coast. Baltimore and London: Johns Hopkins University Press. ISBN 978-0-8018-2310-7.
- Wilks, Ivor (1993). Forests of Gold: Essays on the Akan and the Kingdom of Asante. Athens, Ohio: Ohio University Press.
- Kwadwo, Osei (1994). An Outline of Asante History. O. Kwadwo Enterprise. ISBN 978-9964-91-509-4.
- Vivian, Brian C. (December 1996). "Recent Excavations of Adansemanso" (PDF). Nyame Akuma (46): 37–39.
- Addo-Fening, R. (1997). "The 'Akim' or 'Achim' in 17th and 18th Century Historical Contexts: Who Were They?". Asiatic Research Bulletin. 7 (1): 1–20. Archived from the original on 4 September 2025.
- Buah, F. K. (1998). A History of Ghana. London: Macmillan. ISBN 978-0-333-65934-2.
- Darkwah, Kofi (1999). "Antecedents of Asante Culture". Transactions of the Historical Society of Ghana (3): 57–79. JSTOR 41406650.
- Kea, Ray A. (2000). "A Comparative Study of Thirty City-State Cultures: An Investigation". In Mogens Herman Hansen (ed.). City-State Culture on the Gold Coast: The Fante City-State Federation in the Seventeenth and Eighteenth Centuries. Historisk-filosofiske Skrifter. Vol. 21. Copenhagen: The Royal Danish Academy of Sciences and Letters. pp. 519–530. ISBN 9788778761774. OCLC 46990631.
- McCaskie, T. C. (2003) [1995]. State and Society in Pre-colonial Asante. Cambridge University Press. ISBN 9780521894326.
- Wilks, Ivor (2004). "The Forest and the Twis". Transactions of the Historical Society of Ghana. New Series, No. 8 (8): 1–81. JSTOR 41406709.
- Shinnie, Peter (2005). "Early Asante and European Contacts". Journal des Africanistes. 75 (2): 25–42. doi:10.4000/africanistes.113.
- McCaskie, T. C. (2007). "Denkyira in the Making of Asante c. 1660–1720". The Journal of African History. 48 (1): 1–25. doi:10.1017/S0021853706002507. JSTOR 4501014.
- Konadu, Kwasi (2010). The Akan Diaspora in the Americas. Oxford: Oxford University Press. doi:10.1093/acprof:oso/9780195390643.001.0001. ISBN 9780195390643.
- Ofosu-Mensah, Ababio Emmanuel (2010). "Traditional Gold Mining in the Akan States of Ghana: A Case Study of the Adanse and Amansie Areas". Nordic Journal of African Studies. 19 (2): 124–147.
- Anquandah, James (2013). "The People of Ghana: Their Origins and Cultures". Transactions of the Historical Society of Ghana (15): 1–25. JSTOR 43855009.
- Konadu, Kwasi; Campbell, Clifford C. (2016). The Ghana Reader: History, Culture, Politics. Duke University Press. ISBN 9780822359845.
- Konadu, Kwasi, ed. (2022). Africa's Gold Coast Through Portuguese Sources, 1469–1680. Oxford University Press for the British Academy. ISBN 9780197267066.
