= Dompoase Senior High School =

Mixed second cycle school in Dompoase, Ghana

Coordinates: 6°18′31″N 1°31′48″W

- Dompoase, Ashanti Region; Ghana

Information
- Type: secondary/high school
- Established: 1974 (52 years ago)
- Grades: Forms [1-3]
- Nickname: DOSS

Dompoase Senior High School (also known as DOSS) is a mixed second cycle institution in Dompoase in the Adansi North District in the Ashanti Region of Ghana. Anglogold Ashanti provided books to the school, Akrofuom SHS, Asare Bediako SHS and others.

== History ==
The school was established in 1974.

== Former headteachers ==
- In 2014, Opoku Asamoah.
- In 2016, Doris Bimpong.
- Haruna Oppong was the headmaster of the school.
