= Assin People =

Ethnic group in Ghana

Assin
Asen Asin

Total population
- 135,000 (1995)

Regions with significant populations
- Central Region, Ghana: 135,000 (1995)

Languages
- Akan

Religion
- Akan religion, Christianity, Islam

Related ethnic groups
- Other Akan people (e.g. Fante, Denkyira, Akyem)

The Assin (also known as Asin and Asen) are a subgroup of the Akan people who live mainly in Ghana’s Central Region. They are historically linked to the wider Akan cultural and political world, with roots in the forest–savanna transition zone. Today, they occupy territory around Assin Foso, which serves as the capital of the modern Assin area.

== History ==
The Assin trace their origins to early Akan migrations across the Pra River. By the sixteenth and seventeenth centuries, they had become central players in the Gold Coast trade, acting as middlemen between the inland gold-producing regions and the coastal forts. Their political organization developed into the Kingdom of Assin, which played a major role in regional wars and commerce before coming under Denkyira and later Asante influence.

== Divisions ==
The Assin are divided into two main groups: the Assin Apemanim (or Apimenem), based to the east of the Cape Coast–Kumasi Highway with their historic center at Assin Manso, and the Assin Attendansu (or Atandanso), who live to the west of the highway with their capital at Nyankumasi. Both divisions share common Akan institutions such as chieftaincy, matrilineal inheritance, and stool-based governance, but maintain distinct local leadership.

== See also ==
- Kingdom of Assin
- Great Akan
- Asante Empire
- Adanse
- Kingdom of Twifo
- Akwamu Empire
- Upper Denkyira District
- Twifo/Heman/Lower Denkyira District

== Sources ==
- Buah, F. K. (1980). A History of Ghana (Illustrated, revised ed.). Macmillan. ISBN 9780333659342.
- Olson, James Stuart (1996). The Peoples of Africa: An Ethnohistorical Dictionary. Greenwood Publishing Group. ISBN 978-0-313-27918-8.
