= Akwamu people =

Nation and ethnic group in Ghana

Akwamu
Akwamufoɔ

Regions with significant populations
- Eastern and Volta Region (Ghana)

Languages
- (Akan); French; English

Religion
- Akan religion; Christianity

Related ethnic groups
- Akan (Agona, Akuapem, Akyem, Asante people, Bono, Coromantee, Fante, Kwahu, Wassa, Sefwi)

- People: Akwamufoɔ
- Language: Akwamu Twi
- Country: Akwamuman

The Akwamu people, or the Akwamufoɔ, are an Akan ethnic group in Ghana. They are native around the border between the Eastern and Volta Regions. The Akwamu founded an empire from the 17th and 18th centuries until British colonization in 1886. Olsen states in his 1996 research that Akwamu populace in Ghana numbered over 50,000.

== See also ==
- Akwamu Empire
- Kingdom of Twifo
- Aduana
