= Asakyiri =

Clan of Akan people

The Asakyiri is one of the major eight major Akan clans. These clans are derived along the matrilineal lines.

== Totem ==
The totem of the Asakyiri people is the vulture.

== Origin ==
It is claimed that the Asona and Asakyiri clans are brothers and sisters who used to be referred to as Asona ne Asakyiri in Twi meaning Asona and Asakyiri.

== Major towns ==
The major towns of the Asakyiri people are mainly in the Adansi regions in the Ashanti Region and this includes Akrokerri etc.
