= Accra Native Confederation =

The Accra Native Confederation in 1869 was aimed at bringing the city of Accra under the British rule, for Ghana to be a self-governing nation under European control.

== History ==
The Accra Native confederation was influenced by the simultaneous, but considerably most successful projects of the Fanti Confederation in Gold Coast. The theories of James B. Africanus Horton called it the "Republic of Accra" project. From the first meetings of the operators of the Fanti Confederation in the city of Mankessim. In 1868 due to the joint colonization by British and Dutch government with interest in gold and diamonds, representatives of the leading Fante and also representatives of Denkyira, Wassa, Twifu, and Assin of Accra were present and proclaimed loyalty to the British with the right to the right of self-govern and keep the Dutch from assuming control henceforth in the area.

The new state had a King-President as its head and a council of Kings and Elders and National Assembly representing the larger portion of the society; similar to the Native American socio-political structure before European colonization of the land currently known as the United States of America, The Accra Native Confederation was formed in 1869, but quickly failed due to lack of support by the local native Chiefs to the land. As the European colonizers moved into the region an army of 15,000 men were utilized to impose poll taxes for the British who were now forcibly covering the region.

The backlash of fighting for control between the British and the Dutch continued on through 1873, leaving the peaceful and diplomatic Natives with little autonomy and right to govern their own land and people. The people were inflicted with illnesses like smallpox and dysentery which had never inflicted the health of their people until European invasion for the purpose of slave trading and colonization took place. The Accra were no longer able to account for the needs of their people or their land due to the power structure of the Europeans that entered their land, and their way of life for the purpose of slave trading, colonization, acquisition of gold and diamonds.
