= Apafram Festival =

Festival in Ghana by the Akwamus in Eastern region

Apafram Festival is an annual festival celebrated by the chiefs and people of Akwamu in the Eastern Region of Ghana. It is celebrated in the month of January.

== Celebrations ==
During the festival, there is a durbar of chiefs. The leaders of the community ride in palanquins. There is also drumming and dancing.

== Significance ==
The festival is celebrated to forge bondage with the ancestors of the people and ask them for protection.
