= Galamsey =

Illegal gold mining in Ghana

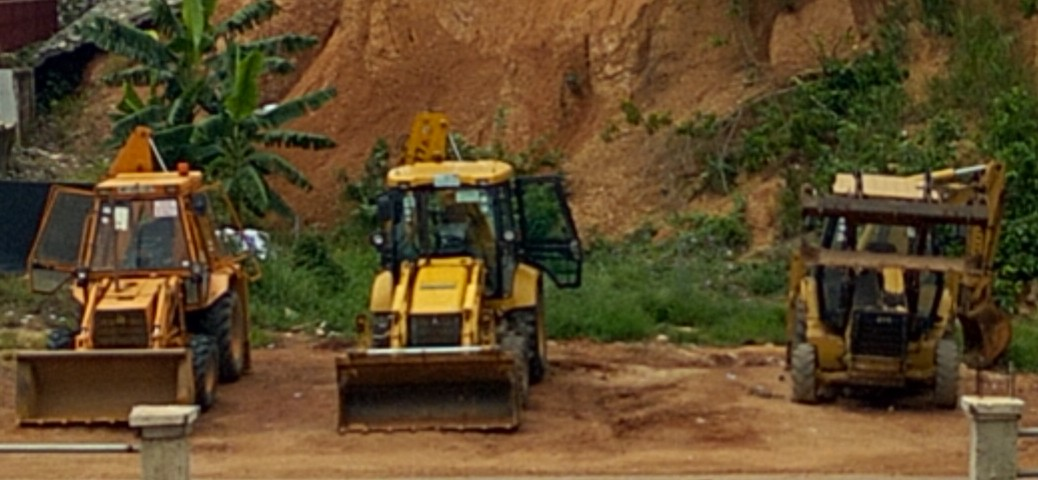
Galamsey in Ghana

Galamsey is illegal small-scale gold mining in Ghana. The term is derived from the English phrase "gather them and sell". Historically, galamsey referred to traditional small-scale mining practices in Ghana, where local communities would gather and search for gold in rivers and streams. However, over time, the term has taken on a broader meaning, encompassing both legal and artisanal small-scale mining (ASM). In Ghana, those involved in these activities are called galamseyers, and in neighbouring Francophone countries such as Ivory Coast and Burkina Faso, they are often referred to as orpailleurs. Ghana's widespread illegal mining activities have caused extensive destruction to the gold-rich West African country's forests.

== Background ==
Galamseyers dig small working pits, tunnels, and sluices by hand. Generally, they can dig only to a limited depth, far shallower and smaller than commercial gold mining companies. Under current Ghanaian law, it is illegal for galamseyers to dig on land granted to mining companies as concessions or licences. Most galamseyers either find gold in free metallic dust form or process oxide or sulfide gold ore using liquid mercury.

The number of galamseyers in Ghana is unknown but believed to range between 20,000 and 50,000, including thousands from China. The minister of information, Mustapha Abdul-Hamid, claimed in May 2017 that there are now 200,000 people engaged in galamsey, and according to other sources, there are nearly 3 million who rely on it for their livelihoods. They mostly operate in the southern part of Ghana, where there are substantial reserves of gold deposits, usually within the environs of the larger mining companies. Galamsey settlements are usually poorer than neighbouring agricultural villages. They have high rates of accidents and are exposed to mercury poisoning from their crude processing methods. Many women are among the workers, acting mostly as porters for the miners. In some cases, galamseyers are the first to discover and work extensive gold deposits before mining companies find out and take over.

== Types of galamsey ==
Broad galamsey categories	Galamsey types	Key resource/material use	Water relation	Comments
1. Alluvial	1. Washing plant	Washing plant/trommel, excavator, mercury, diesel, petrol, and lubricants	Operates near water bodies and requires a high volume of clean water for operation	Simultaneous mining and gold extraction
1. Alluvial	2. Washing board	Washing/sluice board, excavator, mercury, diesel, petrol, and lubricants	Operates near water bodies and requires a high volume of clean water for operation	Simultaneous mining and gold extraction
1. Alluvial	3. Pit dredging	Pits, suction dredge, mercury, diesel, petrol, and lubricants	Operates within mini-pit lakes or mine-out pits and requires water	Simultaneous mining and gold extraction
1. Alluvial	4. Stream/river dredging	River/stream, suction dredge, mercury, diesel, petrol, and lubricants	Within water bodies with adequate current	Simultaneous mining and gold extraction
1. Alluvial	5. Dig and wash	Pan, shovels, pickaxes, manual, sluice board, mercury	In wetland areas, rivers/creeks/streams banks	
1. Alluvial	6. Panning (poole poole)	Pan, shovels, pickaxes, manual, sluice board, mercury	In wetland areas, rivers/creeks/streams banks	
2. Underground mining	7. Abandoned underground shafts/tunnels	Shaft, blasting, dewatering, load, and haul of ore	Underground/landlocked areas	Mining only
2. Underground mining	8. Sample hole/pit, or "ghetto"	Manually dug-out pit, blasting, dewatering, mining	Underground/landlocked areas	Mining only
3. Millhouse	9. Mill-house operation	Diesel engine (Changfa), crusher, smoothing machine, retort, mercury, hydrocarbons	Landlocked areas; near the roadside, within urban centers, or near mining sites	Processing only
4. Surface operation	10. Surface	Diesel engine, mercury, retort, petrol, and lubricants	Landlocked areas; either near or far from water bodies, but requires water for operation	Simultaneous mining and gold extraction
5. Selection ("pilfering mining")	11. Selection (normally from large-scale or licit ASM sites)	Manual selection, diesel engine, millhouse, mortar and pestle/sluice board	Landlocked areas; either near or far from water bodies, but requires water for operation	Mining only

== Motives ==
The main motive behind people engaging in galamsey are youth unemployment and lack of job security. Young university graduates rarely find work, and when they do, it hardly sustains them. The result is that these youth go the extra mile to earn a living for themselves and their families.

The causes of illegal gold mining include bureaucratic licensing regimes, weak legal frameworks, political and traditional leadership failures, and corrupt officials. Socioeconomic factors and the proliferation of foreign miners and mining equipment further compound the issue.

== Dangers ==
On 13 November 2009, a collapse occurred in an illegal, privately owned mine in Dompoase, located in the Ashanti Region. The incident claimed the lives of at least 18 workers, including 13 women, who served as porters for the miners. Officials described the disaster as the worst mine collapse in Ghana at the time. In April 2013, a collapse occurred in the Central Region, killing at least 17 miners. However, the 2022 Bogoso explosion, linked to the transportation of mining explosives, became the most devastating mining-related disaster in the nation's history, resulting in at least 13 deaths and over 180 injuries.

On 23 February 2025, journalist Akwasi Agyei Annim was attacked while documenting illegal mining in the Breman-Adomanya forest in Wassa Amenfi West. Despite police awareness, Chinese and Ghanaian miners have encroached on 261 acres, causing environmental destruction and polluting the Tano River.

== Environmental impact ==
Illegal mining damages the land as well as water supply. Galamsey activities have depleted Ghana's forest cover and caused water pollution, due to the crude and unregulated nature of the mining process. In March 2017, the Minister for Lands and Natural Resources, John Peter Amewu, gave galamseyers a three-week ultimatum to stop their activities or be prepared to face the law.

== Human impact ==
Illegal mining has short-and long-term detrimental impacts on human health. Exposure to poisonous chemicals can lead to various cancers, mercury poisoning, silica-induced pneumoconiosis, and other respiratory conditions. In addition, stagnant water in abandoned mining pits serves as a breeding ground for mosquitoes, which can be vectors for various diseases.

== Stop Galamsey Now protest ==
On 21 September 2024, a local organization called Democracy Hub launched a protest aimed at pressuring the government of Ghana into enforcing measures to stop galamsey. The action lasted three days, with protesters demanding a direct and decisive intervention from President Nana Akufo-Addo, in the form of a presidential order to stop all illegal mining activities, particularly in forest reserves and along key rivers, such as the Pra, Ankobra, and Birim, which have all been polluted with harmful chemicals like mercury and cyanide. As of September 2024, 60% of Ghana's water bodies had suffered pollution due to galamsey. The illegal practice has also led to forest degradation, encouraged by the passage of Legislative Instrument L.I 2462 in 2022, which permitted mining in forest reserves.

The protests led to a total of 53 arrests, including a 62-year-old woman and a 10-year-old girl.

== Reactions ==
In September 2024, China's ambassador to Ghana, Tong Defa, condemned illegal mining in the country and warned Chinese citizens that the embassy will not assist those caught breaking the law. He stressed that China and Ghana both have the authority to enforce their laws on each other's citizens if they engage in illegal activities.

== Government response ==
In January 2026, Ghana's Minister for Lands and Natural Resources, Emmanuel Armah Kofi Buah, announced that 1,033 excavators and other pieces of heavy mining equipment would be monitored through a national tracking and permitting system. The ministry also introduced a new medium-scale mining license category intended to regulate mining activities and promote compliance with existing laws. The National Anti-Illegal Mining Operations Secretariat taskforce carried out raids in Edwinase in the Bekwai municipality and Wromanso in the Amansie Central District in February 2026. This led to the seizure of industrial equipment as well as weapons and ammunition.

== See also ==
- Operation Vanguard – military police joint task force against illegal mining in Ghana
- Crime in Ghana
- Zama zama – illegal artisanal miners in South Africa
