= Dompoase mine collapse =

On 12 November 2009, an unlicensed gold mine in Dompoase collapsed, killing at least 18 people, including 14 women and the mine owner. Up to 30 miners were working at the site when the landslide occurred. Officials described the disaster as the worst mining collapse in Ghanaian history.

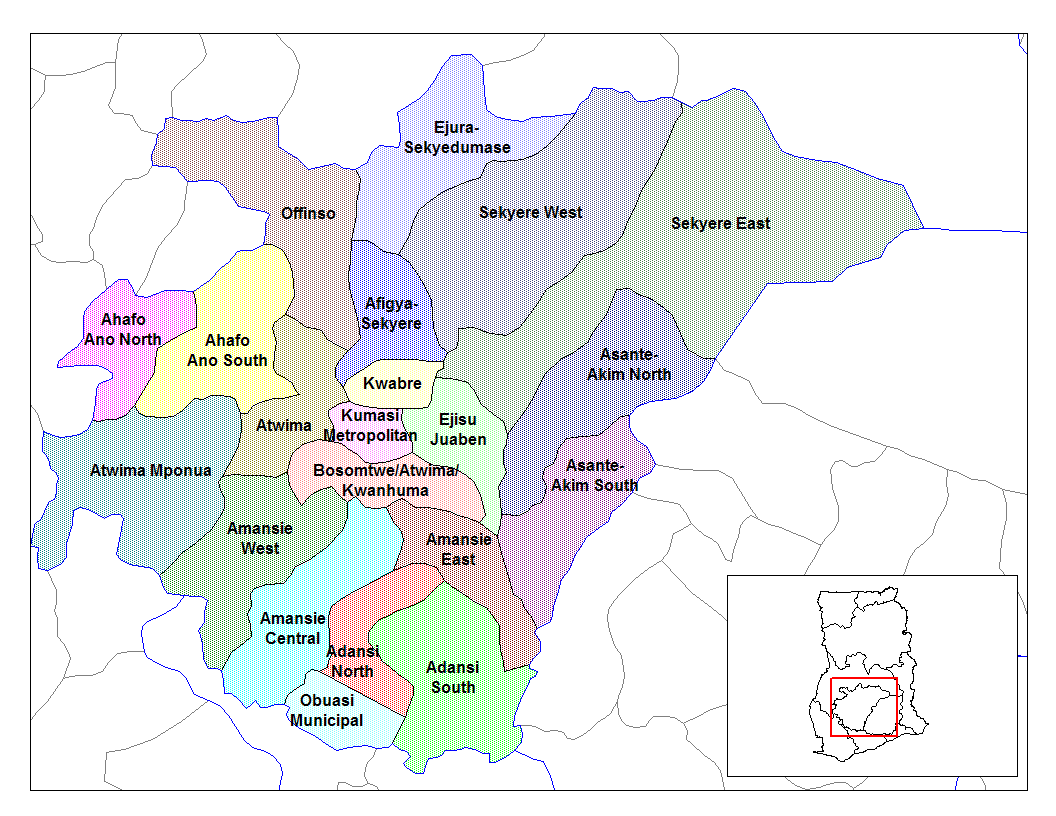
The mine collapse occurred in Dompoase, a suburb of Kumasi city in the Ashanti Region of Ghana.

== Incident ==
On November 12, 2009, a collapse occurred in an unlicensed, privately owned gold mine in Dompoase, Ashanti Region, Ghana. Up to 30 miners were prospecting the mine when it collapsed because of a landslide. At least 18 workers were killed in the collapse, including 14 women and the owner of the mine.

The mine owner had contracted 6 men and 24 women to work the mine. The men performed the mining and digging, while the women carried out the soil for sorting. A 27-year-old survivor in a hospital claimed that she was the last person out of the mine and stated that everyone would have escaped were it not for a large tree that fell during the landslide.

== Response ==
In the aftermath, police authorities launched an investigation into the collapse, probing possible criminal negligence. The police commander in the Western Region of Ghana, Kojo Antwi Tabi, called the disaster "the biggest mining tragedy that has ever hit Ghana". He also stated that he believed the government should take more measures to control the activities conducted in the mines.

Rescue teams continued to search for additional survivors, but feared further collapse made operations dangerous. Identification of the bodies posed significant challenges: many of the workers were galamsey miners, some not native to Ghana, and lacked formal documentation.

Safety measures in the mine were described as "poor or nonexistent".
