= List of rulers of the Fante Confederation =

Rulers and Signatories of the Fante Confederation

(Dates in italics indicate de facto continuation of office)

Fante Confederacy
1868	Bɔrbɔr, Denkyira, Twifo, Ahanta, Assin, Wassa states & Etsi people (Shama, Asebu, Oguaa, Simpa, Awutu etc) form first modern state in Africa called the Fante Confederacy States; under the Constitution of Mankessim, 1871
Signatories of the constitution
1868	King Mankessim Kwesi Edu; King Abora Amfo Otu; King Assin Kudmin Inhié and Tshibu Dhahon; King Ayan Kuo Yanfo; King Edgimaku Kudmin Mayua; King Inkosokoomper Esando; King Komminda Kudgse Okro; Chief Abakrampa Kwesi Nakko; Chief Abbankrom Kwarsu Arkwayno; Chief Abuardi Kwa Amissa; Chief Ahiru Kobina Bovada; Chief Akrofome Kwesi Ansa; Chief Ampinafon Brelwi; Chief Arnun Luabina Sason; Chief Balhyn Kuo Sassan; Chief Bohhen Kwabina Odom; Chief Bokan Kwesi Bekki; Chief Dominassié Thomas Salomon; Chief Donassié James Simons; Chief Dongua Kwarsu Yarsu; Chief Impessidardi Kwesi Buargua; Chief Kwaman Luassié Larla; Chief Mankessim Kobina Archwayo; Chief Odomana Kwamina Atta; Chief Saltpond Luabina Luagrene; Chief Joseph Graham; Chief Tchafu Kwesi Imana; Chief Zuarko Kofi Adoobah
Tenure	Incumbent	Notes
1868 to 1869	Kwesi Edu, Omanhene of Mankessim, Co-president
1868 to 1869	Amfo Otu, Omanhene of Abora, Co-president
1868 to 1869	Otabil, Omanhene of Gomoa, Co-president
18 November 1871 to July 1872	Kwasi Edo, Omanhene of Mankessim, King-President
18 November 1871 to July 1872	Anfo Oto, Omanhene of Abora, King-President
July 1872 to 1873	Kwesi Edu, Omanhene of Mankessim, King-President
1873	Dissolution of the Fante Confederacy

== See also ==
- Akan people
- Ghana
- Gold Coast
- Lists of incumbents
