= Kingdom of Twifo =

Former Akan state in present-day Ghana (16th–19th century)

Kingdom of Twifo Twifo
- Before 1600–19th century
- Status: Former kingdom
- Capital: Hemang
- Common languages: Twi
- Religion: Akan religion
- Government: Monarchy
- Omanhene
- History
  - Establishment: Before 1600
  - Subjugation by Denkyira: late 17th century
  - Alliance with Asante in inland wars: early 18th century
  - Secession from Asante and alliance with British: 1823–1826
  - Disestablished: 19th century
- Currency: Gold dust; Cowries
- Today part of: Ghana

Twifo was an early Akan state established during the initial Akan settlement of the Adanse forest. As the Akan expanded southward, the Twifo emerged as one of the key inland gold-producing polities. By the early 16th century, European sources identified Twifo as a prominent gold trading state located near the forest zone, with its early capital at Hemang. European traders noted the high quality of gold from this region and referred to the people by various names, likely corrupted attempts to render "Twifo".

== History ==
=== Oral traditions and settlement ===
According to F. K. Buah, Twifo oral traditions maintain that their ancestors migrated from the Bono state through the Adansi region before settling near the Ofin and later the Pra, establishing themselves around Hemang. Over time, other Akan groups joined them, and many of these arrivals adopted the Twifo identity. By the seventeenth century the Twifo were among the earliest states established in the Central Region. Their settlement predates most other Akan states in the area, and they gradually absorbed groups such as Mokwaa, Hemang, and Afutuakwa, who were of Etsi origin.

=== Regional role in the seventeenth century ===
European sources from the sixteenth and seventeenth centuries identified Twifo as one of the major inland gold-producing states. Dutch accounts recorded the kingdom under various names, including Kuiforo and Cuffroo. By the mid-seventeenth century, Twifo-Heman was a prominent inland town and market center, integrated into the north–south caravan trade that linked the forest zone to the Atlantic coast. Akani trading caravans passed through Twifo en route to inland mining districts and coastal markets, linking it to wider regional commerce.

During this period Twifo came under pressure from larger inland powers. In 1658–1659 the state fought wars with Assin that disrupted regional commerce. By the later seventeenth century they were subordinated to Denkyira, which dominated the Pra basin. Denkyira’s tribute demands were heavy: in 1700 it invaded Twifo and forced King Akafo to pay over £800 in gold. After Denkyira’s defeat by the Asante Empire at the Battle of Feyiase in 1701, Twifo joined other Denkyira tributaries in blocking arms supplies to their former overlord and subsequently aligned with Asante.

=== Conflicts and alliances ===
Twifo played a major role in the Komenda Wars. In 1690 the Dutch signed a defensive alliance with Twifo, promising munitions worth about £640 and protection for their “property, women and children.” English agents attempted to hire Twifo armies for £2,400, but were unsuccessful. In 1693 the Dutch made payments to prevent a Twifo–Komenda war, and in 1694 they attempted to bribe Twifo armies to attack Komenda, drawing Twifo into the wider conflict. When Komenda blocked Dutch access to the interior, Twifo fought alongside the Dutch until defeated in 1695, when English-backed forces drove away Twifo and Kabes Terra soldiers.

Relations with coastal brokers remained complex. In 1703 Dutch records noted that Twifo traders were being obstructed from reaching Elmina by Komenda intermediaries, while English officials spread rumors of Twifo cooperation with Ashanti against the Dutch forts. In the same year Kurankyi of Akanni attacked Twifo, killing King Amba, before negotiating with the Dutch to reopen the trade routes. By the 1710s, Twifo was part of a shifting anti-Asante bloc with Denkyira, Akyem, and Agona. In 1715–1716 Twifo clashed with John Kabes of Komenda in disputes over pawned individuals and trade rights. The conflict escalated into ambushes and seizures, halting commerce until the Asantehene mediated a settlement. The same year, Twifo forces took part in the Asante–Wassa campaign against Aowin, helping to impose a fine of £2,000 and several slaves on the defeated Aowin rulers. European accounts described Twifo at this time as a “scattered nation” that lived by raiding and plunder, often blocking trading paths and seizing merchants.

Throughout the late 1710s Twifo continued to exploit regional instability. Along with Wassa and Aowin, they raided Ashanti villages in 1719–1721, enslaving captives and selling them to the coast. At other times Twifo supplied auxiliaries to Asante armies, as in the 1726 campaign against Wassa led by Kodwo Abbe Tekki. Twifo alliances extended to the coast. At times they cooperated with the Fante Confederacy, intercepting Asante traders attempting to reach European forts directly. Later, however, Fante support for Assin in its disputes with Twifo limited Dutch willingness to provide direct military aid to their Twifo allies. In the mid-eighteenth century Twifo also entered into broader coalitions: by the 1740s they allied with Wassa and Fante against Asante expansion, and by 1765 a new Fante–Wassa–Twifo coalition sought to block Asante access to western trade routes.

=== Nineteenth century and fragmentation ===
During the eighteenth century Twifo alternated between conflict and alliance with the Coastal Coalition polities. At times it joined Fante, Wassa, and Akyem in resisting Asante expansion southwards. Twifo also lay along one of the most important north–south trade corridors: markets at Twifo Praso and Assin Manso became key entrepôts for slaves purchased from Asante and resold to merchants bound for Anomabo, Cape Coast, and Elmina. These markets tied Twifo directly into the transatlantic slave trade during its peak in the eighteenth century.

Despite its strategic role, Twifo remained vulnerable to larger powers. European observers described it as a small state “living by plunder,” often blocking or taxing caravans moving through its territory. In 1719–1721 Twifo joined Wassa and Aowin in raiding Ashanti villages, selling captives at the coast, which deepened tensions with Kumasi. Although it occasionally aided Asante armies, such as in the 1726 campaign against Wassa, Twifo’s tributary status was marked by frequent revolts and shifting loyalties.

In the early nineteenth century, facing renewed Asante dominance, Twifo leaders seceded from the Asante alliance. During the Anglo–Asante wars of 1823–1826 they aligned with the British Empire, further weakening Asante control over the southern forest. By the mid-nineteenth century, the centralized Twifo polity had fragmented into semi-autonomous divisions, though the broader Twifo identity persisted. These divisions—including Twifo Hemang, Twifo Mampong, Tufoe, and Twifo-Atti Morkwa—retained local authority under the framework of British colonial administration.

== Society ==
=== Urban centers and population ===
By the seventeenth century, Twifo-Heman was a major inland town. Contemporary reports compared it to Adumangya, Abotakyi, and Nyanaoase, with some settlements covering more than a square mile. Population estimates are uncertain, but evidence suggests that large Twifo towns may have exceeded 10,000 inhabitants by the mid-seventeenth century. The surrounding villages and farms supplied food, while markets and toll stations integrated Twifo into the regional economy.

=== Slavery and retainers ===
Twifo society incorporated servile labor acquired through trade and warfare. From the fifteenth century Dyula caravans supplied slaves to Twifo-Heman, and archaeological evidence confirms the presence of northern "Donko" captives in the town during the seventeenth century. The Assin–Twifo War of 1657–1659 produced large numbers of captives who were sold through coastal ports. In addition to household retainers, powerful Twifo nobles founded villages (crooms) that housed their dependents and clients along key trade routes.

=== Politics and military ===
European accounts often portrayed Twifo as a polity of raiders and toll collectors, describing it in the early eighteenth century as a "scattered nation" that lived by plunder. Political authority was vested in the Omanhene, supported by a council of chiefs and subordinate headmen from dependent towns and villages. The Twifo state thus functioned as a hierarchical polity, with tributary communities contributing produce, labor, and military service.

Although often subordinated to larger powers, Twifo retained a degree of autonomy. In the seventeenth century it was incorporated into the sphere of Denkyira, and after 1701 it became a tributary of the Asante Empire. Under Asante overlordship Twifo was required to supply gold, slaves, and soldiers for imperial campaigns, but it resisted this authority through periodic revolts and obstructions of trade routes. By the early nineteenth century, Twifo chiefs shifted allegiance to the British Empire during the Anglo–Asante conflicts.

Like other Akan forest states, Twifo maintained sizable armies. Although exact numbers are uncertain, European observers believed that inland polities such as Twifo could mobilize several thousand men, often outnumbering coastal states. Its forces were equipped with muskets acquired from Dutch and English traders, and occasionally small cannon. In 1659 Elmina officials reported cannon requested for use against Twifo, while in 1713 the Twifo ruler Okafo borrowed muskets and powder on credit from Dutch factors at Shama to finance a campaign against Assin.

== Divisions ==
=== Akani ===
The relationship between Twifo and the wider Akani world has been debated by historians. Seventeenth-century European records often referred to an inland "kingdom of Acania", sometimes treating it as a single state and at other times as a shifting confederation of Akan polities. Twifo, located between the Pra and Ofin rivers, frequently appeared in these accounts as one of the leading Akani states.

According to Rebecca Shumway, "Akani" may never have constituted a centralized kingdom, but rather a network of caravan traders and allied communities, including Twifo, Wassa, and the Akyem kingdoms, who organized long-distance gold trade routes from the forest interior to the coast. This ambiguity in early sources has complicated modern efforts to distinguish between Twifo’s independent political identity and its association with the Akani confederation.

=== Morkwa ===
Under Nana Amo Kwaw, the Morkwa crossed the Pra River and settled near Twifo-Hemang. Although they arrived later than the core Hemang group, they adopted the Twifo identity and maintained close ties with the main polity.

=== Mampong, Tufoe, and Hemang ===
Led by Nana Ampontenfi, the Mampong group migrated from Nkawie in the Asante region and initially settled at Jukwa. Around 1831 they negotiated land rights with Hemang authorities, becoming tributary settlers and identifying themselves as part of Twifo.

== Economy ==
=== Gold mining ===
Gold formed the basis of Twifo prosperity. Archaeological finds near the Jimi River, northwest of Hemang, include shafts, brass pans, gold weights, spoons, and ornaments associated with seventeenth-century mining activity. Contemporary European traders frequently remarked on the high quality of Twifo gold. Gold dust was used as currency alongside cowry shells.

Control over gold production and trade routes made Twifo an important inland power. European observers noted that the state sometimes blocked roads, levied tolls on caravans, or plundered merchants passing through its territory. Twifo was also directly involved in the regional slave trade, supplying captives through warfare and serving as a transit hub for enslaved people moving from Asante markets toward the coast. In particular, Twifo Praso and Assin Manso became key nodes linking Asante caravans to the slave depots at Anomabo, Cape Coast, and Elmina.

Both Denkyira and later Asante repeatedly targeted Twifo territory to control its goldfields, extracting tribute and enforcing political dominance in exchange for access to firearms.

=== Markets ===
By the 1660s and 1670s, Twifo established specialized weekly markets that redistributed European imports brought inland from the ports of Elmina, Anomabo, and Cape Coast Castle. Unlike general agricultural markets, these were focused on trade goods such as textiles, metal basins, and firearms. Slave markets near Twifo Praso formed part of the major north–south trade routes, connecting inland captives to the coastal entrepôts of Anomabo, Cape Coast, and Elmina.In November 1693, a group of Twifo merchants purchased over 31,000 dambas worth of merchandise at Cape Coast Castle, reflecting the kingdom’s role as a major inland consumer and distributor of imported goods.

=== Roads and caravan trade ===
Twifo occupied a strategic position in the inland caravan network. The “Twifo Road” linked Cape Coast through Abrem and Apumase to Twifo-Heman, continuing north to Assin and Denkyira. A parallel “Arcania Road” ran further east. These routes were heavily used by Akani traders and Dyula caravans carrying gold and slaves south and returning with European goods. Tolls were collected at Apumase and Twifo-Heman, making the latter a key inland market town in the seventeenth century.

== Legacy ==
By the nineteenth century, the centralized Twifo state had fragmented into distinct traditional divisions. Nevertheless, Twifo identity persisted through its ruling lineages and stools. Today, the principal Twifo divisions are Twifo Hemang, Twifo Mampong, Tufoe, and Twifo-Atti Morkwa, each maintaining its own traditional authority within modern Central Region chieftaincy structures.

== See also ==
- Great Akan
- Akwamu Empire
- Kingdom of Denkyira
- Asante Empire
- Fante Confederacy
- Akan states

== Sources ==
- Fynn, J. K. (1964). Ashanti and Her Neighbours c. 1700–1807 (PhD thesis). SOAS University of London. p. 39.
- Buah, F. K. (1998). A History of Ghana. London: Macmillan.
- Konadu, Kwasi (2010). The Akan Diaspora in the Americas. New York: Oxford University Press. pp. 6, 93.
- Law, Robin (2012). "Fante Expansion Reconsidered: Seventeenth-Century Origins". Transactions of the Historical Society of Ghana. 14: 41–78. JSTOR 43855021.
- Daaku, Kwame Yeboa (1970). Trade and Politics on the Gold Coast, 1600–1720: A Study of the African Reaction to European Trade. Oxford: Clarendon Press. ISBN 019821653X.
- Fynn, J. K. (1987). "The Political System of the Fante of Ghana during the Pre-Colonial Period". Unwersitas (University of Ghana, Legon). 9.
- Kea, Ray A. (1982). Settlements, Trade, and Polities in the Seventeenth Century Gold Coast. Baltimore and London: Johns Hopkins University Press. ISBN 978-0-8018-2310-7.
- Shumway, Rebecca (2011). The Fante and the Transatlantic Slave Trade. Rochester Studies in African History and the Diaspora. Vol. 52 (illustrated, reprint ed.). University of Rochester Press. ISBN 9781580463911.
