= Don Toase =

English footballer

Personal information
- Full name: Donald Vickers Toase
- Date of birth: 31 December 1929
- Place of birth: Darlington, County Durham, England
- Date of death: 1992 (aged 62) (Note: Toase's death was registered in June 1992, in the Darlington registration district of County Durham.)
- Place of death: Darlington, England
- Position: Full back

Senior career*
Years	Team	Apps	(Gls)
–	Portsmouth	0	(0)
1948–1951	Newcastle United	0	(0)
1951–1952	Darlington	7	(0)
–	South Shields		
- * Club domestic league appearances and goals

Donald Vickers Toase (31 December 1929 – 1992) was an English footballer who played as a full back in the Football League for Darlington. He was on the books of Portsmouth and Newcastle United, without playing League football for either, and played non-league football for South Shields.

Toase played for the England youth team that won the inaugural edition of the FIFA Youth Tournament in 1948 (which became the UEFA European Under-19 Championship).
