= James Anquandah =

Ghanaian historian (1938–2017)

- Born: James Robert Kwesi Anquandah; 10 April 1938
- Died: 10 September 2017 (aged 79)
- Citizenship: Ghanaian
- Education: University of Ghana, Oxford University
- Scientific career
- Fields: Archaeology
- Workplaces: University of Ghana, Oxford University

James Kwesi Anquandah (10 April 1938 – 7 September 2017) was Ghana's first trained archaeologist and the first Ghanaian to head the Department of Archaeology at the University of Ghana. He spent much of his career at the University of Ghana, where he played a central role in shaping the country's archaeological training, research, and public understanding of heritage.

== Early life and education ==
James Kwesi Anquandah was born on 10 April 1938 to Robert Anquandah and Amy Graham‑Wilberforce Anquandah. He completed his secondary education in 1959 at Achimota School and later obtained a Bachelor of Arts (Honours) degree in history from the University of Ghana in 1963, followed by a Postgraduate Diploma in Archaeology from the same university in 1965. He continued his studies abroad, earning a Master of Letters (M.Litt.) degree in archaeology from the University of Oxford between 1965 and 1967. According to Professor Merrick Posnansky (Professor of History and Anthropology at the University of California, Los Angeles and a former don at the University of Ghana), Anquandah "was the first West African to gain a post‑graduate qualification at a West African university." After two decades in the lecture hall, Anquandah pursued a Certificate in University Teaching at UCOSDA University in England from 1995 to 1996 to strengthen his teaching expertise.

== Career ==
Anquandah worked at the state‑owned Ghana Broadcasting Corporation (GBC) as a Programs Officer from 1959 to 1960, and later served as Senior Producer from 1972 to 1973, producing programmes on the history, culture, and heritage of Ghana. While in the United Kingdom, Anquandah was employed at the Pitt Rivers Museum at the University of Oxford. He returned to Ghana and worked as a research fellow at the Department of Archaeology and the Institute of African Studies, University of Ghana, until 1975, when he became the first West African lecturer in archaeology. Still at the University of Ghana, Anquandah rose through the academic ranks and became a full professor in 1994. He served in various administrative roles, including Head of the Department of Archaeology from 1981 to 1993, Dean of the Faculty of Social Studies from 1991 to 1997, and Acting Pro‑Vice‑Chancellor of the University of Ghana in January and February 1996. He also served on a number of boards and committees within the university.
