= Asare Bediako Senior High School =

Mixed second cycle institution in Akrokerri, Ghana

Location
- Akrokerri, Ashanti Region; Ghana
- Coordinates: 6.298°N 1.640°W

Information
- Type: secondary/high school
- Motto: Knowledge and Hard Work
- Established: 1993 (33 years ago)
- Grades: Forms [1-3]
- Nickname: ABSEC

Asare Bediako Senior High School (also known as ABSEC) is a mixed second cycle institution in Akrokerri in the Adansi North District in the Ashanti Region of Ghana.

== History ==
The school was established in 1993. In 2012, the headmaster of the school was Mr. C. W. Nuakoh. In 2017, Anglogold Ashanti provided the school with mechanized boreholes and water tanks. In 2021, the headmaster of the school was Dr. Emmanuel Asiedu. In 2021, Helping Africa Foundation provided the school with ICT centers.

The school motto is "Knowledge and Hard Work".

The Obuasi Area of the Church of Pentecost donated 200 desks to support the school due to inadequate furniture for students.

== Features ==
The school is close to a waterlogged valley and sits on about 75-acres of land.
