= Dompoase =

Town in Ashanti Region, Ghana

- Village
- Location within Ghana
- Coordinates: 6°16′N 1°25′W
- Country: Ghana
- Region: Ashanti Region
- District: Adansi North District
- Elevation: 669 ft (204 m)
- Time zone: GMT
  - Summer (DST): GMT

Dompoase, a suburb of Kumasi, and located in the Adansi North District in the Ashanti Region of Ghana. The place is known for Dompoase Senior High School. It is a town of 30,000 people in Ghana. Kumasi is the capital of the region, considered the wealthiest and most powerful in the nation. It is the area of most cocoa production, as well as gold mining.

== History ==
At the beginning of the 17th century, Dompoase was the capital of Adansi. It held this position until the mid-17th century.

In November 2009, Dompoase was the site of a collapse of an illegal gold mine, in which 18 people were killed, including 13 women. National officials said this was the worst mine collapse in Ghanaian history. It highlighted dangers for the galamseys, thousands of independent artisanal workers in gold mining who work by hand. Many women work as porters and sorters in such operations. In neighboring francophone nations, such workers are known as orpailleurs.

== Facilities ==
- Christ is the Answer Preparatory School
