= Oyoko (clan) =

Clan of Abusua people

The Oyoko is one of the eight major Abusua; its characteristic is patience. It is a clan from Ghana and the origins of the clan can be traced back to at least c. 1570. The Oyoko Clan is bigger than Bono. The Oyoko family traces its origins to the contemporary Akan Town of Techiman. The original Oyoko royal family of Techimanhene’s palace. The Asantehene and Techimanhene, in that case, are of the same clan.

== Totem ==
The Totem of the Oyoko people is the falcon or hawk.

== Ethnography ==
The royal family from which the Asantehene comes from are Ɔyɔko people. Its main towns are Kumasi, Juaben, Nsuta and new Juaben. Other towns are Kɔkɔfu, Bɛkwae, Mampɔnten, Bogyae, Dadiɛso, worawora, Ɔbogu, Asaaman, Adubiase, Pampaso, Kontaase, Kenyaase, Ntɔnso, Ahenkro, Boagyaa, Akɔkɔfɛ, Sekyere Oyoko,Sekyere Dadease.
