= Bretuo =

One of eight major clans of Akans in Ghana

Bretuo is one of the eight major Akan clans, a group of ethnic people in West Africa primarily located in Ghana as well as parts of Ivory Coast and Togo.

== Totem ==
The totem of the Bretuo people is the leopard, a large cat native to Africa and Asia.

== Notable towns ==
Some of the notable towns which are reported to have a Bretuo family member as chief include: Asante Mampong,Jamasi, Apaa, Ofoase, Brodekwano, Bodomase, Agogo Hwidiem and Beposo of the Bosomtwe district of Ghana.
