= Assin Manso Slave River Site =

Physical characteristics
- Mouth
  - coordinates: 5°31′27″N 1°10′07″W

The Assin Manso Ancestral Slave River also called Nnonkonsuo or Donkor Nsuo (singular) was one of the slave markets for gathering indigenes during the trans-Atlantic slave trade. It is located in the Central Region of Ghana, forty (40) kilometers along the Cape Coast-Kumasi highway.

It served as the final link in the slavery route from Northern Ghana.

Site entry in 2024

== The Last Bath ==
The Assin Manso Slave River Site served as the place where slaves had their last bath on African soil before being marched down to the slave castles of Elmina and Cape Coast along the coast. The site was referenced as the "great depot" through which the Asantes sent slaves to the coast and served as one of the largest eighteenth-century slave markets. Here, slaves were fed and allowed to rest for several days or weeks.

In 1998, Assin Manso was re-inscribed onto the map of African-diasporic historical imagination through the reburial of two slave ancestors (one from Jamaica, one from the United States) as part of an Emancipation Day ceremony.

== The Year of Return ==
The Assin Manso Slave River Site has grown in popularity over recent times as a result of the Year of Return campaign organised by the Ghana Tourism Authority under the auspices of the Government of Ghana. At the site, one will observe an Ancestral Graveyard (the Memorial Wall of Return) where most Africans write their names as a way of indicating the discovery of their roots. As part of the experience, tourists remove their shoes and walk barefoot down a path to the muddy river that runs through a bamboo grove where they place their hands in the water, and offer prayers in thanks for the opportunity to return.

The site is similar to others in the West African sub region like the Goree Island of Senegal, Badagry in Nigeria among others.
