= Asenie =

One of the eight major clans of the Akan people

Asenie is one of the eight major clans of the Akan.

== Totem ==
The totem of the Asenie people is the bat

== Major towns ==
The major towns of the Asenie include Amakom, Wenchi etc.
