= Beposo =

BEPOSO, GHANA
- Country: Ghana
- Region: Ashanti Region

Beposo is a town in the Bosomtwe District of the Ashanti Region Of Ghana.Beposo is approximately 40 kilometers west of Kumasi, the capital of the Ashanti Region. The town boasts of its great involvement in the educational sectors with a Secondary School {BEPOSO SENIOR HIGH SCHOOL} Also known as Great Besec Okatakyie Mmmaan Agricultural School. Beposo is the hometown of the founder of Oheneba Poku Foundation, Blaze Metals Resources and Blaze Financial Services a reputable company in Ghana. The school is a second cycle institution.
