= Toase =

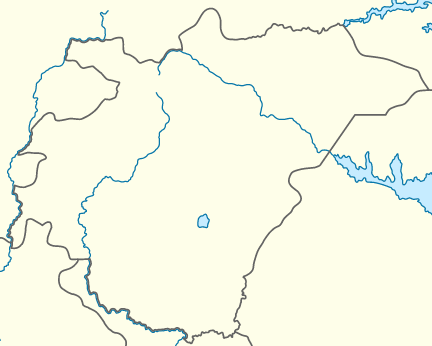
- Coordinates: 6°39′0″N 1°49′0″W
- Country: Ghana
- Region: Ashanti Region

Toase is a town in the Ashanti Region of Ghana. The town is known for the Toase Secondary School. The school is a second cycle institution.
