= Akwamu Empire =

Former state in present-day Ghana

Akwamu Empire Akwamu
- 16th century–1730 (as empire); 1886 (as independent kingdom)
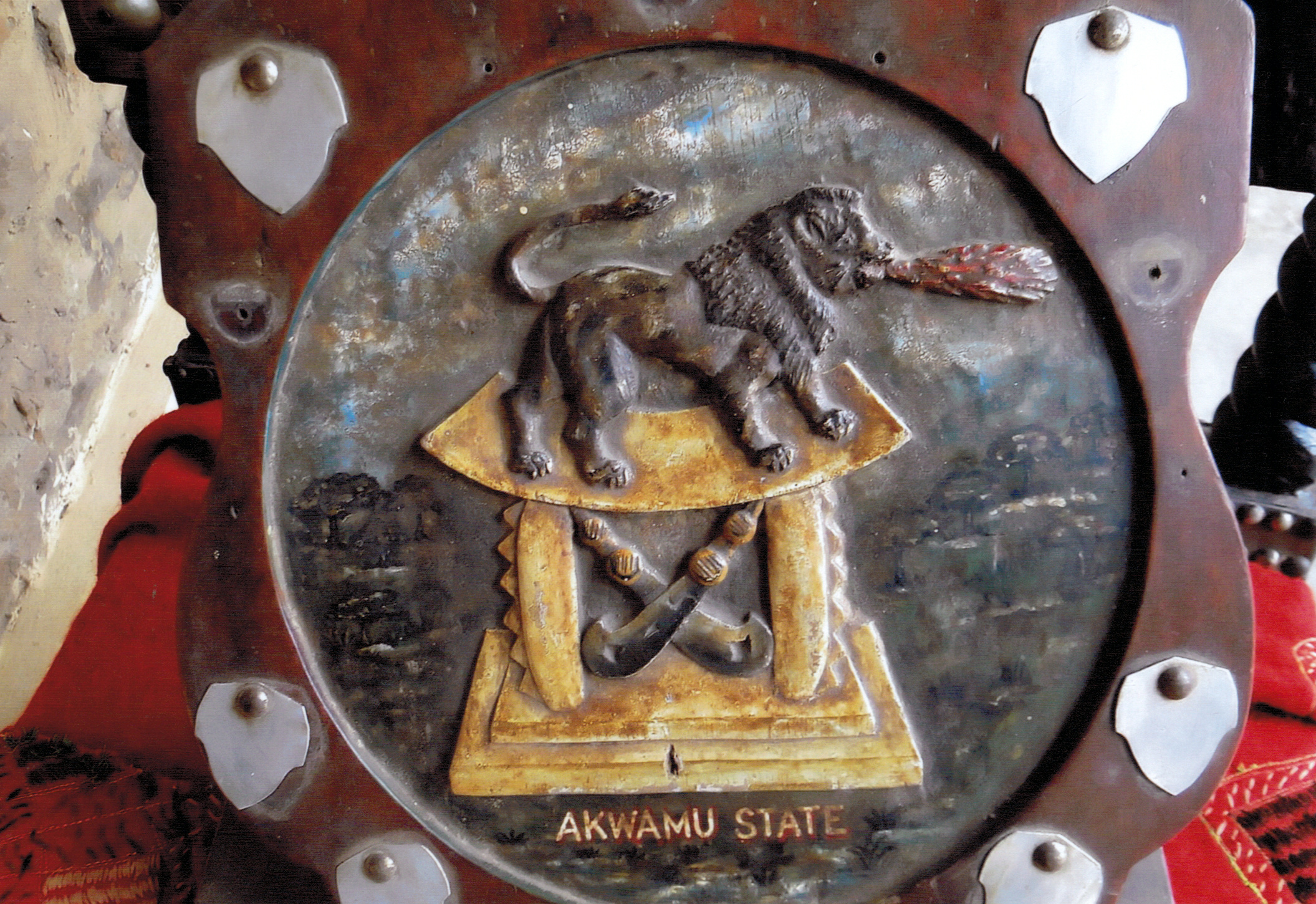
- Akwamu State Emblem
- Status: Former kingdom and empire
- Capital: Asamankese; Nyanoase; Nsachi; Akwamufie
- Common languages: Twi
- Religion: Akan religion
- Government: Monarchy
- Akwamuhene
- History
  - Established: 16th century
  - Migration from Twifo-Heman to Atewa Range and Akyem area: 16th–early 17th century
  - Founding of Nyanoase as capital: c. 1620s–1630s
  - Conquest of Accra: 1677
  - Expansion across the Volta River and capture of Whydah: 1702
  - Peak territorial extent (from Ouidah to Winneba): c. 1710
  - Defeated by Akyem, and allies; destruction of Nyanoase: 1730–1733
  - Incorporated into the Gold Coast Colony: 1886
  - Disestablished: 1730 (as empire); 1886 (as independent kingdom)
Preceded by
Kingdom of Twifo
Succeeded by
Kingdom of Dorma
Gyaman
Gold Coast (British colony)
- Today part of: Ghana; Togo; Benin

- People: Akwamufoɔ
- Language: Akwamu Twi
- Country: Akwamuman

The Akwamu Empire was an Akan state that rose in the 17th century in what is now southeastern Ghana. According to local tradition, the Akwamu trace their origins to the Kingdom of Twifo, but the earliest historical records place them inland, around the Atewa Hills and controlling trade routes between the coast and the inland forest. Akwamu developed into an expansionist state that enforced authority over many territories through military conquest, tributary networks, and control of regional trade. At the height of its power in the late 17th and early 18th centuries, the Akwamu Empire extended approximately 400 kilometres (250 mi) along the Gulf of Guinea, from Ouidah in present-day Benin to Winneba in modern Ghana.

== History ==
=== Origins ===
According to Akwamu oral tradition, the royal Abrade clan originally ruled over the Kingdom of Twifo. Twifo was an early Akan state located in the forest region of southern Ghana, in what is today the Twifo-Hemang area south of the Pra River near its confluence with the Ofin. After the death of the fifth ruler, a succession dispute developed within the polity, leading a section of the ruling lineage under Otomfo Asare to break away and establish a new dynasty at Asamankese, which means “Asare’s capital town.” At Asamankese, the migrants went on to establish the Akwamu state.

=== Early Akwamu in European accounts ===
The earliest reference to Akwamu appears on a Dutch Map of the Gold Coast dated to 1629, which described the state as diefachtich volck, or “a predatory nation.” According to Ivor Wilks, the description referred to the strict control placed on merchants using routes that passed through their territory. Early European records referred to Akwamu as Aquamboe and Oquie. A report from 1646 described Oquie as lying three to four Dutch miles north of Great Accra, with the eastern limits of control included Latebe, modern day Larteh.

=== Establishing coastal dominance ===
The consolidation of Akwamu's imperial power began with a series of decisive military campaigns in the late 17th century. In 1677, Akwamuhene Nana Ansa Sasraku I launched a major attack against the Ga kingdom of Accra. The inland capital was captured and destroyed, and the reigning Ga monarch, Okai Koi, was executed along with his heir. Survivors of the invasion sought refuge beneath the protection of European forts along the coast, primarily in Christiansborg Castle.

Due to Accra being weakened, Akwamu expanded its further east and in 1679, its armies overran the Adangme-speaking kingdom of Ladoku, adding trade centers like Ningo, Kpone, and Prampram into the empire. The victories secured Akwamu's strategic control over the coastal plain and positioned it to dominate commerce flowing between the interior and the Atlantic.

=== Control of Christiansborg and the annexation of Accra ===
In 1680, a mutiny within the Danish at Christiansborg Castle led by Pieter Bolt, resulted in the seizure of the fort and its sale to Juliam de Campos Barreto, a former Portuguese governor of São Thomé. The Portuguese then garrisoned the fort and renamed it São Francisco Xavier. The temporary collapse of Danish authority at Osu gave Akwamu a military advantage. Between 1680 and 1681, the remaining Ga towns, Small Accra, Osu, and Labadi, were defeated in a series of battles and annexed. European traders wrote that the settlements were largely depopulated, with many residents fleeing eastward to Little Popo and Whydah.

For the next fifty years, Accra remained a province of Akwamu. Forts were taxed, trade routes were controlled, and Ga towns were governed through Akwamu-appointed officials. The conquest of Accra gave Akwamu direct access to coastal revenues and solidified its reputation as the dominant power.

=== Asante connection and Sasraku's final campaigns ===
In Akwamu traditions, Nana Ansa Sasraku I played an important role in the early political formation of the Asante state. During the late 17th century, Osei Tutu, a royal of Kumasi, sought refuge at the Akwamu court while fleeing Denkyira overlordship. In the Akwamu capital he met spiritual leader Okomfo Anokye. Ansa Sasraku protected Osei Tutu and supported his return to Kwaman. With Akwamu assistance, Osei Tutu was able to consolidate power in Kumasi and eventually lead a coalition of towns that resisted Denkyira control. Though Asante and Akwamu would later pursue separate imperial trajectories.

In 1689, Ansa Sasraku led his final major military campaign against the kingdom of Agona. The queen of Agona was captured, and the coastal town of Bereku (Senya Bereku) was annexed. This was the last major extension of Akwamu's western frontier.

=== Expansion east of the Volta and north ===
Following Ansa Sasraku's death, leadership passed to Nana Addo Panin and Nana Basua in a brief period of joint rule. In 1693, under Basua's direction, Akwamu forces seized Christiansborg Castle from the Danes through a strategic ambush led by the Akwamu broker Asameni. The fort was held by Akwamu for about a year, during which trade continued under the Danish flag. After Basua's death, power consolidated under Nana Ado, who turned Akwamu's military ambitions eastward. In early 1702, an initial invasion across the Volta River was repelled, but Akwamu forces regrouped and launched a successful offensive. Little Popo was captured in April, followed by the seizure of Whydah in May. Though Whydah was eventually destroyed by Dahomey in the 1720s, it remained tributary to Akwamu for over two decades. This phase of eastern expansion was the furthest geographic extent of the Akwamu Empire. The campaigns were driven by the strategic goal of controlling commercial corridors between the Gold Coast and the eastern Slave Coast. Akwamu incorporated a number of coastal and inland states into its tributary network.

Ado was succeeded by Akonno in 1703. During his reign, Akwamu extended its influence further north and northeast, launching successful campaigns against Krepi and Kwahu. By 1710, the empire had reached its peak, encompassing much of what is now southeastern Ghana. By the early eighteenth century, the authority of the Nyanaoase government extended from Agona in the west to the borders of Whydah in the east, covering more than 200 miles along the coast and over 100 miles inland. hrough control of coastal ports and inland trade corridors, the state exercised political and military authority across much of the eastern Gold Coast and the western Slave Coast.

=== Decline and fall ===
By the 1720s internal divisions had weakened the Akwamu state. A civil war developed within the country, resulting in the defeat of the faction aligned with the reigning Akwamuhene. Many of the king’s allies were captured and sold into slavery. In 1730 a coalition of forces from the northwest and west destroyed Nyanaoase and occupied much of the western territories of the empire. The political and military structure centered on Nyanaoase collapsed during this period. Following these events, Akyem forces annexed the Akwamu heartland. The surviving Akwamu leadership fled eastward across the Volta River. A smaller state was formed at Akwamufie in the early 1730s, but the earlier imperial structure was not restored.

=== Post-Empire ===
Although Akwamu lost its western territories following the 1730–31 invasion by Akyem. it continued to exist as a significant political entity. By the late 18th century, the kingdom had regained some influence and expanded eastward once again. In the 19th century, Akwamu maintained its autonomy and participated in regional politics. During the third and fourth Anglo-Ashanti wars, Akwamu initially offered support to the Asante Empire but later withdrew, reportedly due to a diplomatic agreement signed with the British government in 1867. Despite this, Akwamu and Asante remained close allies, often coordinating militarily. One such collaboration allegedly occurred during the "Krepi War" of 1869.

== Divisions ==
Akwamu’s core territory lay in the forested highlands around the Atewa Range. The Birim Valley separated this area from the Kwahu escarpment to the north, while the middle reaches of the Densu River marked the western limit. The state was situated in the hinterland of Agona and lay across the inland trade routes linking the coast with Kwahu, Akyem, and the northern interior. According to Ludwig Roemer, Akwamu proper was small enough that its king could summon his nobles with a cannon shot, while the wider empire encompassed a much larger population.

=== Nyanoase ===
According to Ray Kea, capital at Nyanoase was the largest urban settlement in the state and a metropolitan district with over twenty surrounding towns. Seventeenth-century accounts describe its broad central street, lined with council houses, treasury buildings, shrines, and the royal palace, around which residential quarters were organized. A Danish report from the late seventeenth century estimated the town at nine miles long and half a mile wide, with a population concentrated in an imperial heartland of nearly 100,000 inhabitants. In addition to the royal plantations, many nobles maintained estates around the capital that were worked by war resettled captives. Nyanaoase was the focal point of a densely populated metropolitan district. Within this district were twenty-two large and small towns. Together with Nyanaoase, they could mobilize thousands of men. Around the capital were large royal and state plantations. These were worked by unfree laborers, many of whom were war captives resettled in the rural hinterland during the seventeenth century. Similar plantations were held by leading nobles, known as abirempon.

=== Nsachi ===
In the mid-seventeenth century, the capital was moved to Nsachi, which was in the old Aburi state. The Aburi stool later retained ritual status as an Akwamu stool, despite the loss of political authority.

== Government ==
Until its destruction in 1730, Nyanaoase served as the imperial seat of government and the residence of the Akwamuhene. It was the largest urban center in the state and functioned as the political core of the empire.

=== Political structure ===
The Akwamuhene exercised authority through a hierarchy of senior officials known as abirempon. These officials combined judicial, military, and administrative responsibilities and formed the governing elite of the state. The Akwamuhene functioned as first among equals within this ruling group. Contemporary accounts indicate an institutionalized relationship between the “house” of the king and the “houses” of the leading abirempon, through which political authority was organized and maintained. From the ranks of the abirempon came the principal advisers of the king, senior army commanders, heads of administrative departments, and members of the state council, which managed the daily affairs of the empire.

=== Imperial administration ===
Imperial rule operated through a system of governorships. Coastal towns and inland districts were treated as dependent territories and assigned to designated abirempon, who acted as protectors or overlords. Although most abirempon resided in the metropolitan district, they exercised judicial and political authority within their assigned regions. This system allowed the central government at Nyanaoase to maintain control over distant territories through appointed officials rather than direct settlement. Political authority was therefore centralized in the metropolitan core but extended outward through this hierarchy of delegated offices.

=== Capital and state institutions ===
Within Nyanaoase, the principal state buildings were known as the rade huse. These included council buildings, courts, stool houses, the treasury, and shrines of the state deities. The area in which the rade huse were located formed the government quarter, referred to as the abanmu. This district functioned as the administrative and ceremonial center of the state.

== Society ==
Akwamu society in the late seventeenth and early eighteenth centuries was highly stratified and centered on the metropolitan district of Nyanaoase. Wealth and status were concentrated among the king and the abirempon, who formed an urban aristocracy distinguished by their households, retainers, and access to gold, imported goods, and slaves. Outside the metropolitan district, most rural communities were organized around peasant household production. These communities maintained their own internal structures but were incorporated into the wider political order through tribute obligations.

=== Labor and slavery ===
Servile labor formed an important component of Akwamu society, particularly in the capital region. Many war captives were resettled in the metropolitan hinterland, where they worked on royal and noble plantations or served in elite households. By the early eighteenth century, unfree labor constituted a significant proportion of agricultural production in the metropolitan district. This coexistence of peasant household labor in rural areas and servile plantation labor near the capital marked a distinct feature of Akwamu’s social organization.

=== Coastal communities ===
The coastal towns were socially and economically distinct from the metropolitan core. They included merchant-brokers, artisans, fishermen, salt-makers, and traders engaged in regional and overseas exchange. Some leading families in these towns were of Akwamu origin, while others were Ga, Adangme, or Ewe. Coastal society reflected a mix of local traditions and imperial oversight, shaped by trade and political subordination to Nyanaoase.

=== Europeans in Akwamu society ===
European traders residing in the coastal forts occupied a unique social position. European traders were referred to as the “wives” of the Akwamuhene; the term reflected their dependent status under the authority of the king. Even though they were semi-autonomous in their commercial activities, they remained integrated into the social hierarchy of the state and were subject to tribute payments, fines, and obligations defined by Akwamu authority.

== Military ==
Danish and English observers noted Akwamu's fearsome reputation. English trader Willem Bosman claimed that Akwamu was "very terrible to all their neighboring countries, except Akim."

=== Structure ===
According to historian Ivor Wilks, "Akwamu possessed such an array of cannon that Sir Dalby Thomas thought the days of European forts might well be over." Despite this artillery, the core of the army consisted of musketeers supported by bowmen and spearmen. The manpower at the disposal of the Nyanaoase administration fell into three categories: (1) conscripts from Akwamu towns and villages, (2) conscripts from tributary provinces, and (3) the household guards and armed retainers of the Akwamuhene and his nobles. While the first two groups were organized as town and village militia, the third formed a permanent corps of professional or semi-professional soldiers who provided cohesion in war. By the early eighteenth century, the Akwamuhene had a large body of hereditary slave-soldiers, known as sika den ("black gold"), who served as guards, police, and raiders, numbering several thousand men. Many nobles likewise maintained hereditary slaves who acted as personal guards. In this period the noble title obirempon shifted to emphasize military achievement rather than commerce; those distinguished in battle could be honored as owurafram, "masters of firearms."

=== Weapons and Tactics ===
The Akwamu army was the Gold Coast’s "military revolution," replacing shock combat with missile warfare between 1660 and 1680. By 1700 archers were no longer used in Akwamu armies due to musketeers being the primary weapon for soldiers. Coastal militia carried buccaneers or long-barreled flintlocks, while inland units used carbines and short "fuzees." Soldiers wore a standard cloth wrap with a white leather belt, cartridge pouch, and sword, while officers distinguished themselves with plumed straw hats. Lead musket balls were common, but iron slugs were also used. On the battlefield, Akwamu troops fought in extended formations designed for consistent volley fire. The formations were made up of combat units numbering from a few hundred to several thousand men. Success in battle depended on concentrated barrages that overwhelmed enemies.

=== Mercenaries and Asafo Companies ===
Seventeenth- and eighteenth-century sources describe Akwamu as a land of mercenaries. Soldiers were recruited from slaves, bonded dependents, runaway youths, and even bandits, who were integrated into military companies (asafo). The origins of the Akwamu asafo and Krontiri asafo were linked to such groups, who initially plundered travelers before becoming organized as state military companies. Akwamu troops also served as mercenaries abroad: in the 1690s, soldiers from Nyanaoase were hired by the ruler of Little Popo in a war against Whydah, receiving both valuables and the right to keep booty. European forts and African polities likewise employed Akwamu forces when their interests demanded, paying in gold or trade goods.

=== Mobilization and Campaign Impact ===
Contemporary reports estimated that Akwamu could mobilize between 25,000 and 50,000 soldiers by 1700, though such figures are likely inflated. Campaigns were nonetheless devastating: the conquest of Great Accra (1677–1681) and subsequent wars in Akuapem and Ladoku led to the depopulation of wide areas, with many thousands killed, enslaved, or displaced. After 1730, the destruction of Nyanaoase and its hinterland resulted in the near-total depopulation of the middle Densu basin.

== Economy ==
By the late sixteenth and early seventeenth centuries Akwamu functioned as a trade-oriented state centered on Nyanaoase. Its ruling class was composed of merchants and soldiers whose authority rested on the regulation of markets, taxation of trade, and control of circulation within its territory. Akwamu’s rulers organized wealth through a structured tribute system that drew resources from agrarian villages, towns, and coastal settlements.

=== Fiscal administration ===
Wealth moved through two main channels. One form consisted of commodity circulation, in which goods moved through markets and ports based on commercial transactions. The second form involved the appropriation of surplus through corvée labor, taxes, tribute, and fines. This second form was determined by the administrative and political structure of the state rather than by commercial exchange alone. Coastal towns and urban centers were assessed in imported merchandise, cowries, gold, livestock, salt, and locally produced craft goods. The scale of assessment often reflected the size and importance of the town. In addition to regular tribute, fines and extraordinary levies were imposed when necessary. In 1709 the Danes were fined more than twenty benda for supporting a coastal revolt, and in 1727 the English were fined ninety benda for disturbing trade. European forts were also required to pay ground rent in imported merchandise, cowries, or gold. Merchants were expected to present gifts to the king and leading officials and could be penalized for violations of Akwamu authority. By the late seventeenth century the regulation of tribute and surplus had become central to wealth distribution within the state. Nyanaoase developed into a regional credit center, where tribute wealth was reinvested as merchant capital and extended as loans to merchants and dependent rulers.

=== Agrarian Production ===
Agriculture provided the main economic foundation of the Akwamu state. Food from rural villages and plantations sustained the capital at Nyanaoase and supplied coastal settlements under Akwamu control. Large plantations were maintained around the metropolitan district and were worked by war captives and dependent laborers. These estates produced food for urban consumption and redistribution. Rural communities outside the metropolitan district cultivated their own lands and paid annual tribute in agricultural produce after harvest as a sign of submission to the Nyanaoase government. Food moved regularly between inland and coastal regions. Fish and salt were obtained from the coast, while livestock was brought from eastern coastal states such as Whydah and Ardra. Agricultural produce was supplied to coastal towns including Great Accra and transported inland to Adanse and Manso Nkwanta. Salt-making and fishing industries along the coast supplied regional markets as far inland as Kwahu.

=== Trade activity and ports ===
European overseas trade formed one part of Akwamu’s wider commercial system. The state supervised commodity circulation across a land-based exchange network linking the gold-producing districts of Akyem to the northwest, the inland polities of Dagbon and Gonja to the north, and the eastern coastal states of Ardra and Whydah. Merchandise imported through Akwamu-controlled ports was redistributed to these regions, and their exports were channelled back through Akwamu ports for overseas trade. The main port center was Accra, which consisted of English, Dutch, and Danish towns, each with its own European fort. By the early eighteenth century many ships arrived there each year. Smaller ports such as Labadi, Nungua, Tema, Great Ningo, Kpone, and Keta also operated within this network. Trade was regulated through royal brokers who supervised transactions between European traders and African merchants. The Nyanaoase government oversaw commodity relations between Akwamu and neighboring regions. The Akwamuhene could restrict access to the forts by closing inland trade routes during political disputes. In 1725 access to Accra was blocked until Dutch, English, and Danish traders made payments in merchandise. By the late seventeenth century the structure of exchange shifted from a primary emphasis on gold exports toward increased exports of enslaved people.

== Legacy ==
Akwamu captives, often classified under the broader labels "Mina" or "Coromantee" in the Americas, gained a reputation for resistance and rebellion. They were involved in major uprisings such as the 1733 St. John revolt and were widely regarded by colonial authorities as politically assertive and militarily capable. A number of them were transported to the Caribbean, where they were resettled on the island of St. John. While the civil war had already weakened the state, the final blow came in 1730–31 when Akyem forces, allied with formerly subordinate and oppressed vassals, invaded Akwamu territory.

== Interpretations ==
=== Ray A. Kea ===
Ray Kea argues that Akwamu’s development cannot be reduced to a simple response to European commercial expansion or the gun and slave cycle. He situates the state within longer patterns of regional political and economic organization.

== See also ==
- Akwamu People
- Kingdom of Twifo
- Akyem Kingdoms
- Adanse
- Asante Empire
- Assin
- Kingdom of Denkyira
- Akan people
- Apafram Festival
- Gold Coast
- Osu Castle
- Ga people
- Atlantic slave trade

== Sources ==
- Wilks, Ivor (1957). "The Rise of the Akwamu Empire, 1650–1710". Transactions of the Historical Society of Ghana. 3 (2): 25–62. JSTOR 41405705.
- Wilks, Ivor (1958). "A Note on Twifo and Akwamu". Transactions of the Historical Society of Ghana. 3 (3). Historical Society of Ghana: 215–217. JSTOR 41405715.
- Konadu, Kwasi (2010). The Akan Diaspora in the Americas. Oxford: Oxford University Press. doi:10.1093/acprof:oso/9780195390643.001.0001. ISBN 9780195390643.
- Swartz, Henri B. K.; Dumett, Raymond E. (2011). West African Culture Dynamics: Archaeological and Historical Perspectives. Walter de Gruyter. ISBN 9783110800685.
- Kea, Ray A. (1980). "Administration and Trade in the Akwamu Empire, 1681–1730". In Jack Goody; Susan Megarry (eds.). West African Culture Dynamics: Archaeological and Historical Perspectives. The Hague: Mouton. pp. 371–390. OCLC 928841891.
- Kea, Ray A. (1982). Settlements, Trade, and Polities in the Seventeenth Century Gold Coast. Baltimore and London: Johns Hopkins University Press. ISBN 978-0-8018-2310-7.
- Perbi, Akosua Adoma (2004). A History of Indigenous Slavery in Ghana: From the 15th to the 19th Century. Accra: Sub-Saharan Publishers. ISBN 9789988550950.
