= Assin Manso =

- Town
- Interactive map of Assin Manso
- Country: Ghana
- Region: Central Region

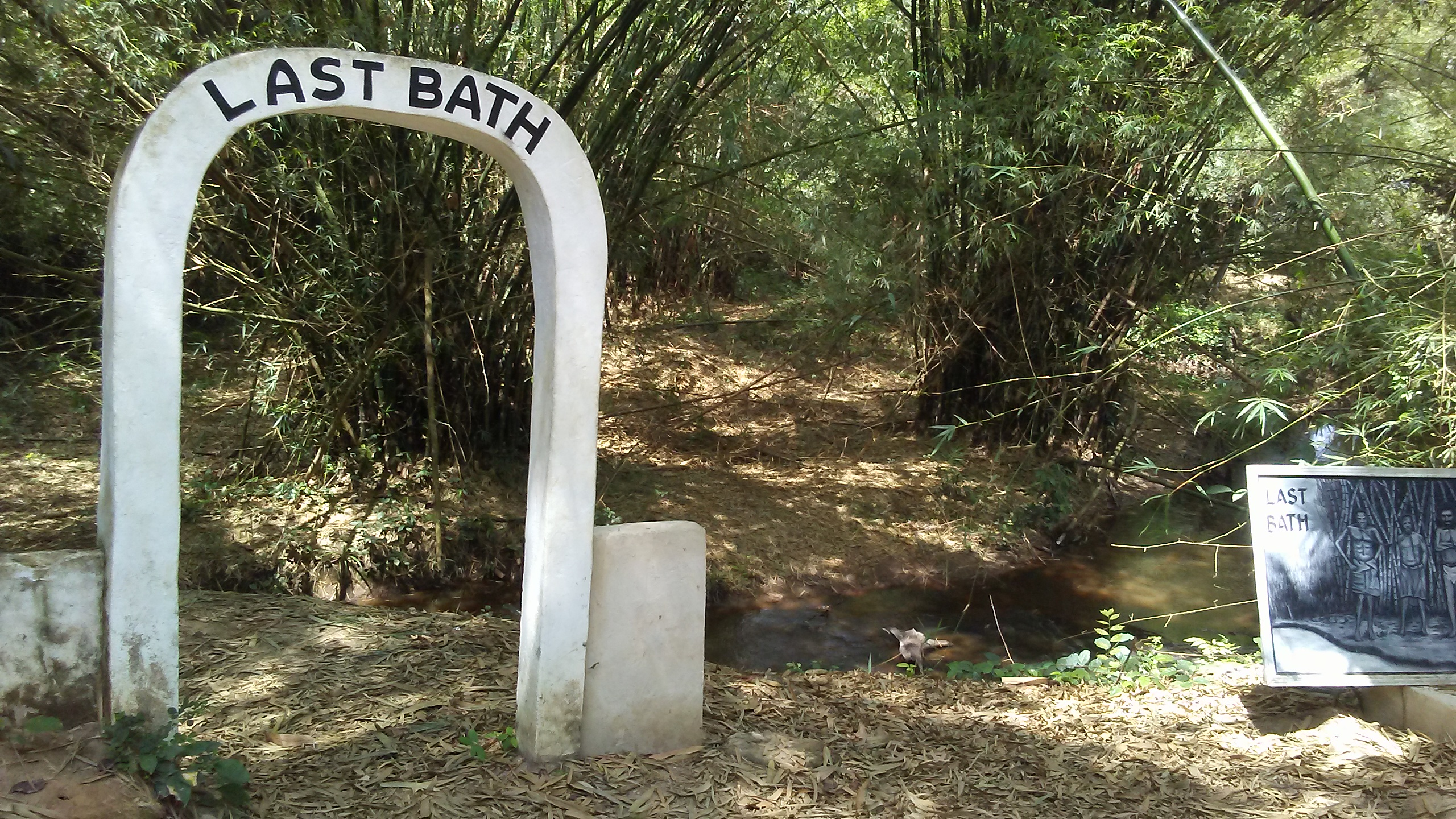
Memorial to the captives marched to the coast at Assim Manso, Ghana

Assin Manso is a town in the Central Region of Ghana. It is located 40 kilometers along the Cape Coast - Kumasi highway. The town is well known for the role it played as a slave market during the slave trade. It is also known for the Assin Manso Secondary School. The school is a second cycle institution.

== See also ==
- Assin Manso Slave River Site
