= Akrokerri =

Coordinates: 6°18′N 1°38′W

- Interactive map of Akrokerri
- Country: Ghana
- Region: Ashanti Region

Akrokerri is a town and a suburb of Obuasi in the Ashanti Region of Ghana. The town is located in the Adansi North District.

It is the home of the Akrokerri College of Education, formerly known as Akrokerri Training College or Akrokerri Teacher Training College. It is also home of Asare Bediako Senior High School.

There is a market day every Tuesday at Sampakrom.

Akrokerri is mentioned in the books of Nana Osei Tutu II, the Ashanti hene, as a town created by God(Odomankoma Ab)de3).
