= Asona =

One of the eight main Akan clans

Asona is one of the eight main Akan clans.

== Totem ==
The totem of the Asona people is the crow or snake.

== Major towns ==
The major towns of the Asona people include;Kyebi, Offinso, Ejisu, Mankessim, Sandema, Akropong Akuapem, Sekyere Beposo, Denkyira Buabenso, Denkyira Diaso, Atebubu, Amanokrom Akuapem, Obosomase Akuapem, Begoro, Kukurantumi, Akyem Asafo, Akyem Segymase, Akyem Pameng, Suhum, Akyem Akopong, Akyem Adoagyiri, Akyem Dwenase near Osino, Akyem Osiem, Akyem Osino, Akyem Takyiman, Akyem Ahwenease, Akyem Apinaman, Akyem Akooko, Akyem Hemang, Apinamang, Akyem Juaso, Akyem Takrowase, Akyem Bososo, Akyem Abaam, Akyem Asuotwene, Akyem Enyiresi, Akyem Akrofufu, Akyem Adankrono, Akyem Sawirako, Akyem Bomaa, Akyem Abodom, Akyem Sekyere, Akyem Bomso, Akyem Ankaase, Akyem Abompe near Osino, Akyem Osorase, Akyem Tweapease, Akyem Topreman, Akyem Akyem Banso, Akyem Ettukrom, Akyem Bosodumase, Akyem Ekorso, Akyem Koradaso, Akyem Asamama, Akyem Adadientam, Bonwire, Feyiase, Tano Odumase, Adanse Akrofuom, Manso Nkwanta, Onwe, Kwahu Nkwatia, Kwahu Tafo,
