= Ghanaian traditional rulers =

This article is a list of the monarchs of Ghana:

- Boamponsem
- King Ghartey IV
- Ghartey VII
- Nana Dokua
- Nana Kuntunkununku II
- Nana Kwaku Boateng
- Nana Nkuah Okomdom II
- Nana Obiri Yeboa
- Nana Ofori Atta II
- Nana Oti Akenten
- Ndewura Jakpa
- Ntim Gyakari
- Ofori Panyin I
- Okomfo Anokye
- Opoku Ware I
- Osei Bonsu
- Osei Kwame Panyin
- Osei Tutu Agyeman Prempeh II
- Osei Yaw Akoto
- Otumfuo Nana Osei Tutu I
- Otumfuo Nana Osei Tutu II
- Togbe Osei III
- Yaa Asantewaa
- Yaa Naa Yakubu II
