= Papa Nantwi Festival =

Festival in Ghana by the chiefs and peoples of Kumawu

The Papa Nantwi festival is an annual festival celebrated by the people of Kumawu in the Sekyere Kumawu district in the Ashanti Region of Ghana, in the month of March every year. It is a cultural festival commemorated by all Ashantis though the cultural events take place at Kumawu. The festival is used in commemorating the bravery and self-sacrificial spirit of their great ancestor, Nana Tweneboa Kodua (I) who is purported to have offered his life to be sacrificed to assist the Ashantis in defeating the Denkyiras, who were their overlords.

== Historical background ==
The festival is commemorated to mark the historical event that happened in the lives of the Ashanti Kingdom during the reign of Otumfuo Osei Tutu I. Oral tradition among the people of Kumawu has been that the Denkyiras, who were the overlords of the Ashantis, kept on harassing them, forcefully taking their lands, farms, wives and other properties. As a result, the first Ashanti King, Otumfuo Osei Tutu I made a giant effort in uniting the seven Akan clans to fight for their freedom from the Denkyiras. After a spiritual inquiry from the Akan deities and ancestors by the then spiritual leader and counsellor for Otumfuo Osei Tutu I, Okomfo Anokye, it was revealed that the Ashantis could gain victory over the Denkyiras only after one of the chiefs had offered himself to be ritually sacrificed. Out of great patriotism and courage, Nana Tweneboa Kodua I, willingly stood up and told the Ashanti king that he was prepared to die to aid the newly formed Ashanti kingdom to gain their independence from the Denkyiras.

After the sacrificial death of Nana Tweneboa Kodua I, the Ashanti army gained victory over the Denkyiras, as was spiritually prophesied by Okomfo Anokye. His death, being considered as the spiritual strength for the liberation of the Ashanti kingdom from the Denkyiras, drove the King of Ashanti, Otumfuo Osei Tutu I to order that every year, a festival should be celebrated to remember this great deed of Nana Tweneboa Kodua I. More importantly, the festival is used to educate society members the need to demonstrate patriotism, courage, and selfless spirit required for the development of the Ghanaian society.

== Observance ==
In the eve of the festival, special propitiatory are performed on the blackened stools that are believed to repositories for the souls of all the deceased Ashanti kings kept in the Nkonyafie. Also, sacrifices are performed at particular spots in the Bomfobiri wildlife sanctuary and waterfalls where the Kumawu ancestors are believed to reside. These sacrifices are performed to inform the ancestors of the festival to be commemorated and more significantly to beckon for their spiritual guidance, assistance and presence for a successful festival observance. After the pacification and propitiatory rites to the ancestors are performed, a contest of bravery is held at the chief's palace or at any designated area where the festival durbar is held. A big cow is slaughtered. The dead cow is placed in an open arena where the festival durbar is being held amidst thousand of Kumawu residents, people from neighbouring Ashanti towns and villages as well as visitors. A path is created that leads to where the slaughtered cow lies where courageous individuals are made to cut a piece of the animal and run with it to a designated spot amidst several beatings from the crowd holding whips. If an individual is able to cut a part of the slaughtered cow and is able to send it to the designated spot despite the beatings, he is judged as courageous and brave. He takes possession of the cut cow meat and is awarded by the Kumawu chief.

Other contests such as food contests, dancing and singing competitions, beauty pageant as well as environmental cleansing and tree planting activities are carried out during the festival commemoration.
