= Military of the Asante Empire =

Armed forces of the Asante Empire

Asante army
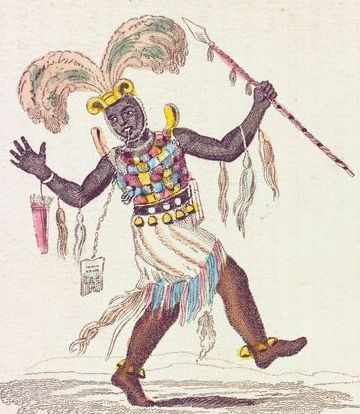
- Asante Military Field Marshal c. 1819, by Thomas E. Bowdich.
- Leader: Asantehene (commander-in-chief)
- Headquarters: Kumasi
- Active regions: Gold Coast, Ivory Coast, Togo, Dahomey
- Size: capable of 200,000 men.
- Part of: Asante Empire (Ashanti)
- Wars: Ashanti–Fante War, the Anglo-Ashanti wars

The military of the Asante Empire first came into formation around the 17th century AD in response to subjugation by the Denkyira Kingdom. It served as the main armed forces of the empire until it was dissolved when the Asante became a British crown colony in 1901. In 1701, King Osei Kofi Tutu I won Asante independence from Denkyira at the Battle of Feyiase and carried out an expansionist policy.

The Asante army prior to the 18th century used predominantly bows with poisoned arrows, swords, spears and javelins. King Osei Tutu I instituted reforms in the army such as the adoption of military tactics used by other Akan kingdoms. Through trade with Europeans at the coast, the Asante acquired firearms and artillery. By the 19th century, the army was primarily equipped with muskets and rifles. Transportation across water bodies was achieved through the use of canoes. The army was also accompanied by carpenters and blacksmiths. Cavalry was not adopted alongside the Asante infantry. In order to mobilize personnel for the army, volunteers and contingents from tributaries were supplemented with a core of professional soldiers. The Asante developed various tactics such as encirclement and pincer movement.

== History ==
The Asante originally centered on clans which were headed by a paramount chief or Amanhene. The clans did not have a standing and organized army that operated on a centralized chain of command. The Asante clans became tributaries of another Akan state, Denkyira who exerted influence over much of the region. In the mid-17th century the Oyoko, an Asante clan led by Chief Nana Oti Akenten, is believed to have been the first to have achieved military unification among the clans.

=== War of Independence ===
In the 1670s the head of the Oyoko clan and successor to Nana Akenten, Osei Kofi Tutu I, began another rapid consolidation of Akan clans. He sought cooperation via diplomacy and warfare. Osei Tutu I and his chief advisor, Okomfo Anokye led a coalition of Asante city-states against Denkyira. The coalition defeated Denkyira at the Battle of Feyiase in 1701 which marked the rise of the Asante state.

=== Reforms under Osei Tutu I ===
Osei Tutu centralized the loose confederation of Akan states in order to organize and professionalize the military. He also expanded the powers of the Judiciary system within the Centralized government. Eventually, the loose confederation of small city-states unified as a kingdom and grew into an empire. Newly conquered areas had the option to either join the Asante Empire or become tributary states.

Osei Tutu placed strong emphasis on the military organization of the Akan Union states prior to the war with Denkyira. He adopted the military organization of Asante allies, Akwamu, and honed the Union army into an effective fighting unit. Osei Tutu improved the battle strategy of the union army through the introduction of the pincer formation whereby soldiers attacked from the left, right and rear. This formation was later adopted by several other kingdoms in the Gold Coast. The Asante military declined in 1901 after the empire was defeated by the British following the War of the Golden Stool.

== Organization ==
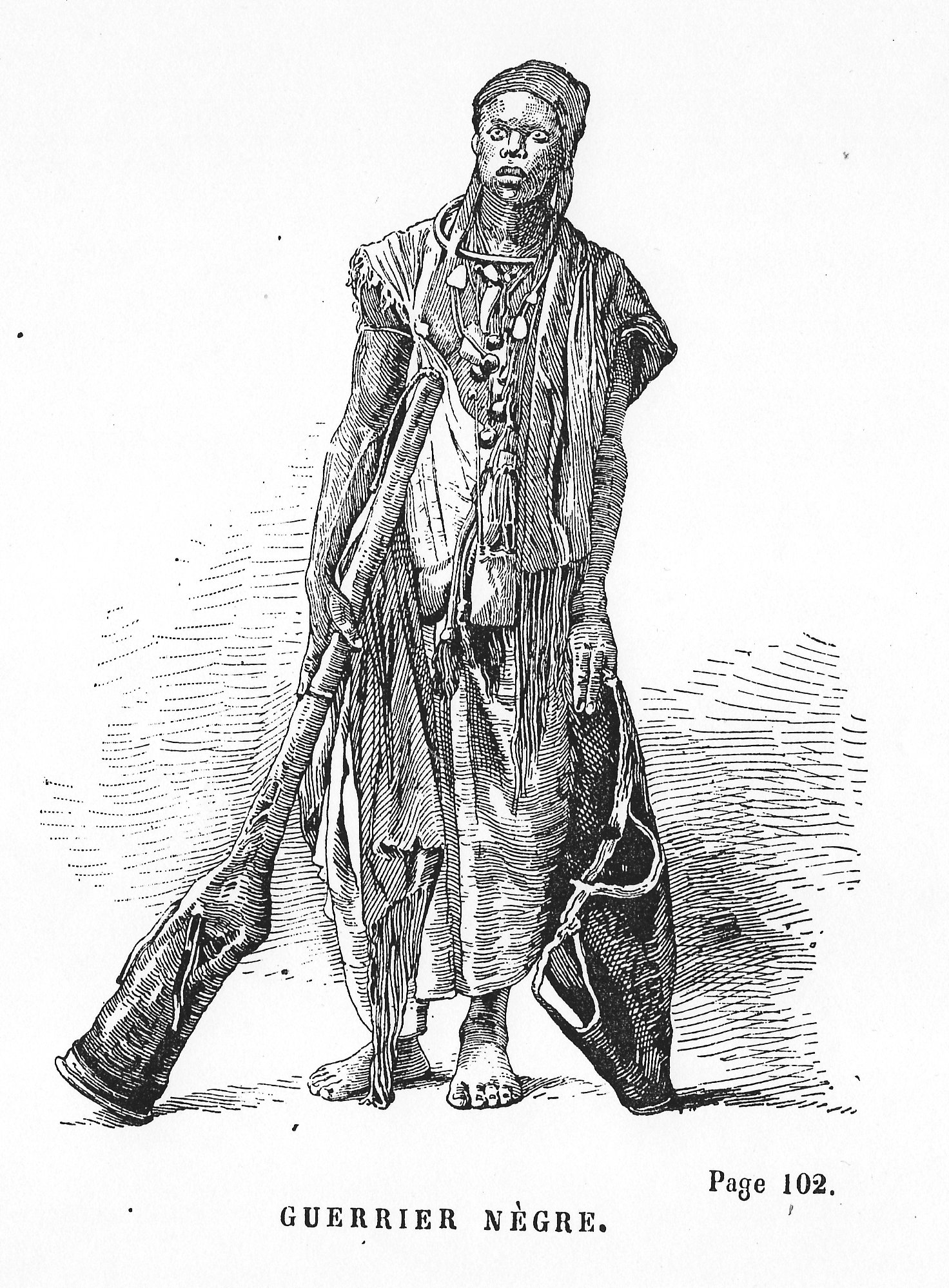
Asante foot soldier

The Asantehene was the commander-in-chief of the Asante military. A war-tax was paid by all Asante citizens over the age of 18 to cover the expenses of warfare. The army of the Asante Empire was organized into 6 parts. Each had various sub divisions. The organization of the Asante army was based on local Akan military systems such as the organization of the Akwamu army. The six parts of the Asante army were:

1. Scouts (akwansrafo)
2. Advance guard (twafo)
3. Main body (adonten)
4. Personal bodyguard (gyase)
5. Rear-guard (kyidom)
6. Two wings-left (benkum) and right (nifa). Each wing having two formations: right and right-half (nifa nnaase), left and left-half (benkum nnaase)

In battle, the army used advanced guard, main body, rear guard and right and left wings on the move. This organization enabled the Asante generals to maneuver their forces with flexibility. Reconnaissance and pursuit operations were carried out by the scouts. The scouts were made up of professional hunters who used their skill of marksmanship to snipe at advancing enemy forces in response to detection by the enemy. This was executed often from a perch high in trees. In order to draw the enemy's force and compel them to reveal their positions in the jungle foliage, the scouts carried long wooden sticks with hooks on the end which they used to shake trees as if someone were in them. Scouts were precluded from an involvement in prolonged fighting. After exchanging a few shots with the enemy, they withdrew through the next wave of troops which was the advanced guards. The advanced guard could also serve as initial storm troops or bait troops to get the enemy to reveal their position and strength. The gyase or personal guards protected the king or high ranking nobles on the battlefield. The rear guard however, might function for pursuit or as a reserve echelon. The two wings aided in the tactics of the Asante during battle through the encirclement of the opposing force or striking at the rear.

Individualized acts of daring were encouraged, such as rushing out into the open to behead dead or wounded enemies. A tally of these trophies was presented to the commanding general after the end of the engagement. Soldiers who tried to flee from battle were kept in check by sword-bearers who whipped them with heavy swords. Asante soldiers had to memorize the following saying: "If I go forward, I die; if I flee, I die. Better to go forward and die in the mouth of battle."

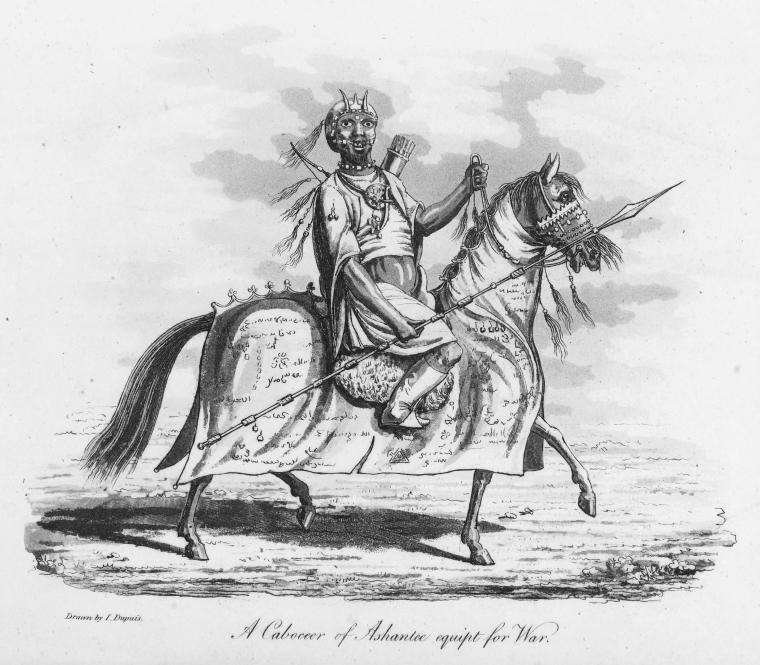
Caboceer (Chief) of Asante equipped for war. Image was engraved in the early nineteenth century

The ankobia or special police functioned as special forces and bodyguards to the Asantehene. They served as a source of intelligence for suppressing rebellion. Horses were introduced into the state around the 18th century. Horses were recorded to have survived in Kumasi in contrast to the forest zone in the south due to the presence of the tsetse fly. Robert B. Edgerton writes that although Asante high-ranking officers rode horses with the hauteur of European officers, a cavalry was not developed for the Asante military. Thornton adds that the Asante captured and rode horses after a campaign against states up north in the 18th century. This attempt at forming a cavalry was ineffective which Thornton puts up as; "...though they can be hardly an effective cavalry and reportedly all were killed in one engagement." Canoes were used for troop transport across rivers. In 1873, British captain Brackenbury recorded an account by an Assin of Asante forces crossing the River Pra in two ferries of boats with 30 men per boats and four trips an hour. He estimated 12,000 men had crossed the river. In a feature seldom seen among African armies, the Asante also deployed units of medical personnel behind the main forces, who were tasked with caring for the wounded and removing the dead. A full time medical corps was established as a branch of the Asante army by the late 19th century.

=== Mobilization, recruitment and logistics ===
A small core of professional warriors was supplemented by peasant levies, volunteers and contingents from allied forces or tributary kingdoms. Grouped together under competent commanders such as Osei Tutu and Opoku Ware, such hosts began to expand the Asante empire in the 18th century on into the 19th, moving from deep inland to the edges of the Atlantic. One British source in 1820 estimated that the Asante could field into battle a potential 80,000 troops, and of these, 40,000 could in theory, be outfitted with muskets or blunder-busses.

Slaves marched behind the main body of the army, carrying supplies on their head. The army was also accompanied by carpenters responsible for building shelters, blacksmiths to repair weapons and sutlers to sell food and drink. Some wives followed their husbands to war where they cooked for them at camp and provided water during battle. For Thornton, the Great Roads played a role in Asante warfare. These roads allowed for the rapid deployment of the army and they negated the tactics of Asante's opponents who took advantage of the forest in their campaigns against the state.

== Equipment ==
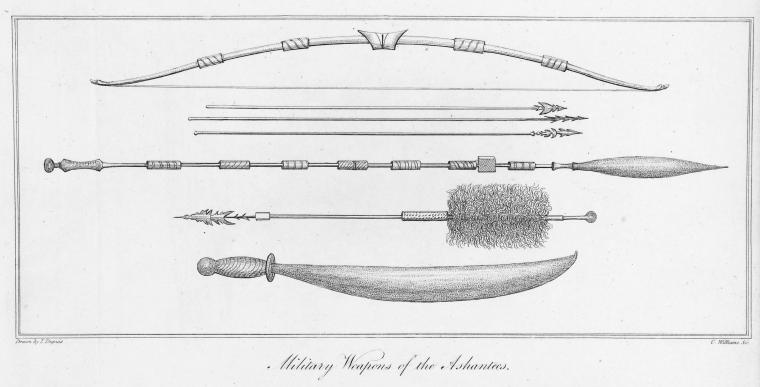
"Weapons of the Ashanti" engraved in 1824 by James Wyld I

=== Arms ===
Before the unification of the Asante clans as one kingdom and empire, the bow, shield and arrow were the weapon of choice. After the 1701 conquest of Denkyira, Osei Tutu I established trade contacts with European merchants at the coast through which he enabled the supply of firearms. The Asante became familiar with firearms in the 18th century. Majority of the Asante troops were armed with a variety of guns and this includes the standard European trade musket; Long Dane. Richards argues on Asante's success with long-barrelled muskets which he states to have brought a change in warfare around the hinterland of the Gold Coast in the 1740s. Around 1742, the Asante army defeated the Akyem with Dutch muskets whose barrels were 5–6 feet long in comparison with Akyem's short barrels 3–4 feel long. This victory led to the large demand for such kind of muskets in the region. Although most Asante firearms were imported, efforts were made to manufacture guns locally, with limited success. These efforts reportedly produced the humu gun, so called for its unusually large barrel. Due to difficulties in obtaining iron ore, the barrel was instead made from brass.

A handful of the Asante had modern breechloading British Snider–Enfield rifles. British reports from 1878 to 1881, estimated that the Asante had a total of 1000–5000 modern rifles. In addition, they employed 1000 well-worn French smoothbore muskets originally used in 1814 at the battle of Waterloo. However, Asante guns were obsolete compared to first rank European firearms. General Nkwanta, head of the Asante army's general council is reported to have done a detailed assessment of new breech-loading European firearms in 1872–73 and was alarmed by the obsolescence of Asante muskets in comparison to their European counterparts. Good quality powder was in short supply. Most of the gunmen did not use wadding to compact the powder down into the barrels but simply dumped in it while adding a variety of lead slugs, nails, bits of metal or even stones. This made an impressive pyrotechnic display but greatly limited the range of firearms.

Available guns as well as pouches for ammunition were carefully protected with leopard or leather skin covers. Soldiers carried thirty to forty gunpowder charges within reach, which was individually packed in small wooden boxes for quick loading. The buckskin belt worn by the soldiers provided alternate weapons such as several types of knives and machete.

=== Artillery ===
Asante king, Kwaku Dua signed a military agreement which involved the yearly supply of Asante troops to the Royal Netherlands East Indies Army in exchange for Dutch artillery pieces. The Dutch suppliers provided the Asante king with immobile cannons on ships rather than field carriages. There existed in Kumasi, a Cannon-square that housed a trophy of Dutch Cannons. They were captured from Denkyira after Asante emerged victorious at the Battle of Feyiase.

=== Attire ===
Most fighters wore a batakari which was made out of materials including charms and amulets originally from Dagbon. The Asante believed these charms made them invulnerable. Bowdich described the ordinary soldier in the 19th century as;

Their caps were of the skin of pangolin and leopard, the tails hanging down behind; their cartouch belts (composed of small gourds which hold the charges, and covered with leopard or pig's skin) were embossed with red shells, and small brass bells thickly hung to them; on their hips and shoulders was a cluster of knives; iron chains and collars dignified the most daring, who were prouder of them than of gold; their muskets had rests affixed of leopard's skin, and the locks a covering of the same; the sides of their faces were curiously painted in long white streaks and their arms also striped, having the appearance of an armour....

— Bowdich.

He also described the appearance of the war captain in 1817 as follows;

The dress of the captains was a war cap, with gilded ram horns projecting in front, the sides extended beyond all proportion by immense plumes of eagle feathers, and fastened under the chin with bands of cowries. Their vest was of red cloth, covered with fetishes and saphies in gold and silver; and embroidered cases of almost every colour, which flapped against their bodies as they moved, intermixed with small brass bells, the horns and tails of animals, shells and knives; long leopard tails hung down their backs, over a small bow covered with fetishes. They wore loose cotton trousers, with immense boots of dull red leather, coming half way up the thigh, and fastened by small chains to their cartouch or waist belts; these were also ornamented with bells, horse tails, strings of amulets, and innumerable shreds of leather; a small quiver of poisoned arrows hung from their right wrist, and they held a long iron chain between their teeth, with a scrap of Moorish writing affixed to the end of it. A small spear was in their left hands, covered with red cloth and silk tassels; their black countenances heightened the effect of this attire, and completed a figure scarcely human....

— Bowdich.

Scholar Manu-Osafo argues that the myth over the invulnerability of the batakari to repel bullets was fueled by the poor accuracy of firearms during that period. In addition, the leather pouches and metal cases of the attire presented the war dress to be heavy, dense and impenetrable. Edgerton on the other hand, states that the Asante army did not have a single formal uniform for warfare as its forces dressed distinctively.

== Battle tactics ==
The Asante tactical system was decentralized in order to suit the thick forest terrain of West Africa. The growth of jungles often hindered large scale clashes involving thousands of soldiers in the open. Asante tactical methods involved smaller sub-units, constant movement, ambushes, and more dispersed strikes and counter-attacks. In one unusual incident in 1741 however, the armies of Asante and Akyem agreed to schedule a battle and jointly assigned some 10,000 men to cut down trees to make space for a full scale clash. The Asante won this encounter.

A British commentary in 1844 stated that Asante tactics involved cutting a number of footpaths in the bush in order to approach and encircle the enemy force. The Asante army formed in line and attacked the enemy upon reaching the initial jump-off point. Other British accounts describe the use of converging columns by the Asante army whereby several marching parallel columns joined into one general strike force, maneuvering before combat. The converging column strategy was used by Napoleon Bonaparte in the Napoleonic Wars as well as the British in their war with the Asante around 1873–4. The 'march divided, fight together' was the original raison d'etre of the division. These standardized tactics had often yielded the Asante victory. In battle, the Asante troops carried their guns exactly at the same angle, before they turned towards the enemy and fired volleys on command. Scouts screened the army of the enemy as it marched in its columns, then withdrew as the enemy became close. At the beginning of combat, the advance guard moved up in 2 or 3 long lines, discharged its muskets and paused to reload. The second line would then advance to fire and reload. A third rear line would then repeat the advance – fire-reload cycle. This "rolling fire" tactic was repeated until the advance halted. Flanking maneuvers also formed part of Asante tactics. Iliffe and Smith have commented that some Asante forces could fire from the shoulder. In 1820, Joseph Dupuis wrote that the Asante were "trained to firing with celerity as we ourselves use the musquet."

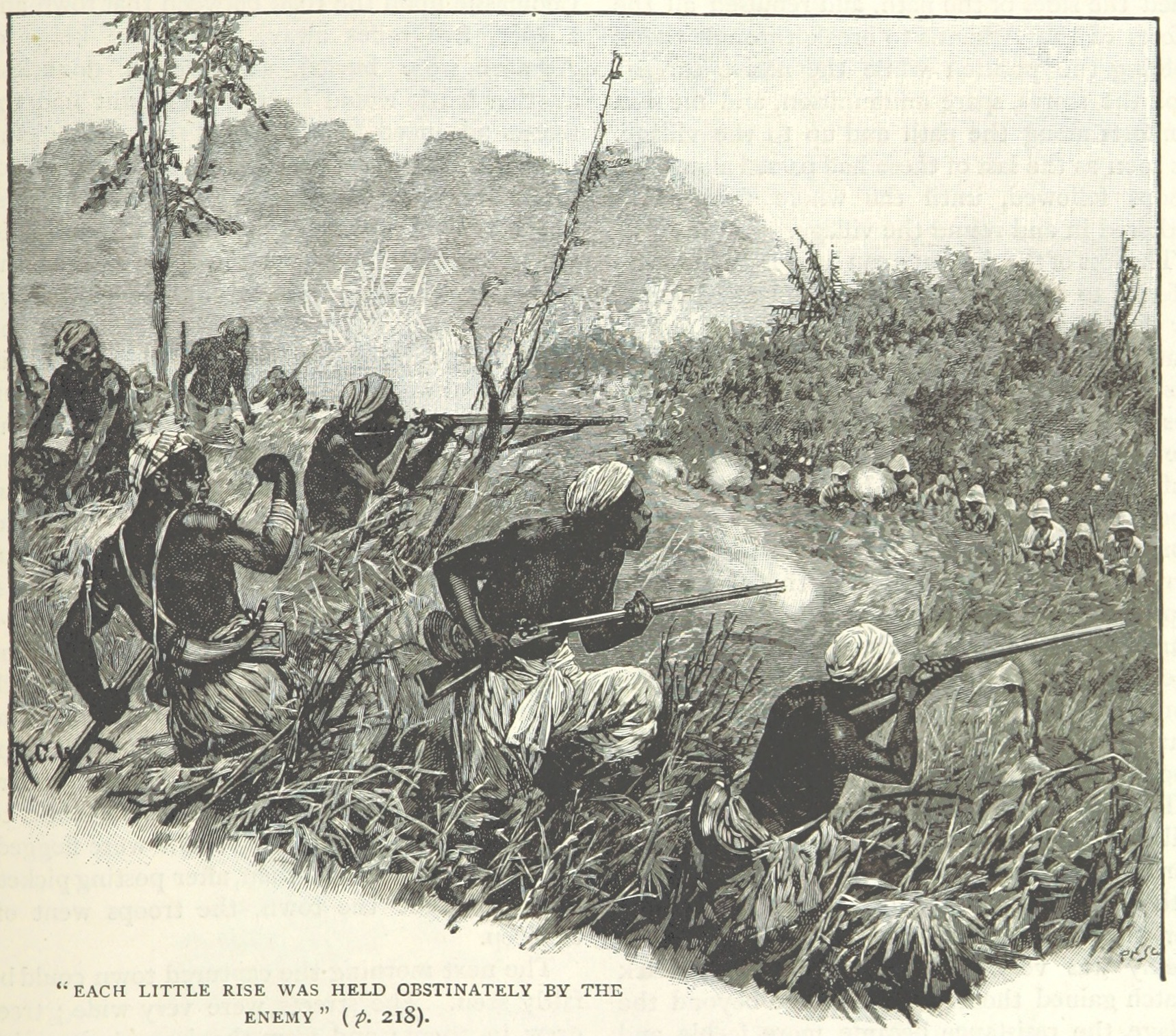
Scene from Third Anglo-Asante War 1874

The Asante also used hammer and anvil tactics in wars such as the third Anglo-Ashanti war. In 1874 a strong British force under Sir Garnet Wolseley, armed with modern rifles and artillery, invaded the territory of the Asante Empire. The Asante did not confront the invaders immediately, and made no major effort to interdict their long, vulnerable lines of communication through the jungle terrain. Their plan appeared to be to draw the British deep into their territory, against a strong defensive anvil centred at the town of Amoaful. Here the British would be tied down, while maneuvering wing elements circled to the rear, trapping and cutting them off. Some historians (Farwell 2001) note that this was approach was a traditional Asante battle strategy, and was common in some African armies as well. At the village of Amoaful, the Asante succeeded in luring their opponents forward, but could not make any headway against the modern firepower of the British forces, which laid down a barrage of fire to accompany an advance of infantry in squares. This artillery fire took a heavy toll on the Asante, but they left a central blocking force in place around the village, while unleashing a large flanking attack on the left, that almost enveloped the British line and successfully broke into some of the infantry squares. Asante weaponry however, was poor compared to the modern British guns. As one participant noted:

"The Ashantees stood admirably, and kept up one of the heaviest fires I ever was under. While opposing our attack with immediately superior numbers, they kept enveloping our left with a constant series of well-directed flank attacks."

Wolesey had anticipated the Asante "horseshoe" formations, and had strengthened the British flanks with the best units and reinforced firepower. He was able to shift this firepower to threatened sectors to stymie enemy maneuvers, defeating their hammer and anvil elements and forcing his opponents to retreat. One British combat post-mortem pays tribute to the slain Asante commander for his tactical leadership and use of terrain:

"The great Chief Amanquatia was among the killed. Admirable skill was shown in the position selected by Amanquatia, and the determination and generalship he displayed in the defence fully bore out his great reputation as an able tactician and gallant soldier."

=== Siege and engineering ===
In one siege of a British Fort during the Anglo-Ashanti wars, the Asante sniped at the defenders, cut the telegraph wires as a means of curbing communication, blocked food supplies, and attacked relief columns. The Asante Empire built powerful log stockades at key points. This was employed in later wars against the British to block British advances. Some of these fortifications were over a hundred yard long, with heavy parallel tree trunks. They were impervious to destruction by artillery fire. Behind these stockades, numerous Asante soldiers were mobilized to check enemy movement. While formidable in construction, many of these strongpoints failed because Asante guns, gunpowder and bullets provided little sustained killing power in defense. British troops overcame or bypassed the stockades by mounting bayonet charges, after laying down some covering fire.

Brass barrel blunderbuss were produced in some states in the Gold Coast including the Asante Empire around the eighteenth and nineteenth centuries. Various accounts indicate that Asante blacksmiths were not only able to repair firearms, but that barrels, locks and stocks were on occasion remade. Besides the local production of guns, gunpowder may have been prepared in Asante.

== See also ==
- African military systems to 1800
- African military systems (1800–1900)
- African military systems after 1900
- Anglo-Ashanti wars
- Ashanti–Fante War
- Ga-Fante War
- Impi
- Katamanso War
- Political systems of the Asante Empire

== Bibliography ==
- Basil, Davidson African Civilization Revisited, Africa World Press: 1991 ISBN 9780865431232
- Collins, Robert O.; Burns, James M. (2007). A History of Sub-Saharan Africa. Cambridge University Press. ISBN 9780521867467.
- C. Henry, Brackenbury The Ashanti War (1874) Volume 1: A Narrative, Andrews UK Limited: 2012 ISBN 9781781508992
- Edgerton, Robert B. (2010). The Fall of the Asante Empire: The Hundred-Year War For Africa's Gold Coast. Simon & Schuster. ISBN 9781451603736.
- Iliffe, John (2005). Honour in African History. Cambridge University Press. ISBN 9780521546850.
- Ivor Wilks (1989). Asante in the Nineteenth Century: The Structure and Evolution of a Political Order. CUP Archive. ISBN 9780521379946 – via Books.google.com.
- Raugh, Harold E. (2004). The Victorians at War, 1815-1914: An Encyclopedia of British Military History. ABC-Clio. ISBN 9781576079256.
- Thornton, John K. (1999). Warfare in Atlantic Africa, 1500-1800. Routledge. ISBN 9781135365844.
- Vandervort, Bruce (2006). Wars of Imperial Conquest in Africa: 1830–1914. Routledge. ISBN 9781135364656.
