= Abankeseso =

1690s capital of Denkyira state (current day Ghana)

- Location within Ghana
- 6°17′N 1°51′W
- Cultures: Denkyira
- Region: Ashanti Region

History
- Abandoned: 1824

Abankeseso, also known as Ntibanso, was the capital of the state of Denkyira from the early 17th century to 1701.

In 1692 Dutch, English and Brandenburger traders traveled to Abankeseso and set up trading relations with the Denkyirahene Boamponsem. In 1701, after Denkyira's defeat at the Battle of Feyiase, Abankeseso was sacked. The city was permanently abandoned after Denkyira rebelled against Asante in 1823, and the survivors fled south to Dunkwa and Jukwa.

== Sources ==
- Gordon, J. (1953). "Some Oral Traditions of Denkyira". Transactions of the Gold Coast & Togoland Historical Society. 1 (3): 27–33.
- McCaskie, T. C. (2007). "Denkyira in the Making of Asante c. 1660–1720". The Journal of African History. 48 (1): 1–25.
