= List of rulers of the Akan state of Denkyira =

This is a list of rulers of the Akan state of Denkyira, formerly known as Agona. Their title was Denkyirahene. Dates in italics indicate de facto continuation of office.

Tenure	Incumbent	Notes
Agona
1500	Foundation of Agona state
Agonahenes (rulers)
1588 to 1620	Mumunumfi, Agonahene	Becoming Denkyirahene
Denkyira	State renamed
Denkyirahene (rulers)
1620 to 1624	Mumunumfi Denkyirahene	Hitherto Agonahene
1624 to 1637	Werempe Ampem Denkyirahene||
1637 to 1695	Boa Amponsem I, Denkyirahene
1695 to 1701	Ntim Gyakari, Denkyirahene
1701	Defeated by Asanteman, becoming tributary
1701 to 1702	Boado Ahafo Berempon, Denkyirahene
1702 to 1712	Kyei Akobeng, Denkyirahene
1712 to 1720	Amoako Atta Panyin, Denkyirahene
1720 to 1725	Gyan Badu, Denkyirahene
1725 to 1770	Amoako Atta Kuma, Denkyirahene
1770 to 1793	Amoako Atta Yiadom, Denkyirahene	♀
1793 to 1813	Owusu Bori I, Denkyirahene
1813 to 1851	Kwadwo Tibu I, Denkyirahene
1851 to 1859	Kwakye Fram, Denkyirahene
1859 to 1869	Kwesi Kyei I, Denkyirahene
1870 to 1875	Boa Amponsem II, Denkyirahene
1875 to 1910	Nkwantabisa I, Denkyirahene
1910 to 1912	Kwesi Kyei II, Denkyirahene
1912 to 1918	Nkwantabisa II, Denkyirahene
1919 to 1930	Kwadwo Tibu II, Denkyirahene
1931 to 1941	Nkwantabisa III, Denkyirahene
1942 to 1953	Owusu Bori II, Denkyirahene
ante/c.May 1954 to post/c. 1954	Nana Kojo Odei, Regent
1955 to 2016	Ɔdɛɛfoɔ Boa Amponsem III, Denkyirahene
2016 to 2025	Vacant	Kingdom ruled by the Queen of Denkyira - Nana Ama Ayensua Saara III
2025 to Present	Ɔdɛɛfoɔ Boa Amponsem IV, Denkyirahene

== See also ==
- Ghana
- Gold Coast
- Lists of incumbents
