= Tweneboa Kodua =

Ghanaian chief

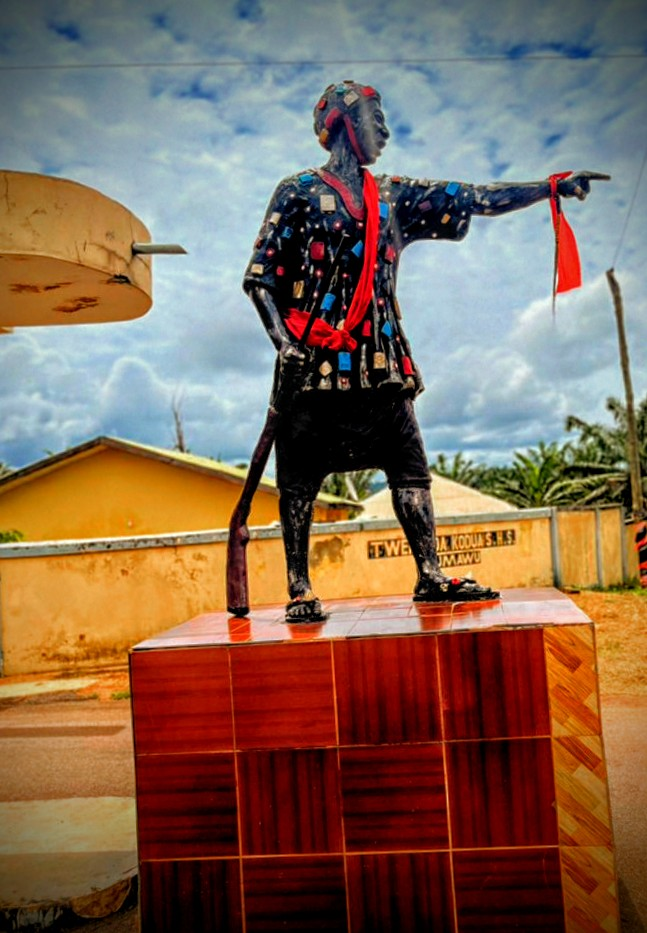
STATUE OF NANA TWENEBOA KODUA I

Nana Tweneboa Kodua was the paramount chief of Kumawu who sacrificed his life for the victory of the Asantes. He was asked by Komfo Anokye to do that to ensure the Asante Kingdom's freedom against the Denkyiras in the War of Independence.

The Asantes went to war against the king of Denkyiras called Ntim Gyakari after he made some demands which provoked them. There were three volunteers who sacrificed their lives for the victory of the Asante nation and Tweneboa Kodua was one of them. He was asked to lead the marching soldiers and was forbidden to shoot even though he was armed. He was therefore killed. He requested that no one from his state should ever be used as a sacrifice in any form after he volunteered.

Ntim Gyakari was captured at Feyiase and was beheaded. Denkyira then became subject to the Asante Kingdom.
