= Amponsem =

Amponsem is a surname. Notable people with the surname include:

- Boa Amponsem I (or Boamponsem) (died 1694), omanhene
  - Odeefuo Boa Amponsem III (born 1932), omanhene
- Kwabena Boa-Amponsem known as Koo Nimo (born 1934), Ghanaian folk musician
