= Osei Kofi Tutu I =

Monarch of the Kingdom of Asante

Osei Tutu I
- King Asantehene of the Kingdom of Asante; Kumasehene of Kumase

King of Ashanti
- Reign: c. 1680/c. 1695 – 1701; late 1701 – c. 1717
- Coronation: c. 1695; c. 1701
- Predecessor: Nana Obiri Yeboa (maternal uncle)
- Successor: Opoku Ware I (grand-nephew)
- Born: c. 1660; Kokofu Anyinam
- Died: 1717 (aged 56–57); Pra River
Names
- Otumfuo Nana Osei Kofi Tutu Opemsoo
- House: House of Oyoko Abohyen Dynasty
- Father: Owusu Panyin
- Mother: Maanu Kotosii

Osei Kofi Tutu I (c. 1660 – c. 1717) was one of the founders of the Asante Empire, assisted by Okomfo Anokye, his Chief Priest. He led an alliance of Asante states against Denkyira, the regional hegemon, defeating them at the 1701 Battle of Feyiase. He ruled the Kwaman State between c.1680 and 1701 and the Ashanti Empire from 1701 to 1717. As Asantehene, he incorporated a number of Akan states into the growing empire, and established the institutions of government that underpinned the state for nearly 200 years.

== Early life ==
=== Birth ===
Osei Kofi Tutu Opemsoo was born c. 1660 in the town of Kokofu Anyinam, in the Ashanti Region of modern-day Ghana. His father was Owusu Panyin, an Akan noble from Nyameani. His mother, Maanu Kotosii, was the sister of the Omanhene of Kwaaman Oti Akenten and his successor Obiri Yeboa.

It is said that Osei Tutu's mother was barren for many years, so her brother Obiri Yeboa sent her to a powerful and famous shrine called Otutu in Akuapem to obtain a blessing. When Kotosii gave birth to a child, she named him Tutu, after the shrine. Due to the matrilineal succession the Akan practised, Osei Tutu was the heir to the Kwaaman throne.

=== Time In The Denkyira Court ===
Little is known about the childhood of Osei Tutu, and most of what is known and told about his life dates from when he reached the age of sixteen, the age when Akan boys were now seen as men. His uncle Oti Akenten sent him to Abankeseso, the capital of Denkyiraman. This was not unusual, as the Denkyira had a long-standing practice of holding the heirs to their subordinate kings as hostages, but also providing the young men the opportunity to learn statecraft and the latest military techniques. As part of his service, he was made a shield-bearer to the Denkyirahene. He distinguished himself in a war against the Sehwi people, but later angered Boamponsem the king when he refused to hand it over to him.

=== Scandal and flight to Akwamu ===
According to oral histories, Osei Tutu was a very handsome young man. He began an adulterous relationship with the sister or niece of the Denkyirahene, Princess (Ohene nuabaa) Akobena Abensua. In other versions of the story, the relationship is with the queen of Nkawie, Adoma Akosua. It became worse as the princess became pregnant, and rumors spread of who the father actually was. Fearing possible execution he fled east to Akwamu.

=== Time in Akwamu ===
Arriving at the Akwamu court of Ansa Saseraku I in Akwamufie, he was welcomed, either due to his personal beauty, or as a diplomatic slight against Denkyira. Here Osei Tutu learned about the military organization of the Akwamu, who possessed the most advanced army of any Akan state, with a powerful contingent of musketmen.

It is unclear at what specific time period Osei Tutu met Okomfo Anokye. It may have been in Denkyira with Anokye later joining Osei Tutu in Kwaman, or they may have met in Akwamu. However, by the time Osei Tutu left Akwamu, the two had certainly met and become friends.

=== Return to Kwaaman ===
After a few years in Akwamu, in c. 1677 Osei Tutu received news that his uncle, Obiri Yeboa, had been killed during a campaign against Dormaa. A committee of Kwaman nobles invited him to return home to take the stool. In order to accompany have him back to Kwaaman, Ansa Sasraku sent 300 of his best Akwamu warriors to accompany him, along with Akomfo Onokye. When the soldiers, Osei Tutu and Okomfo Anokye arrived at Kwaaman, the warriors settled among them and later became citizens of Asafo, while Osei Tutu mourned the death of his uncle, and then was enstooled as Osei Tutu I of Kwaaman.

== As Kwamanhene ==
The new Kwamanhene set about making significant reforms to his little kingdom, looking to his powerful neighbors in Denkyira and Akwamu for inspiration. The objective was to create a more powerful state with an efficient and meritocratic military, answerable to the monarch rather than divided into clan or ethnic groups.

=== Reforms ===
Osei Tutu set up various new stools to strengthen the royal administration. The Afotosanfoɔ was made responsible for the treasury and for providing funds for the royal household. The Asokwa Batahene stool managed the guilds, the Adwumfuohene the goldsmiths, and the Sanaa managed finances. The Gyase were founded as servants and administrators of the royal household.

Osei Tutu also dramatically overhauled the military structure of Kwaman, modeling his reforms on the military organization of Denkyira. He created new seven military divisions, divorced from pre-existing clan identities. These were commanded by officers occupying new stools: the captains of the advance guard (twifo), the main guard (adonten), the king's servants (gyase), the rear guard (kyidom), the left guard (benkum), the right guard (nifa), and the second in command (akwamuhene). Osei Tutu now commanded a reformed army built around a core of Akwamu musketmen (the only warriors in the immediate region with firearms at the time), with a new structure permitting more hierarchical command and unity between the Oyoko clans.

=== Expansion ===
With these new reforms in place, Osei Tutu was well positioned to expand his state and avenge his uncle. After three years of preparation, he marched against Dormaa and decisively defeated them. Throughout the 1680s, he also integrated Tafo, Kaase, Offinso, Sehwi and Anakrom, expanding his personal power relative to his Oyoko relatives in the surrounding 'Amantoo' communities - Kokofu, Nsuta, Bekwai, Juaben, as well as Mampong. Osei Tutu's strict policy was to extend the benefits of citizenship to all, regardless of their origin - a key element of the later Asante Constitution.

Denkyira's oppressive rule and monopolization of trade with the coast had created widespread dissent and discontent among their tributaries. By the mid 1690s Kwaman was well positioned to lead a coalition in revolt against their overlord. Kwaman's prodigious growth in power did not go unnoticed in Abakeseso, however.

== Unifying Asante ==
The Kwaman conquest of Dormaa in particular was an affront to Denkyirahene Ntim Gyakari, since both of the warring states were nominally tributaries of Denkyira. Another account that is given is that Osei Tutu had given protection to Oduro Agyensamoo of Assin, a man wanted in Abankeseso for questioning about the circumstances of Denkyirahene Boamponsem's death. Recognizing Osei Tutu's actions as a direct challenge to his power, Gyakari sent an embassy to Kwaman. His demands included:

- A large basin full of gold
- Beaded necklaces, traditionally the symbols of a wife's submission to her husband
- One of Osei Tutu's sons or nephews as a hostage
- That Osei Tutu and each of his commanders send one of their wives to Abankeseso

Whether the Asante Constitution was established in anticipation of a revolt against Denkyira, in direct response to the Denkyirahene's ultimatum, or after the war is not known for sure, but the basic events are well-established and the ultimate outcome was the same. The assembled Oyoko chiefs resoundingly rejected these insulting terms, filling the brass basin with stones rather than gold. Osei Tutu seized this moment and the impending threat of Denkyira's revenge to formally unite the Amantoo clans unders his leadership. He announced that he had been tasked by Onyeame the sky god with a great mission: to unite Asante. According to legend Anokye, in the presence of a huge multitude brought down from the sky, in a black cloud, and amid rumblings, and in air thick with white dust, a wooden stool three supports partly covered with gold. It alighted slowly upon Osei Tutu’s knees. This stool contained the sunsum (soul or spirit) of the Ashanti nation, and their power, health, bravery, and welfare were enshrined within it. Osei Tutu thus became the Asantehene, and the heads of the Amantoo states were given an important role in his ruling council.

Osei Tutu founded a new capital for the emergent Asante Confederation, the city of Kumasi, named after the kum tree that Tutu sat under while negotiating the terms and new laws for the land. He also established the Odwira festival, which celebrated the yam harvest while bringing all major political players to Kumasi to pay homage to the Asantehene, resolve disputes, and enforce unity within the new Asante confederacy. The strength of the new alliance was immediately put to the test.

== War with Denkyira ==
=== Denkyiran Defections ===
Osei Tutu and Anokye engaged in a propaganda campaign, trying to get Denkyrian commanders to defect. Anokye claimed that his magic powers would convince half of the Denkyiran force to switch sides. It is said that the first town that changed allegiance from Ntim Gyakari to Osei Tutu was the Abooso people. Abooso was a town that lay in the vicinity of Adanse Akrokeri whose inhabitants were called Bontwumafo - the red clay people. After having provoked the Denkyirahene's wrath during the conquest of Adanse, they were condemned to provide human sacrifices whenever a member of the royal family died. They were called the red clay people as when they were sacrificed, their blood was mixed with clay to paint the body of the deceased. When Ntim Gyakari's mother, Akobena Abensua, fell mortally ill, the Bontwumafo and the inhabitants of the surrounding towns fled in great numbers and sought refuge with Osei Tutu at Kumasi. They were welcomed and given land, and their leaders were given important positions within the Asante federation.

When it was clear that the Bontwumafo were welcomed by Osei Tutu, many others from Denkyira followed. The Anwianwia and Asabi groups, fleeing Gyakari's cruel rule, were resettled in Ahafo. The Awu Dawu, personal servants of the Denkyirahene, defected and were placed under the command of Amankwatia, another renegade Denkyiran who was now a senior general with the titles of Kontihene and Bantamahene. Others of Ntim Gyakari's household servants who also defected were the brothers Akwadan and Nuamoa, the chief hornblowers of the Denkyirahene. They came to Kumase with their golden horns and their large followers. They were resettled at Akuropon and later brought into Kumasi when Osei Tutu created the Asokwa stool for them so that they might act as his traders as well as his hornblowers. Similarly, the Denkyirahene's head drummer also fled to Osei Tutu with his sister and 1000 followers. Osei Tutu appointed him as Nkukuwafohene. Numerous other groups and whole towns switched sides.

Aboabo, a town near the Oda River, hosted the Denkyirahene's shield-bearers (Akyamfuo). A conflict arose between the Akyamfuo and the villagers, and the villagers killed some of the shield-bearers. Ntim Gyakari was incensed and summoned the villagers to appear before him. The village chief demanded relief, saying that the hene's servants were ruffians who stole from the people. The king ordered him killed forthwith together with all his family. The villagers and the inhabitants of the towns close to Aboabo escaped to Asante. Some decided to return to their home and beg the Denkyriahene to forgive them, but were executed.

The most important of all those who migrated were the ‘Inkwayulaes or Nkawie people, whose defection crippled royal authority in northern Denkyira. Nkawie, 20 miles north of Abankeseso, was the second most important town in the Denkyira Empire. It was ruled by a lineage that occupied a Stool from which you become the Denkyirahene. Its female stool was also occupied by Denkyirahene’s ‘nieces’, women who were eligible to become the Queenmother of Denkyira. In 1694, after the death of King Boa Amponsem I, Ntim Gyakari had won out over Asenso Kufuor in the succession dispute. Ntim Gyakari kept Asenso Kufuor and his sister Adoma in Abankeseso under his personal surveillance. Still, Asenso Kufuor decided to side with Osei Tutu and escaped to Kwaaman. As a royal eligible to become Denkyirahene and Gyakari's most powerful vassal, he came with all his subordinate chiefs together with guns and gold.

=== Conflict ===
By November 1698, open conflict had broken out. The Wassa, Twifo, and Aowin had joined Asante and closed off Denkyiran access to arms and ammunition from the European trading posts on their stretch of coast. Denkyira, on the other hand, was supported by the Dutch and the ruler of Dampong. The Akyem, allied with Denkyira, attacked the Asante allies in Akwamu, fighting to a stalemate in 1699.

The Denkyiran forces found initial success. At the battles of Adunku, Aputuogya, and Abuontem, Ntim Gyakari managed to force Asante forces back. A mile north of Aputuogya he encountered Osei Tutu's main force deployed at Feyiase, where the Asante won a crushing victory.

Among those captured or, in some interpretations, killed was Ntim Gyakari. The Dwaben Asafo (the Dwaben part of the Amantoo army headed by the Dwabenhene himself) found Gyakari playing golden oware with his wife, unaware of what was happening on the battlefield. There are many ways stated for how Ntim died. One source says that after him trying to resist his capture, in which the Dwabenhene himself attacked and subdued Gyakari, they captured him and brought him to Osei Tutu. Gyakari was tried, convicted, and executed in Feyiase. Other sources state that Adakwayiadom, the Dwaben commander of the Asante right wing, beheaded Ntim on the spot. The Asante forces also captured six Dutch cannons that were taken back to Kumasi as trophies.

=== Aftermath ===
After their defeat at Feyiase, the remanents of the Denkyiran army fled south of the Ofin River. The Asante army thoroughly sacked Abankeseso for 15 days, taking the Denkyirahene's great stores of gold back to Kumasi. He nominated Boadu Akufu, a nephew of Ntim Gyakari, as the new, subordinate Denkyirahene.

Osei Tutu divided the territory among his supporters, with the Denkyiran refugees resettled as Asante vassals, and Amantuo communities growing in power and responsibility. The people of Asumegya founded the villages of Dominase and Agyemasu, and Osei Tutu resettled the Bontwumafo in Atwima (now Atwima Mponua and Atwima Nwabiagya Districts) and their leader was made the Atwimahene.

== As Asantehene ==
=== Akim ===
Although the victory over Denkyira had been crushing, Akyem, the Denkyiran ally, continued to fight. In addition, the remnants of the Denkyiran army who had fled south were still a threat to trade and stability. In 1702, these two defeated the Asante in a battle. In 1706, Boadu Akufu launched a rebellion. The Asante general Boansi Kofo, with the help of a deserter, ambushed the Denkyiran command at a war council and destroyed them, capturing and later executing Akufu.

=== Other Conquests ===
Having defeated Denkyira, Asante considered the former Denkyiran subject to now be subservient to them. Assin, Sehwi, and Twifo, however, had other ideas, and it took several more years of war for Osei Tutu to extend his hegemony over these states. In 1711 Tutu moved north against Wenchi, sacking the capital Ahwenekokoo and establishing Asante control over the trade routes north to Bonoman and Begho. Between 1713 and 1715 he turned south, conquering Twifo, Wassa, and Aowin . Osei Tutu formed an alliance with the Nzema to ensure access to the coastal trading posts.

=== Final Campaign and Death ===
In 1716 or 1717, the coastal Agona people called for help from the Asante in their war against Akyem. The Akwamu were longstanding allies of Kumasi, but were also the Agona's traditional overlords and did not appreciate Asante interference. They therefore allowed the Asante to march through their territory, but divulged the route to the Akyem, who managed to trap them in the deep forest. The army was surrounded, with little food and a rampant smallpox outbreak.

In October 1717 Osei Tutu, by now an old man, attempted to lead his army out of the trap by crossing River Pra, but they were attacked in the process. He was being carried in a hammock when he was struck by bullets from snipers and sharpshooters, who were hiding in the dense treeline. Unable to fight his way out of the river, the founder of Asanteman died and his body was never recovered.

== Legacy ==
Skillfully utilizing a combination of spiritual dogma and political skill, and ably supported by military prowess, Osei Tutu tripled the size of the small kingdom of Kumasi and laid the foundation for the Empire of Ashanti in the process.

A shrine in Anyinam commemorates the birth of Osei Tutu, and is being developed to attract heritage tourism.

== References and notes ==
=== Sources ===
- Arhin, Kwame (1967). "The Structure of Greater Ashanti (1700-1824)". Journal of African History. 8 (1): 65–85. doi:10.1017/S0021853700006836. JSTOR 180052.
- Chazan, Naomi (1988). "The Early State in Africa: The Asante Case". The Early State in African Perspective. Leiden: Brill.
- Fynn, J. K. (1974). "The Structure of Greater Ashanti: Another View". Transactions of the Historical Society of Ghana. 15 (1): 1–22. JSTOR 41406546.
- Hagan, George (1971). "Ashanti Bureaucracy: A Study of the Growth of Centralized Administration in Ashanti from the Time of Osei Tutu to the Time of Osei Tutu Kwamina Esibe Bonsu". Transactions of the Historical Society of Ghana. 12: 43–62. JSTOR 41405792.
- McCaskie, T. C. (2007). "Denkyira in the Making of Asante c. 1660–1720". The Journal of African History. 48 (1): 1–25. doi:10.1017/S0021853706002507. JSTOR 4501014.
- Prempeh, Osei Agyeman (2022). McCaskie, Tom M. (ed.). History of Ashanti. Oxford: Oxford University Press. ISBN 9780191991714.
- Priestley, Margaret; Wilks, Ivor (1960). "The Ashanti Kings in the Eighteenth Century: A Revised Chronology". Journal of African History. 1 (1): 83–96. doi:10.1017/S0021853700001511. JSTOR 179708.
- Reindorf, Carl Christian (1895). History of the Gold Coast and Asante, based on traditions and historical facts. Basel: Carl Christian Reindorf.
- Wilks, Ivor (1993). Forests of Gold: Essays on the Akan and the Kingdom of Asante. Athens: Ohio University Press.

=== Further reading ===
- "Osei Tutu (d. 1717)", Black History Pages.
- "Osei Tutu, King of Asante (1680 - 1717)" at archive.today
- "The Ashanti Kingdom".
- "Osei Tutu 1680-1717 King of Asante". Black History Timeline.
- "The Precolonial Period", in La Verle Berry, ed., Ghana: A Country Study. Washington: GPO for the Library of Congress, 1994.
- "The Asantehene | Otumfuo Nana Osei Tutu II", Kumasi Metropolitan Assembly.
- "Our King: Nana Kweku Dua is now Otumfuo Osei Tutu II, Asantehene"
- "His Majesty The King of Asante Otumfuo Osei Tutu II From Ghana, Makes First Visit to Boston - Wednesday, November 2, 2005"
