= Kingdom of Denkyira =

Former state in present-day Ghana

Kingdom of Denkyira Denkyira
- Part of Great Akan (pre-17th century)–1701 (as empire); 1896 (as independent kingdom)
- Denkyira at its greatest extent, c. 1699
- Status: Former kingdom
- Capital: Abankeseso (imperial capital); Dunkwa-on-Offin (modern)
- Common languages: Twi (Denkyira dialect)
- Religion: Akan religion and ancestor worship
- Government: Monarchy
- Denkyirahene
  - ?–c. 1632: Aha
  - c. 1632–c. 1637: Wirempe Ampem
  - c. 1637–1695: Boa Amponsem I
  - 1695–1701: Ntim Gyakari
- History
  - Established: Part of Great Akan (pre-17th century)
  - Establishment of Abankeseso: pre-17th century
  - Rise of Denkyira as an inland Akan power: Early 1600s
  - Conquest of Adansi: c. 1659
  - Battle of Feyiase: 1701
  - Migration to Dunkwa-on-Offin and Jukwaa: 1824
  - Alignment with the Fante Confederacy: 1868
  - Dissolution into British Gold Coast: 1896
  - Disestablished: 1701 (as empire); 1896 (as independent kingdom)
- Currency: Gold dust Cowrie shells
Preceded by	Succeeded by
Adanse; Akani (Arcania)	Ashanti Empire; British Gold Coast
- Today part of: Ghana; Ivory Coast

Denkyira (also known as Denkira, Denchira, or Dinkira) was an Akan kingdom that rose to prominence in precolonial Ghana, dominating large parts of the forest zone in the south-central Gold Coast. Centered around its capital at Abankeseso, Denkyira emerged as a leading gold-producing polity and a military power, particularly during the 17th century. At its height it reduced neighboring states such as Adanse, Sefwi, Kingdom of Aowin, Wassa, Kingdom of Assin, Kingdom of Twifo, and pre-Asante states to tributaries, and played a critical role in shaping regional trade and warfare. The ruler of the Denkyira kingdom is called the Denkyirahene.

In 1701, Denkyira was defeated by the Asante Empire and became a vassal. After a failed rebellion in 1824, the Denkyirahene and his people escaped south of the Ofin River, and maintain a non-sovereign monarchy based in Dunkwa to the present day.

== History ==
=== Origins and ancestry ===
Oral traditions trace Denkyira's ancestral roots to the Brong-Ahafo Region in the forest–savanna transition zone of what is now southern Ghana, with its early settlers first establishing themselves near Nkyiraa in the Bono area before moving southward into the Adanse region. During its formative period, Denkyira was politically subordinate to the older and more influential Adanse state, which was regarded in tradition as the spiritual and cultural heartland of the southern Akan forest. The Agona, who later founded the kingdom, lived along the western frontier of Adanse, occupying an area that stretched from Asokwa through Obuasi and Akrofuom to the banks of the Oda and Ofin rivers.

=== Kingdoms of Arcania and the Accanists ===
Early European accounts from the 16th and early 17th centuries referred to the inland Akan traders collectively as "Akani" (also rendered Accany, Acanij, or Acanes), without distinguishing between specific states. These traders controlled the flow of gold from the Pra, Ofin, and Birim valleys to the coast, and their settlements were described as the most significant suppliers of gold to the Portuguese and later the Dutch. Adanse and Denkyira were active during this period, but they were not identified by name on early European maps. Instead, sources grouped them under the broader designation of the Akani, a collective label used to describe the peoples of the forest region. According to K.Y. Daaku, Adanse and Denkyira formed part of Akani,a confederacy from which many of the ruling lineages of later Akan states like the Akyem, Kwawu, Asante, and Akwamu traced their ancestry.

=== Foundation of Abankeseso ===
A growing number of internal pressures, such as succession disputes and population growth, and external threats from rising militarized states caused migrations from Adanse. These pressures included the growing ambition of Denkyira itself. The Agona clan had by then moved westward from their Adanse homeland to occupy the strategic region between Asokwa and the Obuasi–Akrofuom corridor.

It was in this area, near the Oda and Ofe rivers, that Denkyira established its new capital, Abankeseso, also known in oral tradition as Ntibanso. The city soon developed into a major political and economic center, with institutions of political, military, and ritual authority consolidated at the site. Acorrding to T.C. McCaskie, Abankeseso may have had a high degree of urbanization and administrative sophistication by the 17th century.

=== Rise of imperial Denkyira ===
Denkyira's earliest expansion focused on extending its authority northwards to control important trade routes leading to the Bono Manso and Begho markets. By the mid-17th century, the kingdom had become the dominant Akan power in the Ofin–Pra basin. Following its conquest of Adanse, Denkyira expanded rapidly, exploiting the gold-rich valleys of the Ofin–Oda region and asserting authority over surrounding communities. This allowed the state to emerge as a major supplier of gold and enslaved people to European coastal traders. Its prominence grew through sustained interaction with European powers, particularly the Dutch and the English, who operated along the Gold Coast at Elmina and Cape Coast. In the 1660s, the Danish missionary Wilhelm Johann Müller, stationed at the coastal Fort Frederiksborg, recorded ethnographic observations in his work The African Country Fetu. Although his focus was the Kingdom of Fetu, Müller's account provides early insight into governance, religious belief, and military organization within Akan-speaking societies—systems that likely paralleled those within Denkyira's sphere of influence.

By around 1680, Abankeseso had developed beyond the status of an ordinary state capital into what Kea describes as an "imperial capital." Unlike the capitals of earlier aman such as Adanse or Assin, it exercised authority over multiple subordinate towns, reflecting the emergence of a new imperial administrative structure.

=== Regional conflicts ===
During the latter half of the 17th century, Denkyira advanced south and west, defeating the Sefwi, Wassa, and Aowin, thereby securing the western trade routes to the forts between Komenda and Assini and gaining control of their gold mines. In 1688 it supported Agona in a conflict with Akwamu, and later attempted to invade Fetu, an effort averted when European traders bribed Denkyira to withdraw. Its last major victory of the century came against King Agyensam of Assin at Koshea, leaving Assin impoverished and heavily indebted to the English, while securing Denkyira's trade routes to Cape Coast and Moure. By the early 1690s, these campaigns had consolidated Denkyira's supremacy over much of the central and western Gold Coast hinterland, setting the stage for its peak diplomatic engagement with European powers in 1692.

In 1698, Denkyira conquered Assin, destroying its towns and markets and imposing heavy tribute. This victory disrupted the Akani trading organization, whose merchant-broker networks had long dominated coastal exchange, and marked a turning point in the balance of power in the Pra–Ofin basin. By the end of the decade, it reached the western region of the Tano basin.

=== Peak power and European diplomacy ===
In 1692, representatives from the Dutch, English, and the Brandenburghers—German merchants from Brandenburg-Prussia—traveled inland to Abankeseso to engage directly with Denkyirahene Boamponsem. To manage these expanding external relations, the king appointed a resident envoy to the coast to supervise the collection of tribute from coastal states and regulate trade on the king's behalf, reflecting the state's deep involvement in trans-Atlantic commerce. Records from the Brandenburg African Company emphasize Denkyira's significance as a dominant power in the interior during this period.

Denkyira's diplomacy coincided with costly military campaigns. Throughout the 1690s, the kingdom fought prolonged wars against Asen and Twifo-Heman to secure control over southern gold and slave routes and maintain its commercial dominance. These engagements drained resources, weakened internal cohesion, and provoked dissent among tributary states subjected to heavy demands.

The financial and human costs of warfare undermined Denkyira's ability to project power in the north, where foreign reports began to reference a rising challenger: "the Great Prince Ozaay," a title clearly referring to Osei Tutu of Kwaaman (later the Asante). One Dutch observer noted: "Ozaay… the great prince of the interior, was said to command thousands and had begun to challenge Denkyira’s dominion in the north." Following the death of Boamponsem in 1694, Denkyira entered a period of instability. His successor, Ntim Gyakari, developed a reputation for authoritarianism and excessive tribute demands. His increasingly oppressive rule alienated subject territories, many of which began shifting allegiance to the Kwaaman alliance under Osei Tutu and his spiritual guide Okomfo Anokye.

=== War with Asante and decline ===
In 1701, Denkyira launched a northern campaign against Kwaaman, aiming to punish Osei Tutu for refusing tribute and for diverting trade away from Denkyira's coastal intermediaries. At the decisive Battle of Feyiase, Denkyira's forces were routed and Denkyirahene Ntim Gyakari was killed. Asante forces advanced south to sack Abankeseso, seizing the vast gold reserves of the Sikadan treasury.

Following this defeat, Denkyira was reduced to a tributary of the newly ascendant Asante Empire. Though it briefly reoccupied its ruined capital and rebelled between 1706 and 1707, the uprising was crushed, and the kingdom remained under Asante dominance thereafter.

=== Rebellion and independent monarchy ===
In 1823, Denkyira rebelled against Asante overlordship, but were defeated. The survivors were compelled to vacate their ancestral territory in the Ofin-Pra basin. By the early 19th century, the kingdom had migrated southward and established a new base around Jukwaa. Oral accounts attribute this movement to Denkyirahene Kwadwo Tibo, who led the relocation after Denkyira allied with the British during renewed hostilities with Ashanti. Along the journey, a portion of the group settled at Dunkwa-on-Offin, while the remainder continued to Jukwaa, which became the spiritual and ceremonial heart of the state.

Upon arrival, Denkyira coexisted peacefully with resident communities, including the Abiradzi lineage from Assin Kushia. Through intermarriage and collaboration, social cohesion was fostered, and a shared governance structure began to emerge. Although administrative functions later shifted to Dunkwa in the 20th century, the paramount stool remained enshrined in Jukwaa, where key state ceremonies and rituals continue to be held. In 1868, Denkyira aligned itself with the Fante Confederacy, a coastal alliance that had embraced British protection. This political shift placed the kingdom in direct opposition to the Ashanti Empire, which had developed strategic ties with the Dutch.

Today, the capital of Denkyira is Dunkwa-on-Offin, located near the historic gold fields of the former kingdom. The Denkyirahene's official palace is the Amponsem Fie. One of the most recent rulers was Odeefuo Boa Amponsem III, who reigned until his death, announced on 2 December 2016.

== Society ==
=== Military and political development ===
From its earliest rulers in the early 17th century, Denkyira developed an integrated military–administrative system that became the foundation of its rise. The first three rulers established a structure in which the state was divided among powerful nsafohene ("wing chiefs") who mobilized their divisions in wartime and governed their territories in peacetime.

The kingdom implemented a tripartite command system, dividing its forces and territories into three main divisions: the Right Wing (Akumatire), Left Wing (Kyeremfem), and Advance Guard (Agona Adontendom). Each was headed by an Osafohene with both civil and military authority. Conquests brought in large numbers of captives, who were either incorporated into the army or settled in strategic areas to secure trade routes and produce food and gold.

Denkyira was central to the "military revolution" of the late seventeenth century, when inland states shifted from spear-based shock tactics to firearms. Mass mobilization, or levée en masse, became common as all able-bodied men were liable for conscription. These developments allowed Denkyira to project power across the Gold Coast interior and to establish the first imperial-style administration in the region.

=== Governance and symbols of sovereignty ===
During the reign of Boa Amponsem I, the monarchy formalized symbols of kingship that legitimized royal authority, including the Abankamdwa stool, the Sasatia knife, and the Executioner's Sword. These regalia became central to Denkyira's political theology and were later absorbed into the sacred regalia of its successors.

Alongside these symbols, the state developed an advanced administrative hierarchy. Before c.1680 Akan polities were organized around state capitals (Oman) such as Adanse, Assin, and Twifo. Following Denkyira's expansion, Abankeseso emerged as an "imperial capital," a higher-level center that exercised authority over multiple subordinate towns.

Government was not exercised by the monarch alone. The Denkyirahene was advised by a council of chiefs drawn from the principal clans and territorial divisions of the state, mirroring broader Akan political traditions.

== Economy ==
=== Gold production and tribute ===
Denkyira's wealth was rooted in its control over the gold-rich valleys of the Ofin–Pra basin and the systematic tribute it exacted from conquered states. Gold from tributary territories and mining districts was accumulated in the royal treasury at Abankeseso, known as Sikadan ("house of gold"), which served as both the political capital and the financial center of the kingdom. The concentration of resources allowed the state to sustain its military and finance expansions.

=== Trade and merchants ===
By the late seventeenth century, Abankeseso had developed into a major commercial and credit center. Merchants were described by Europeans as "the best traders on this coast," and the kingdom itself as "the richest country in gold." They maintained regular dealings with English and Dutch factories, purchasing textiles, iron bars, brassware, and gunpowder in exchange for gold. Tribute imposed on subject states was sometimes underwritten by European credit, secured with gold pawns or hostages. Alongside royal wealth, a prosperous mercantile class emerged, exemplified by traders such as Badu Agyesa, who deposited substantial hoards of gold with European factors for safekeeping.

== Legacy ==
Like Adanse, Denkyira continued to shape political culture after its fall from power. Though its dominance ended following defeat by the Asante Empire, its institutional and cultural imprint endured across southern Ghana. The kingdom played a foundational role in the evolution of Akan statecraft, leaving behind models that shaped successor states, most notably Asante.

Denkyira's regalia, political titles, and military framework were absorbed into Asante institutions following its conquest. Sacred objects such as the Abankamdwa stool and Sasatia knife became part of the royal treasury at Kumasi. The concept of the Golden Stool, the symbolic heart of Asante identity and unity is attributed to Denkyira's influence.

== See also ==
- Rulers of the Akan state of Denkyira
- Great Akan
- Asante Empire
- Adanse
- Kingdom of Twifo
- Kingdom of Assin
- Akwamu Empire
- Upper Denkyira District
- Twifo/Heman/Lower Denkyira District

== Sources ==
- Barbot, Jean (1732). A Description of the Coasts of North and South Guinea. London: Churchill.
- Boaten, Kwasi Abayie (1971). "The Asante Before 1700". Institute of African Studies Research Review. 8 (1): 50–65. Archived from the original on 27 May 2025.
- Buah, F. K. (1980). A History of Ghana (Illustrated, revised ed.). Macmillan. pp. 10–11. ISBN 9780333659342.
- Daaku, Kwame Yeboa (1970). Trade and Politics on the Gold Coast, 1600–1720: A Study of the African Reaction to European Trade. Oxford: Clarendon Press. ISBN 019821653X.
- Daaku, Kwame Y. (1971). "History in the Oral Traditions of the Akan". Journal of the Folklore Institute. 8 (2/3): 114–126.
- Gordon, J. (1953). "Some Oral Traditions of Denkyira". Transactions of the Gold Coast & Togoland Historical Society. 1 (3): 27–33.
- Gyamfi, Kwaku Effah (1975). Traditional History of the Bono State. Institute of African Studies, University of Ghana. p. 71.
- Jones, Adam (1982). "Double Dutch? A Survey of Seventeenth-Century German Sources for West African History". History in Africa. 9: 141–153. doi:10.2307/3171603.
- Konadu, Kwasi (2016). Konadu, Kwasi; Campbell, Clifford C. (eds.). The Ghana Reader: History, Culture, Politics. Duke University Press. pp. 53–58. ISBN 9780822359845.
- Fynn, J. K. (1987). "The Political System of the Fante of Ghana during the Pre-Colonial Period". Unwersitas (University of Ghana, Legon). 9.
- Kea, Ray A. (1982). Settlements, Trade, and Polities in the Seventeenth Century Gold Coast. Baltimore and London: Johns Hopkins University Press. ISBN 978-0-8018-2310-7.
- McCaskie, T. C. (2007). "Denkyira in the Making of Asante c. 1660–1720". The Journal of African History. 48 (1): 1–25.
- Wilks, Ivor (1957). "The Rise of the Akwamu Empire, 1650–1710". Transactions of the Historical Society of Ghana. 3 (2): 25–45.
- Wilks, Ivor (2005). "The Forest and the Twis". Journal des africanistes. 75 (1): 19–75. doi:10.4000/africanistes.188.
