= Hammer and anvil =

Military tactic

The hammer and anvil is a military tactic involving the use of two primary forces, one to pin down an enemy, and the other to smash or defeat the opponent with an encirclement maneuver. It may involve a frontal assault by one part of the force, playing a slower-moving or more static role. The second phase involves a more mobile force that maneuvers around the enemy and attacks from behind or the flank to deliver a decisive blow.

The "hammer and anvil" tactic is fundamentally a single envelopment, and is to be distinguished from a simple encirclement where one group simply keeps an enemy occupied, while a flanking force delivers the coup de grace. The strongest expression of the concept is where both echelons are sufficient in themselves to strike a decisive blow. The "anvil" echelon here is not a mere diversionary gambit, but a substantial body that hits the enemy hard to pin him down and grind away his strength. The "hammer" or maneuver element succeeds because the anvil force materially or substantially weakens the enemy, preventing him from adjusting to the threat in his flank or rear. Other variants of the concept allow for an enemy to be held fast by a substantial blocking or holding force, while a strong echelon, or hammer, delivers the decisive blow. In all scenarios, both the hammer and anvil elements are substantial entities that can cause significant material damage to opponents, as opposed to light diversionary, or small scale holding units.

== Antiquity ==
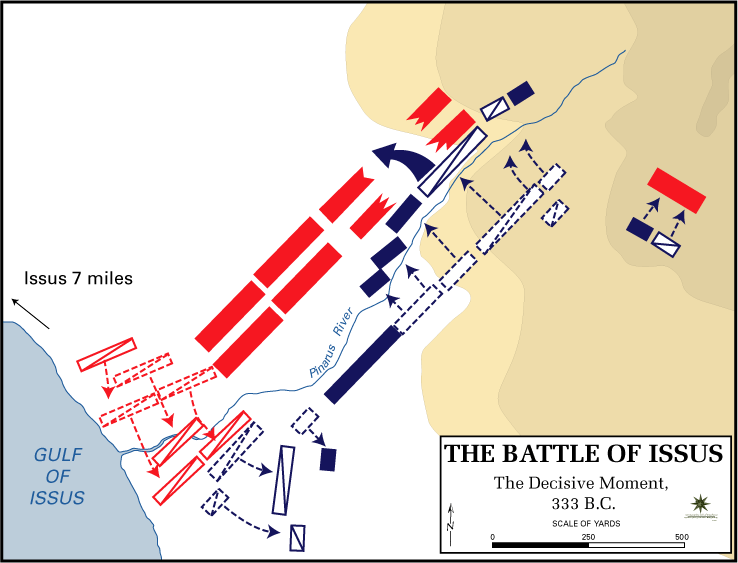
The Battle of Issus

=== Battle of Issus ===
The tactic was used in Antiquity, as the maneuver's origins used light cavalry, ubiquitous in the ancient world. The tactic also worked with the heavy cataphracts of the Eastern world. It appeared in a number of battles fought by the ancient Greeks and Romans. In addition to being used in many of Alexander the Great's battles, it was also used during the Second Punic War during the Battle of Cannae and the Battle of Zama.

=== Battle of Pharsalus ===
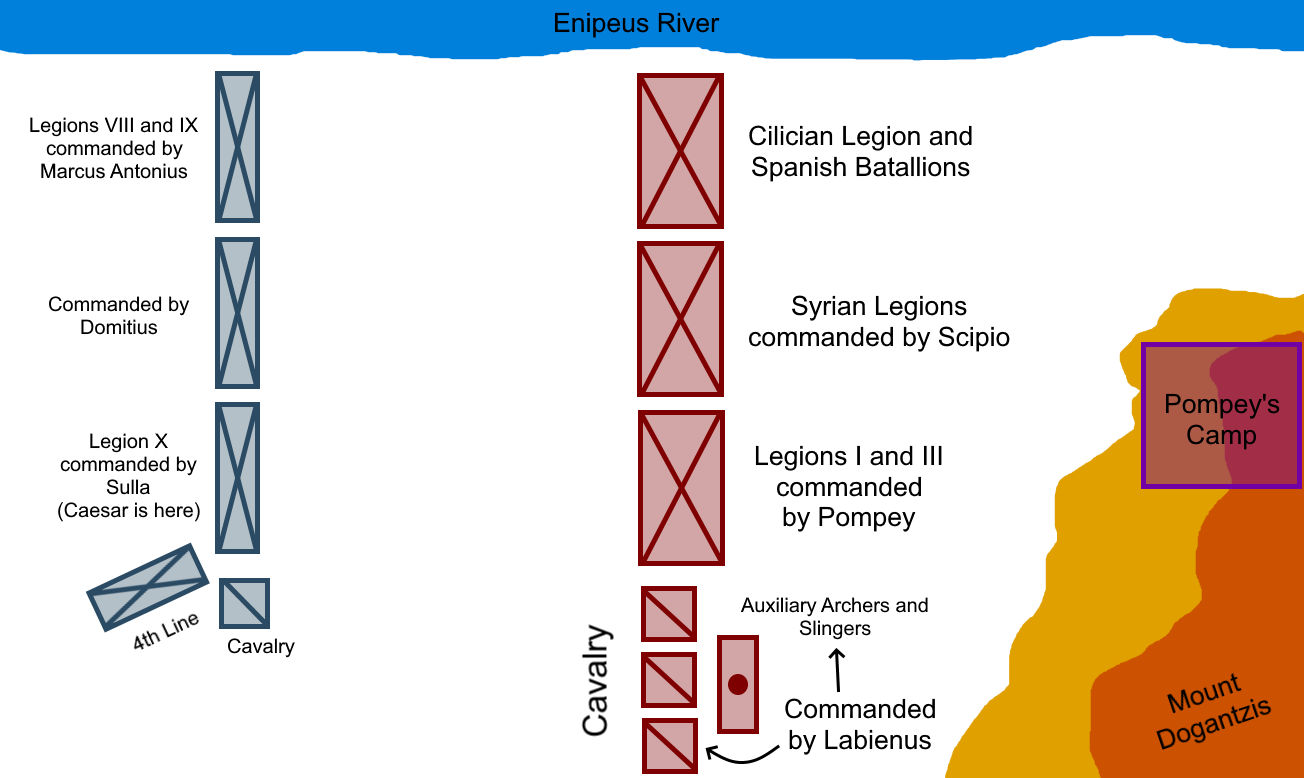
Pompey attempted to use his left flank cavalry as a hammer stroke while his heavy infantry held Caesar's legions fast in the center

In 48 BC, Pompey the Great attempted to use it against Julius Caesar at the Battle of Pharsalus, in what was to be the decisive battle of the Great Roman Civil War. Caesar countered this by ambushing Pompey's "hammer" element with a hidden fourth line of infantry; Pompey's infantry was to be the anvil while his cavalry 'hammer' encircled Caesar's right flank. There was significant distance between the two armies, according to Caesar.

As the infantry of Caesar advanced, Pompey ordered his men not to charge, but to wait until Caesar's legions came into close quarters; Pompey's adviser Gaius Triarius believed that Caesar's infantry would be fatigued and fall into disorder if they were forced to cover twice the expected distance of a battle march. Also, stationary troops were expected to be able to defend better against pila throws. Seeing that Pompey's army was not advancing, Caesar's infantry under Mark Antony and Gnaeus Domitius Calvinus started the advance. As Caesar's men neared throwing distance, without orders, they stopped to rest and regroup before continuing the charge; Pompey's right and centre line held as the two armies collided. Caesar countered this by positioning the reserves of his 4th line to intercept the attacking cavalry.

As Pompey's infantry fought, Labienus ordered the Pompeian cavalry on his left flank to attack Caesar's cavalry; as expected they successfully pushed back Caesar's cavalry. Caesar then revealed his hidden fourth line of infantry and surprised Pompey's cavalry charge; Caesar's men were ordered to leap up and use their pila to thrust at Pompey's cavalry instead of throwing them. Pompey's cavalry panicked and suffered hundreds of casualties, as Caesar's cavalry came about and charged after them. After failing to reform, the rest of the Pompey's cavalry retreated to the hills, leaving the left wing of Pompey's legions exposed to the hidden troops as Caesar's cavalry wheeled around their flank. Caesar then ordered in his third line, containing his most battle-hardened veterans, to attack. This broke Pompey's left wing troops, who fled the battlefield.

After routing Pompey's cavalry, Caesar threw in his last line of reserves. Pompey lost the will to fight as he watched both cavalry and legions under his command break formation and flee from battle, and he retreated to his camp, leaving the rest of his troops at the centre and right flank to their own devices. He ordered the garrisoned auxiliaries to defend the camp as he escaped. As the rest of Pompey's army were left confused, Caesar urged his men to end the day by routing the rest of Pompey's troops and capturing the Pompeian camp. They complied with his wishes; after finishing off the remains of Pompey's men, they furiously attacked the camp walls. The Thracians and the other auxiliaries who were left in the Pompeian camp, in total seven cohorts, defended bravely, but were not able to fend off the assault.

== Early modern era to World War I ==
=== The Ashanti versus the British – 1874 ===
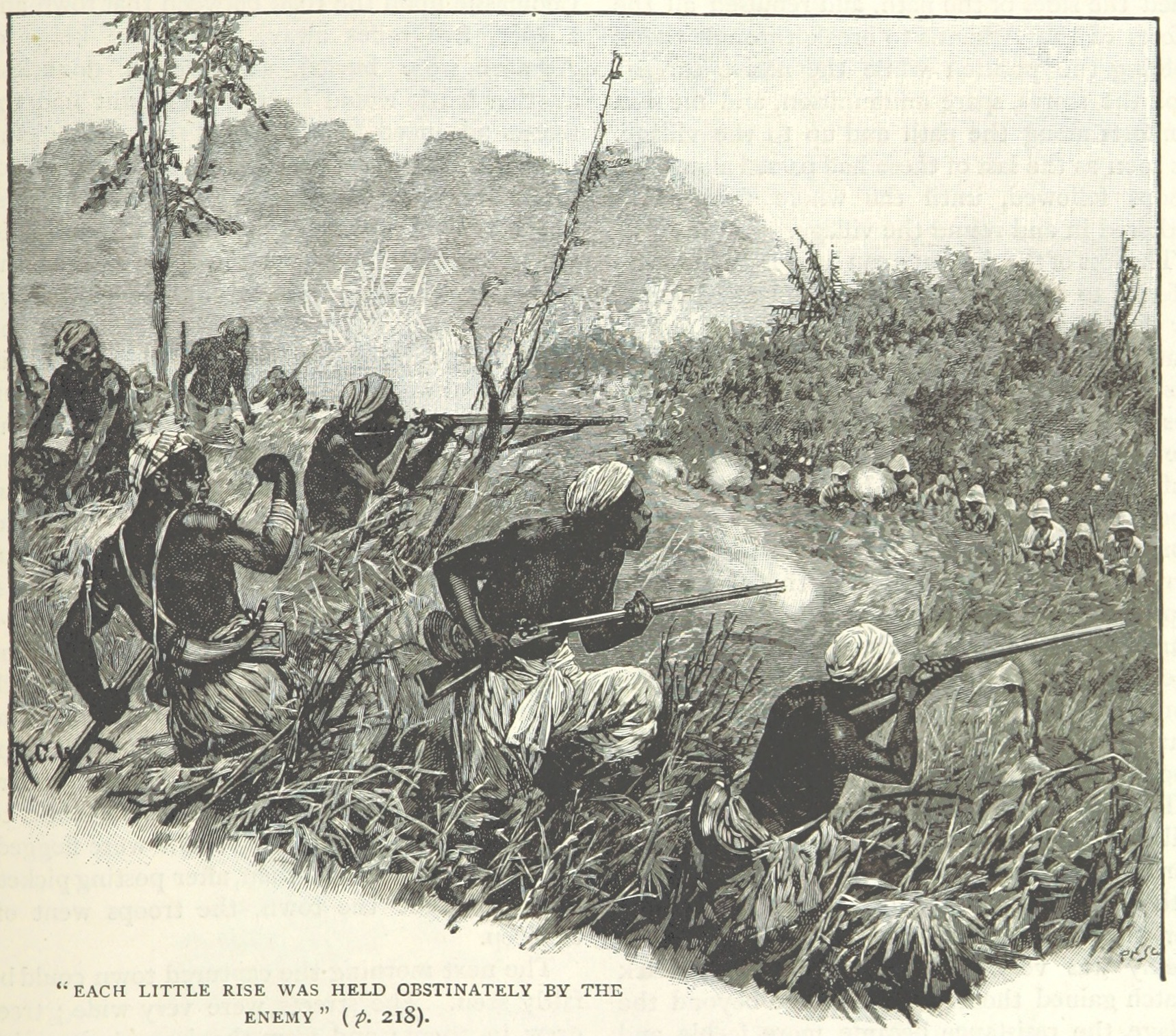
Scene from Third Anglo-Ashanti War 1874

The colonial wars of the 1800s saw some African armies employ hammer-and-anvil tactics. In 1874, a strong British force under Sir Garnet Wolseley, armed with modern rifles and artillery, invaded the territory of the Ashanti Empire. The Ashanti military did not confront the British immediately, and made no major effort to interdict their long, vulnerable lines of communication through the jungle terrain. Their plan appeared to be to draw the British deep into their territory, against a strong defensive anvil centred at the town of Amoaful. Here, the British would be tied down, while manoeuvring wing elements circled to the rear, trapping and cutting them off. Some historians, such as Byron Farwell, note that this approach was a traditional Ashanti battle strategy, and was common in some African armies as well. At the village of Amoaful, the Ashantis succeeded in luring their opponents forward, but could not make any headway against the modern firepower of the British forces, which laid down a barrage of fire to accompany an advance of infantry in squares. This artillery fire took a heavy toll on the Ashanti, but they left a central blocking force in place around the village, while unleashing a large flanking attack on the left, that almost enveloped the British line and successfully broke into some of the infantry squares. Ashanti weaponry, however, was poor compared to the modern weapons deployed by the British, and such superior arms served the British well in repulsing the dangerous Ashanti encirclements. As one participant noted:

The Ashantees stood admirably, and kept up one of the heaviest fires I ever was under. While opposing our attack with immediately superior numbers, they kept enveloping our left with a constant series of well-directed flank attacks.

Wolesey had studied and anticipated the Ashanti "horseshoe" formations, and had strengthened the British flanks with the best units and reinforced firepower. He was able to shift this firepower to threatened sectors to stymie enemy maneuvers, defeating their hammer and anvil elements and forcing his opponents to retreat. One British combat post-mortem pays tribute to the slain Ashanti commander for his tactical leadership and use of terrain:

The great Chief Amanquatia was among the killed. Admirable skill was shown in the position selected by Amanquatia, and the determination and generalship he displayed in the defence fully bore out his great reputation as an able tactician and gallant soldier.

== World War II ==
=== Battle of Caen ===
The British anvil in the east held the bulk of the German armor fast and worked it over, until the American hammer was able to break through in the west, destroying the German front.

When the Allies landed at Normandy, the strategy used by the commander of the D-Day land forces, General Bernard Montgomery, was to confront the feared German panzers with constantly attacking British armies on the eastern flank of the beachhead. The role of the British forces would be to act as a great shield for the Allied landing, constantly sucking the German armour on to a great "anvil" on the left (east), and constantly grinding it down with punishing blows from artillery, tanks and Allied aircraft. As the anvil held the bulk of the German armor fast, this would open the way for the Americans to wield a great "hammer" in the west, on the right of the Allied line, breaking through the German defenses, where the Americans led by such commanders as "Lightning" Joe Collins, could run free. The British role would thus not be a glamorous one, but a tough battle in a punishing cauldron of attrition, in and around the key strategic city of Caen.

The Germans had initially counterattacked the Normandy beachhead with powerful panzer and mobile forces hoping to drive to the sea by creating a wedge between the US and British armies. Failing this, they were then faced with a large, menacing British advance towards Caen, that threatened to collapse a great portion of their front, presenting a credible and very dangerous breakthrough threat. The British and Canadian divisions were not a secondary, defensively-oriented holding or diversionary force, but aggressively sought to penetrate and destroy the German front. The Germans were thus forced to commit their strongest echelons in the theatre, the mobile panzer and SS units to avoid this peril. These were pulled deeper and deeper against the attritional anvil on the eastern flank, slowly corroding German strength and capability. The bitter confrontation tied down and weakened the Wehrmacht, thus eventually paving the way for a crushing American breakthrough in the west.

As General Montgomery signaled on June 25, 1944:

When the American attack went in west of St Lo at 1100 hours on 25 July, the main enemy armoured strength of six panzer and SS divisions was deployed on the eastern flank facing the British Army. This is a good dividend. The Americans are going well and I think things will now begin to move towards the plan outlined in M512.

Supreme Allied Commander Dwight Eisenhower affirmed Montgomery's overall strategy in a message of 10 July, urging stronger efforts:

I am familiar with your plan for generally holding firmly with your left, attracting thereto all of the enemy armour, while your right pushes down the Peninsula and threatens the rear and flank of the forces facing the Second British Army.. It appears to me that we must use all possible energy in a determined effort to prevent a stalemate or facing the necessity of fighting a major defensive battle with the slight depth we now have in the bridgehead... please be assured that I will produce everything that is humanly possible to assist you in any plan that promises to get us the elbow room we need. The air and everything else will be available."

Montgomery's overall "hammer and anvil" conception of the battle eventually resulted in success, but it took two months of bitter fighting in and around Caen.

== Post World War II ==
=== Communist Insurgency in South Korea ===
In early 1950, prior to the North Korean People's Army's southward advance across the 38th parallel, the North frequently launched small offensives at the border and inserted thousands of guerillas infiltrators into the South as far as Jeju Island in hopes of achieving the overthrow of President Syngman Rhee and the imposition of a communist government. After a number of Republic of Korea Army (ROKA) counterinsurgency successes, the North Koreans waged a final attempt at inciting revolution by sending two battalion-sized units of guerillas under the commands of Kim Sang-ho and Ki Moo-hyon. The first unit was, over the course of several engagements with the ROKA 6th Division, destroyed with only one survivor. The second was also annihilated by a two-battalion hammer-and-anvil maneuver by units of the ROKA 6th Division. The KPA guerillas lost 584 (480 killed, 104 captured) and the ROKA troops reported 69 killed and 184 wounded. It would prove to be the last major effort of the communist north to annex the south until the invasion on 25 June 1950.

== See also ==
- Encirclement
