= Odeefuo Boa Amponsem III =

Odeefuo Boa Amponsem III (11 November 1923 – December 2016), born Michael Kwame Mensah and later John Kwame Amofa Appiah, was a member of the Agona royalist clan. The firstborn and only son of Kwasi Apeagyei and Abena Tweneboa, he was popularly called Kwame Mensah.

Kwame attended elementary school in Dunkwa-on-Offin, finishing in 1948, and secondary school at St Augustine’s College in Cape Coast, finishing in 1952. As a holder of the Senior Cambridge School Certificate he taught at the Dunkwa Catholic Senior High School in 1953. He worked with Gold Coast Railways in 1954 after acquiring technical training at Railway Technical Training School at Takoradi. John Kwame Amofa Appiah was enstooled on 11 February 1955 and named as Odeefuo Boa Amposem III. After the installation he went to Lincoln University, Pennsylvania to gain Diploma in Public Administration..

He completed his education in 1957 and resumed his traditional duty as "Denkyirahene" ruler of the Denkyira state in the latter part of 1957 till his passing in 2016. He was buried in April 2022.

== Childhood ==
Odeefuo Boa Amponsem was born on 11 November 1923 as a first child and only son of Kwasi Apeagyei and Abena Tweneboa (from Agona royalist clan), both residents of Jukwa, Central Region.

He lost his father during the farming season in 1930. After the death of his father, his mum realising the difficulties in raising a royalist as a woman and a single parent took Kwame to her cousin, Nana Owusu Bore II who had then been enstooled as the 17th Denkyirahene to be groomed at the palace. She also passed on two months after taking her son to her cousin.

Boa Amponsem had his traditional education at the palace by his Uncle and predecessor, Nana Owusu Bore II.

=== Educational Background ===
He started his formal education in Jukwa in the last quarter of the 1940 school year.

After spending three weeks in Primary I, Kwame Mensah was promoted to Primary II and then to Primary III before the end of the school year.

He showed remarkable ability in English spelling, Arithmetic and copy writing and he further impressed his teachers with his brilliance.

In January 1941, he entered Standard I and moved gradually to Standard III in 1943.

He continued his education in Dunkwa-on-Offin when the colonial government directed the Denkyira Traditional Council to move the administrative headquarters of the state to Dunkwa where there were modern facilities and better physical infrastructure.

He finally finished his elementary school in Dunkwa-on-Offin in 1948.

He then proceeded to High School at St Augustine’s College in Cape Coast and completed in 1952.

As a holder of the Senior Cambridge School Certificate he taught at the Dunkwa Catholic Senior High School in 1953.

He worked with Gold Coast Railways in 1954 after acquiring technical training at Railway Technical Training School at Takoradi.

John Kwame Amofa Appiah (Kwame Mensah) was enstooled on 11 February 1955 and named Odeefuo Boa Amposem III.

After the installation he went to Lincoln University, Pennsylvania to gain Diploma in Public Administration.

He completed his education in 1957 and fully resumed his traditional duty as ruler of the Denkyira state in the latter part of 1957 till his passing in 2015.

=== Traditional Education ===
Nana Owusu Bore II took special interest in giving his nephew traditional education at the palace. This kind of education consisted of practical tuition in horn blowing and its interpretation; drum playing and dancing to the tunes of Kete, Fontonfrom, Apagya, Adowa-Kete, Mpebi, Ntahera or Mmenson and Aperade drums. Other training sessions took the form of listening to and learning the oral traditions and history of the Denkyira state, the appellations of various Denkyira kings and warriors and how to speak to the warriors at the battlefield by way of the talking drums. Learning various Akan proverbs and wise sayings also form part of the curriculum of this most interesting education. Finally, there was a modest practical training in Kente weaving after introductory lessons in design making, names and meanings of various traditional clothes including the Adinkra. Before he left St. Augustine’s College in 1952 it was quite clear that Kwame Mensah was well equipped to assume the office of Denkyirahene anytime the opportunity came. He had received a comprehensive formal traditional education which none of his ancestors and predecessors had the chance to enjoy.

== Reign ==
=== The first attempt at enstoolment ===
When for any reason the stool of an Akan state, town or village becomes vacant much maneuvering goes on among eligible claimants. This is largely because there are generally more lineages in the clan and each lineage may want its member to be nominated. The competition could be very fierce with factions among the kingmakers and the people supporting this or that candidate as against others. There are, however, certain qualities which the candidates must possess.

Traditionally, these include native intelligence, wisdom, respectability, humility, an unblemished moral life, knowledge of and respect for the customs and traditions of the people and ability to speak in public. These days an additional qualification, that is, formal education has become an advantage to those contestants who possess it. Having these qualities, however, does not make one an automatic choice. There are certain physical attributes which may negate the above. Examples are left handedness, an unbearably short stature, extreme stammering, dismemberment of a limb or other part of the body and circumcision.

It appeared that Kwame Mensah could top a long list of contestants when in 1954 the issue of finding a new Denkyirahene came up. However, an uncle of Kwame Mensah, showed keen interest in becoming the next Denkyirahene. In 1954, most of the kingmakers were indeed on this Uncle's side. He was the chairman of the Youth Association at Jukwa and the town's people liked him very much especially because of his enthusiasm in leading the people in communal labour at Jukwa. The kingmakers felt Kwame Mensah was too young though better educated than his uncle and that perhaps he Kwame Mensah would find difficulties if installed. Another unfortunate thing was that Mensah could not benefit from the influence of a mother which is so vital in such situations. After many persuasions, Kwame Mensah returned to the Railway Technical Training School at Takoradi where he was then a student to continue his professional training. The situation at Jukwa and in Denkyira as a whole, however, remained tense after June 1954 when the first attempts at the enstoolment of Kwame Mensah failed.

== The enstoolment of Odeefuo Boa Amponsem III, 18th Denkyirahene ==
By February 1955 majority of the kingmakers, elders and youth of Denkyira had thrown their weight behind Kwame Mensah. There was gradually a change of attitude among others especially the kingmakers who realized that Kwame Mensah’s long service at the Ahenfie (palace) at both Jukwa and Dunkwa 1941-1955 had given him enough background education in traditional administration, at court and that his formal schooling had given him an added advantage. Again as a young man he stood the chance of reigning for a long time so that he could lay down long-term programmes and see to their successful implementation. Moreover, the youth, especially the educated ones in both Lower and Upper Denkyira saw Kwame Mensah as their own candidate and one whom they could associate with instead of his elderly Uncle. All these factors led the kingmakers eventually to prevail upon his Uncle to abandon his schemes for the throne and support his better qualified nephew. As his support waned drastically, Kwame Mensah's uncle gained greater respect when he showed his statesmanship by abandoning his plans and throwing his full weight behind his nephew. The way was then cleared for the enstoolment of Kwame Mensah.

On 7 February 1955, people were sent to collect him. As it is usually done among the Akan, the whole exercise must have an element of surprise. The large body of people who went concealed themselves away from the residence of Kwame Mensah while his uncle himself led a small group to the Railway Station where he worked. This group included the Secretary of the Denkyira Traditional Council and a few state linguists. In simple language they informed Kwame Mensah that the time had come for him to mount the great stool of his ancestors and that they had come to take him to Jukwa.

Within a few hours Mr. Mensah reconciled his records and accounts and handed over all his documents to an assistant. Things moved in rapid succession. Soon after reaching his quarters, the people who had concealed themselves converged on the compound amid shouts, songs and drums. Led by Linguist, Okyeame Atta, they put Kwame Mensah in a large passenger lorry they had hired for the journey from and to Jukwa. But that was after the elders had satisfied themselves that Mensah has "no scar", that is, "he is a complete man" in plain language that he was not circumcised. This had thrown the people into great jubilation and they brought him away to Jukwa.

Immediately upon arrival at Jukwa they put Kwame Mensah in a room for the traditional confinement for days and on 11 February 1955 the solemn installation ceremony took place. He was named Odeefuo Boa Amponsem III, 18th Denkyirahene.

== Public Service ==
From 1966, Odeefuo Boa Amponsem III had a rich record of public service entailing membership on Public Boards and Corporations, Chieftaincy Affairs, and Political and Constitutional matters. All the while performing his traditional duties as Denkyirahene.

From 1969 through to 14 January 1972, Odeefuo served as Chairman of the Board of Directors, New times Corporation and he helped formulate policies and regulations that ensured the smooth operation of the Corporation.

About the same time, that is from 1970 to 1972, he was a member of the National Family Planning Council, a body charged with the responsibility of formulating policies, strategies and programmes to control Ghana’s rapid population growth.

In his home state Denkyira, Odeefuo served as a member of the Management Board of Dunkwa Boa Amponsem Secondary School for the five years 1970 – 1975. For another five years he was President of the Ghana Co-operative Organisations in the country. It was in this capacity that Odeefuo Boa Amponsem III represented Ghana at the 1980 Moscow Congress on World Co-operative Movement.

In the second field, that of chieftaincy affairs, Odeefuo has had his share of service to that institution. He fully participated in all meetings of the Joint Provincial Council at Dodowa; he was a founding member of the Joint Houses of Chiefs which later was turned into the National House of chiefs. For seventeen years he was a member of the National House of Chiefs serving in various capacities as Registrar, Chairman of the Research Committee, and Chairman of the Public Relations Committee. As a paramount chief Odeefuo continued to be a member of the Central Regional House of Chiefs having served as its president for six years 1973 – 1979 for the 2nd term and at National House of Chiefs as the 9th President from 1999 to 2001.

The third phase of Odeefuo’s public service relates to political and constitutional matters. During the era of the National Liberation Council the government appointed him to the membership of the Political committee. This body advised the government on all political matters especially the eventual return to civilian/constitutional rule. After the dissolution of the Political Committee following the creation of the Second Republic, the government appointed Odeefuo to serve on the membership of the Central Regional Executive Board of the Centre for Civic Education. The Centre had been set up to educate Ghanaians in their civic rights, responsibilities and obligations with a view to making them more politically conscious and interested in working to ensure the practice of democracy in Ghana. Odeefuo held that laudable experiment to an end. The coup in 1972, however, did not end Odeefuo’s service to the nation.

During the Supreme Military Council era when arrangements were being made to return the country once again to civilian rule, Odeefuo was nominated to serve on the Constituent Assembly (1978 – 1979); and he actively participated in the Assembly’s deliberations which finally produced the 1979 constitution. Under the government of the P.N.D.C too Odeefuo served in two areas. From 1987 – 1989 he was appointed to the membership of the Central Regional Consultative council – the highest governing body of the region. And finally he was a government nominee to the National Consultative Assembly which prepared the 1992 Constitution that ushered in the Fourth Republic.

Such have been the life and times of Odeefuo Boa Amponsem III seen in the larger context of developments in Denkyira and Ghana as a whole. He has paid attention to the revival of Denkyira customs and traditions; he has given much attention to education in his state, he has succeeded in ensuring a reasonable degree of peace and stability in his state; and he has helped in the economic transformation of Lower Denkyira by co-operating with the UNDP/CEDECOM in establishing the Kakum Nature Reserve as a tourist centre.

Finally through his public service and foreign travel he has helped advertise the name and rich culture of Denkyira here and abroad. Today many people are aware of the location of Denkyira and the name Odeefuo Boa Amponsem III, Denkyirahene is familiar to many. These are indeed laudable achievements though the Denkyirahene considered them as quite modest. He was more optimistic about the future of the Denkyira state as he sums up his aspirations, "I even have greater hope that those who will come after me will be able to do more and even better for our dear Denkyira and the nation as a whole".
