= Gyimi River =

Gyimi River Jimi River
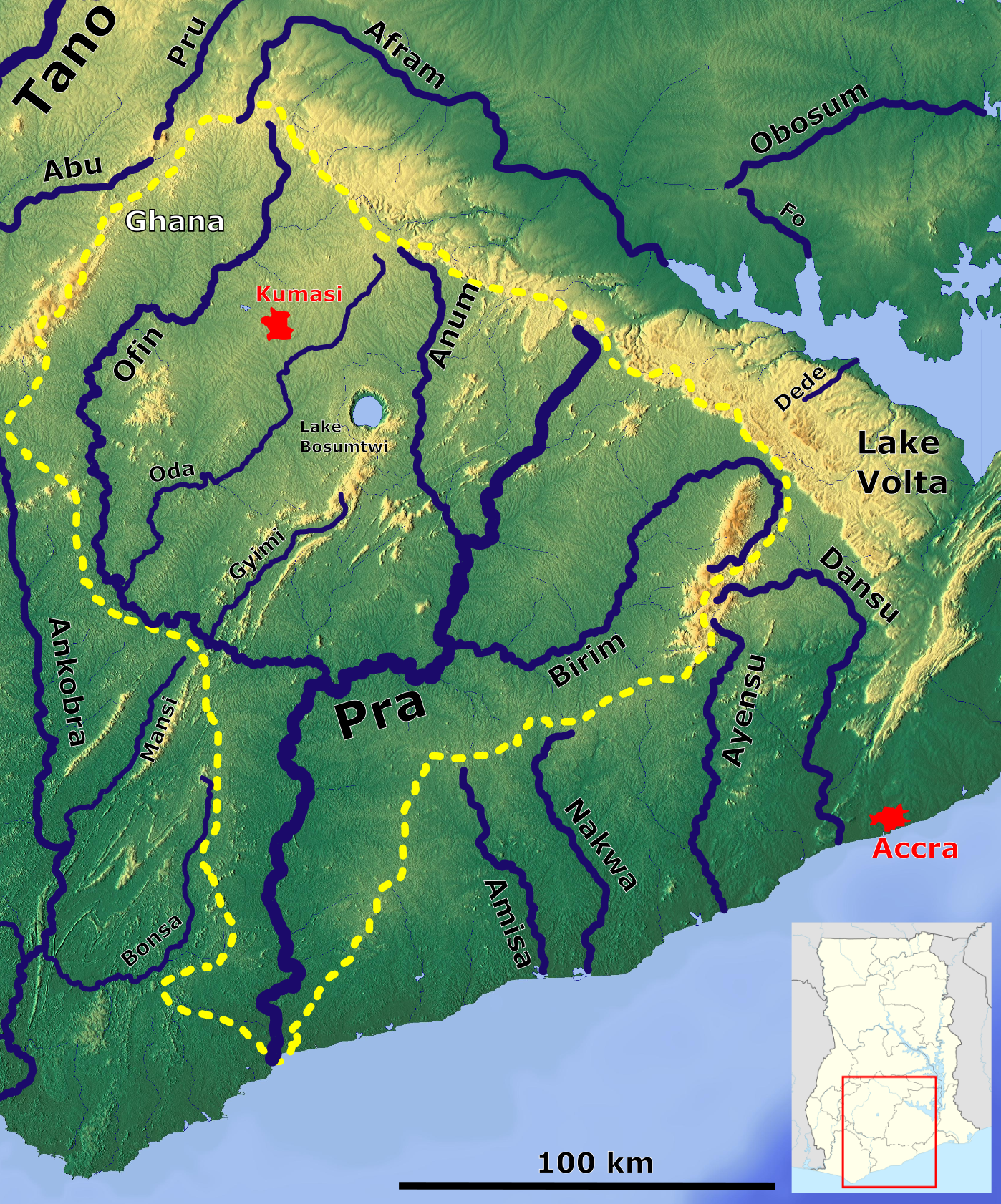
- South Ghana with the Ofin (left) and Gyimi River

Location
- Country: Ghana

Physical characteristics
- Mouth: Ofin River
  - coordinates: 5°58′49.9″N 1°46′27.5″W
  - elevation: 102 meters
- Length: 10 km (6.2 mi)
- Discharge
  - location: Mouth

Gyimi river also known as Jimi River is a stream in Ashanti Region, Ghana. It forms in area of a Naimakrom settlement. It confluence with Ofin River is near town Dunkwa-on-Offin.

Word gyimi in the Twi language of the Akan people can be roughly translated as foolery or not normal.

== Water pollution ==
Within the Gyimi (Jimi) river basin heavy metal contamination is present. It is caused by mining operations.

== See also ==
- Obuasi Gold Mine
