= Jukwaa =

Town in the Central Region of Ghana

Jukwaa Dwokwaa
- Town
- Country: Ghana
- Region: Central Region
- District: Twifo-Ati Mokwa
- Time zone: UTC+0 (GMT)

Jukwaa, also known as Dwokwaa, is a town in the Central Region of Ghana. It is the traditional capital of the people of Denkyira and is located in the Twifo-Ati Mokwa District in the Central Region. The Jukwa Senior High School is found in this town.

== Places to visit ==
Jukwaa Cultural Village
