= Nana Obiri Yeboa =

17th-century African monarch

Nana Obiri Yeboa was the Kwamanhene during his era and the occupant of the Aban Dwa Stool. He reigned from 1660 to 1680. He was succeeded by Nana Osei Tutu as the chief of Kwaman state which was later known as Kumasi state. He was the uncle of Osei Tutu. Nana Obiri Yeboa's uncle was Nana Oti Akenten.

== Personal life ==
Yeboa was a formally a trader by profession before ascending the throne. He was a frequent traveler and lived in Damanten in Akyem Kotoku. He married the sister of the Damantehene, named Nana Nyarko. The Chief of Damante was called Nana Nkatia Brempong. He came to join his sister and brother-in-law to live in Kumasi and he helped them rule Kumase. They gave birth to Nana Sabin Panin and Nana Bemraafi.

== The war of Dormaa ==
The war was fought at Suntreso, a town in Kumasi. Nana Obiri charged Nana Ntiamoah and one of the foundation members of his allies to watch the road leading to a village called Abanpera Daase. It was the place where the chief of Dormaa took residence. Nana Ntiamoah failed to keep watch on the road. The Chief of Dormaa attacked Nana Obiri by surprise on a Sunday morning. Nana Obiri exchanged shields with the Chief of Dormaa. It was known in the olden days that shields and swords were used in battle. Nana Obiri was defeated and killed in battle with the king of Dormaa.

== Death ==
Nana Obiri Yeboah died in the battle against Dormaa.Kumasi, formally known as Kwamang. He was buried in an area close to present Adum fie in Adum. Where demised Asante kings and queens are temporarily laid to rest on their final rest at Breman .
