= Barekese Dam =

Dam in Ashanti, Ghana

- Location within Ghana
- Country: Ghana
- Location: Barekese, Kumasi, Ashanti Region
- Coordinates: 6°50′6.33″N 1°43′18.53″W
- Purpose: Municipal water supply
- Status: Operational
- Construction began: 1965
- Opening date: 1969
- Operator: Ghana Water and Sewerage Company

Dam and spillways
- Type of dam: Embankment and gravity composite
- Impounds: Ofin River
- Height (foundation): 21.5 m (71 ft)
- Height (thalweg): 18.5 m (61 ft)
- Length: 603 m (1,978 ft)
- Elevation at crest: 223.6 m (734 ft)
- Width (crest): 6 m (20 ft)

Reservoir
- Total capacity: 35,300,000 m^{3} (28,600 acre⋅ft)
- Catchment area: 909 km^{2} (351 mi^{2})
- Surface area: 6.4 km^{2} (2.5 mi^{2})
- Maximum length: 13 km (8.1 mi)
- Normal elevation: 220.9 m (725 ft)

Power Station
- Hydraulic head: 12 m (39 ft)
- Installed capacity: 400 kW

Barekese Dam is a dam on the Ofin River that supports the main water treatment plant for Kumasi in the Ashanti Region of Ghana, supplying about 80 percent of the potable water for the city and its surrounding environs. It is operated by the Ghana Water Company.

== History ==
The Dam was built by Ghana's first President, Dr. Kwame Nkrumah. It was started in 1965, and completed in June 1969 with the aim of providing both water and electricity to the people of Kumasi.
