= Nana Nkuah Okomdom II =

Ghanaian Sefwi Wiawso traditional ruler

Okogyeabour Nkuah Okomdom II (born Samuel Appiah Gyenin; 1951–2011) was a traditional ruler and Paramount chief of the Sefwi Wiawso Traditional Area in the Western Region of Ghana from 1997 to 2011.
