= Jukwa Senior High School =

Location
- Jukwaa; Ghana

Information
- Motto: Success means Hardwork
- Established: 1991
- Colour(s): Green and yellow

Jukwa Senior High School is a co-educational senior high school, located in Jukwaa in the Central Region of Ghana. It was established in 1991. The school motto is Success means Hardwork. The school's colours are green and yellow.

== History ==
A project to alleviate a lack of water at the school was completed in 2016.

== See also ==
- Education in Ghana
- List of senior high schools in Ghana
