= Nana Dokua =

Queen of Akyem Abuakwa

- Queen Mother of Akyem Abuakwa
- Reign: Early 19th century
- Born: Akyem Abuakwa, Chana
- Spouse: Barima Twua Ampofo
- Issue: Nana Atta; Obiwon
- Dynasty: Asona Clan
- Religion: Traditional African religion

Nana Dokua was the queen mother of Akyem Abuakwa. She was the one who welcomed the King of the Dwabens called Nana Kwaku Boateng and his army. A civil war broke out between the Ashantis and the Dwabens in 1832, six years after the battle of Akatamansu. In 1824, during her regime, she also provided refuge for the Kotokus who had also assisted Abuakwa in some wars against the Ashantis. During her reign, part of the Juabens revolted against the Ashantis. Nana Kwaku Boateng was the leader of the rebels who was their chief. They were forced to leave Juaben in Ashanti for the south.

== History of Akyem Abuakwa ==
The first King and Founder of Akyem Abuakwa was Nana Kunutunkununku I after the collapse of Adansi Kingdom and they broke away from the Kingdom. A number of Kings took accession to the throne.

== Legacies ==
It was claimed she was a woman who was the 24th Okyenhene to occupy the paramount stool. She was compared to Nana Yaa Asantewaa as the two were both of the same matrilineal Asona clan. Nana Dokua was both a heroine and a warrior as she fought 99 times against the Ashantis, protecting the Akyems from the attacks of the Ashantis. She is remembered for her feats in songs.

It is also claimed she was an administrator after setting up villages and towns in Akyem Abuakwa into divisions for war and administration purposes. Also avoiding break-ups and revolts in the kingdom.

== Personal life ==
She was married to Barima Twum Ampofo who was from the Oyoko clan of Barekeseso in the Ashanti region. She made him the Asiakwahene and also the Nifahene of Akyem Abuakwa. He became the only ''foreigner'' to hold that title of a Divisional chief in Akyem Abuakwa. They had two male sons who also became kings after her death called Nana Atta and Obiwom. A festival is celebrated in their honor called the Abam festival. It is celebrated each year on the first Friday after the Odwira festival by the paramount stool at Kyebi.
