= Bomfobiri Wildlife Sanctuary =

Park in Ghana

Coordinates: 6°54.595′0″N 1°17.340′0″W

Location of Bomfobiri Wildlife Sanctuary

Bomfobiri Wildlife Sanctuary is a bird sanctuary, located about 80 km northeast of Kumasi within a geographical coordinate of 06°54.595'N and 001°17.340'W. The 53 km^{2} Bomfobiri Wildlife Sanctuary was created in 1975 with a four distinct vegetative types such as Riverine Forest, Rainforest, Woodland Savannah and Grassland Savannah. Animals present on the reserve include several species of birds, crocodiles, baboons, Mona monkeys, buffalos, red river hogs, Maxwell's duiker, red flank duiker, Bushbuck and monitor lizards. The reserve has many forms of attraction point including the Lion Stone (a naturally carved stone resembling a lion), Stone Bridge, Bomfobiri waterfall (serving as a habitat for crocodiles), Wala waterfall (for swimming), and caves. Activities that can be engaged in includes hiking, mountain climbing, game viewing, bird watching, camping and swimming. The reserve takes the crocodile as its symbol.

The best time to see the animals at the Bomfobiri Wildlife sanctuary is during the month of November which is the dry season. This is because the rainy season drives the animals deep into the forest.

== Establishment and legal status ==
The Bomfobiri Wildlife Sanctuary was established to protect the varied ecosystem and ecological values of the area. The sanctuary was originally situated within the 16.8 km^{2} Boumfum Forest Reserve and established under the Ashanti Authority Ordinance on 23 March 1946. Bamfobiri Wildlife Sanctuary was expanded to its present size and re-designated as Bomfobiri Wildlife Sanctuary (BWS) by the Wildlife Reserves (Amendment) Regulation of 1975 L.I. 1022.
