= Jukwa =

- Town
- Country: Ghana
- Region: Central Region
- District: Twifo/Heman/Lower Denkyira District

Jukwa is a village in the Central region of Ghana. The village is known for the Jukwa Secondary School. The school is a second cycle institution.
