= Nana Kwaku Boateng =

Former Chief of New Juaben

Nana Kwaku Boateng I was the former Omanhene (Paramount Chief) of New Juaben (sometimes called Dwaben) from 1913 to 1930. He was one of the early rulers of the New Juaben State in the Eastern Region of present-day Ghana, following the migration and settlement of the Juaben/Dwaben people from Ashanti.

== History of New Juaben ==
New Juaben/Dwaben was established following the migration of the Juaben/Dwaben people from Asante after the Juaben/Dwaben rebellion of 1874–75. The migration followed a succession dispute after the death of Queen Nana Akua Sarpoma (Sapomaa). Historical accounts record that Agyei Twum, who later assumed the stool name Asafo Agyei (also known as Asafo Adjei), succeeded to the Juaben/Dwaben stool in a manner that departed from the customary Akan matrilineal system of succession. The resulting tensions with the Asante Confederacy culminated in the Dwaben rebellion and the migration from Asante.

During the migration, the daughters of Nana Akua Sarpoma, Akua Mansa Boatenmah and Afrakoma, played an important role in preserving the royal lineage. According to oral history, supported by information from published historical accounts, the two sisters exchanged responsibility for each other's children while fleeing Asante. Akua Mansa Boatenmah travelled with Afrakoma's son, Yaw Sarpong, while Afrakoma travelled with Ama Serwah, the daughter of Akua Mansa Boatenmah.

Following their arrival in the Eastern Region, the Juaben/Dwaben migrants settled in the area around present-day Koforidua. Historical sources state that land for the new settlement was granted by the Omanhene of Kukurantumi through negotiations involving the British colonial administration, leading to the establishment of the New Juaben State.

Ama Serwah had a son Nana Kwaku Boateng I, and she subsequently became the first Queen Mother of New Juaben. While her son, Nana Kwaku Boateng I, was still a minor, and following the absence of Chief Okyere, the chiefs of New Juaben elected Asafo Boateng as Head Chief and successfully petitioned the colonial government for his formal recognition as Omanhene in 1907 under the Chiefs' Ordinance of 1904. Nana Kwaku Boateng I was installed as Omanhene (Paramount Chief) of New Juaben (Dwaben) in 1913 and reigned till 1930.

== Personal life and legacy ==
Nana Kwaku Boateng I married several wives and had many children. His descendants include prominent figures in international public service, diplomacy, and global medicine. Among his sons were Prince Alfred Twumasi Ankrah Boateng, who studied administration at the University of Exeter and later served as Secretary of the New Juaben Council, and Prince Emmanuel Yao Boateng, who served as a prominent Ghanaian diplomat, working as Ghana's Ambassador to Japan and Brazil during the administration of Ghana’s first President, Dr. Kwame Nkrumah. In addition, Prince Emmanuel Yao Boateng also served as a Member of Parliament in the first Republican Parliament and also was the President of the Ghana Boxing Association, being instrumental in bringing Mohammed Ali to Ghana in the 1960s. Prince Alfred Twumasi Boateng, was the father of Mrs Irene Dadzie(née Miss Irene Doris Sarpomah Boateng). She married the United Nations diplomat, Mr Benjamin Dadzie, with whom she had five children, the youngest child being Dr. Ophelia E. Dadzie, a highly prominent UK consultant dermatologist and dermatopathologist, and an internationally recognised pioneer and leader in Skin of Colour Dermatology.
