= Ntim Gyakari =

Ruler of Denkyira

Ntim Gyakari (died in 1701) was the last fully independent ruler of Denkyira, a state in the boundaries of the modern nation of Ghana. He was the brother of Owusu Akoto who later took the family to the Ebrosa Kingdom as exile, which would eventually form a variation of the Agni dialect, Indenie-Djuablin.

One of his early actions was to increase his demands of tribute on his northern neighbors. These were led by Osei Tutu of Kumasi who was at that point a political prisoner in Denkyira, and Komfo Anokye. These forces began an insurrection against his rule.

Ntim Gyakari and his wife were killed at the Battle of Feyiase in 1701. This was after he had granted Osei Tutu pardon and released him from jail. He later thought of conquering the Asantes again so he led an army to do that. He is historically referred to, by some, as the king who gifted his land to his enemies due to his poor judgement call during the battle of Feyiase.

== Sources ==
- McCaskie, T. C. "Denkyira in the making of Asante" in The Journal of African History Vol. 48 (2007) no. 1, p. 3.
