= Ofin River =

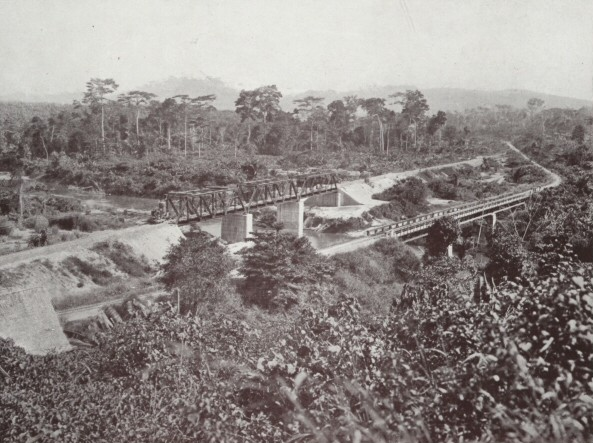
- Bridge over the Ofin River in 1925

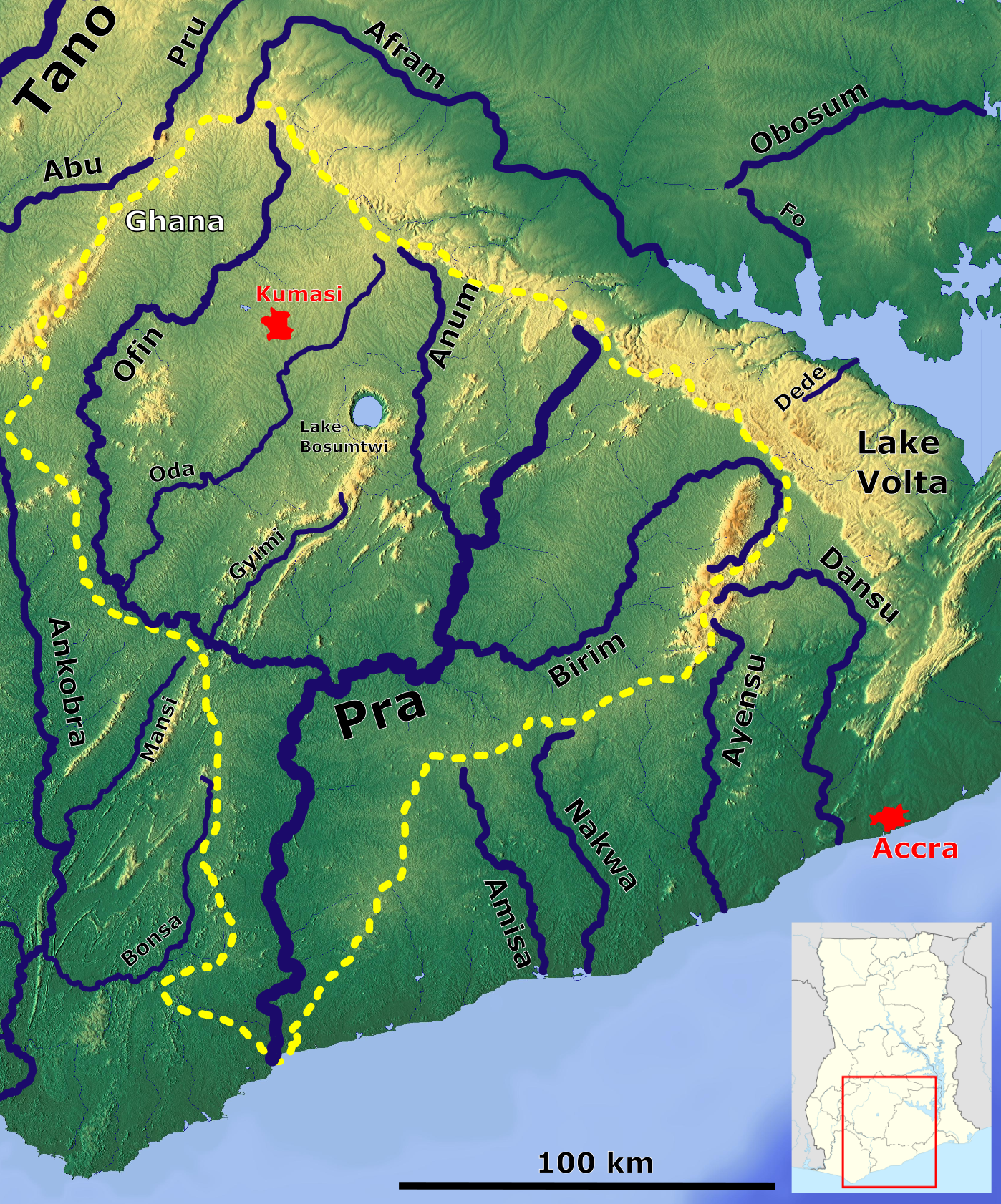
- South Ghana with the Ofin (left)

Location
- Country: Ghana

Physical characteristics
- Mouth: Pra River
  - coordinates: 6°40′0″N 2°10′0″W
- Length: 10 km (6.2 mi)
- Discharge
  - location: Mouth

The Ofin River is an easterly-flowing waterway in Ghana. It flows through the Tano Ofin Reserve in Ghana's Atwima Mponua District.

The Ofin riverbed is 90 metres above mean sea level. The Ofin has cut steep side channels, average depth 12–15 metres, into the rolling terrain over which it flows.

The Ofin and the Pra rivers form the boundary between Ghana's Ashanti region and Central region. Dunkwa-on-Offin is a major town on the river.

Gold is mined from the river's sediment.

== Fauna ==
Native species include the clarias agboyiensis, a benign type of airbreathing catfish. The Barekese Dam is located on its course.

== Tributaries ==
- Gyimi River

== See also ==
- Geology of Ghana
