= Okomfo Anokye =

Priest and founder of the Ashanti Empire

Priest (Okomfo) of the Ashanti Empire
- Born: c.1655 Awukugua
- Died: c.1717?/c.1719 (aged around 62-64); Ghana

Okomfo Anokye (c.1655 – c.1717?/c.1719) was the first priest (Okomfo) of the Ashanti Empire. Anokye is known for his participation in the expansion of the empire. He was also the codifier of the constitution and laws of the Ashanti Empire.

== Biography ==
=== Origins and early life ===
Okomfo Anokye was born in Ghana around 1655. According to Akuapem tradition, he was son of Ano and Yaa Anubea, both from Awukugua in the Nifa Division of the Okere state. His name originated from the following incident:

It is said that when Okomfo Anokye was born in Awukugua he was already holding in his right hand a short white tail of a cow (Podua); and he had so firmly clenched the fist of the other hand that no one could open it. The woman who went to deliver the labouring mother tried to open it because she suspected there was something in it. The father was called in to assist... Okomfo Anokye opened his eyes and, staring at the father, quickly opened the mysterious hand, showing it to the father and saying "Ano....Kye" (Guan language) meaning "Ano...see" and gave to the father what was in it. It is alleged that it was a talisman. From this incident Kwame Agyei got his name "Anokye". Okomfo Anokye, his original name Kwame Anokye Frimpon Kotobre.

— Amos Anti, Akwamu, Denkyira, Akuapem, and Ashanti in the Lives of Osei Tutu and Okomfo Anokye (1971)

During his birth in Awukugua, it is said he brought with him gifts from the gods; totem poles which were firmly clinched to his palms that no one could open it; and in the other hand already was a short, white tail of a cow (Podua).

This claim was apparently later confirmed by Otumfuo Nana Osei Tutu II during his visit at Awukugua in 2014.

=== Founding of the Ashanti Empire ===
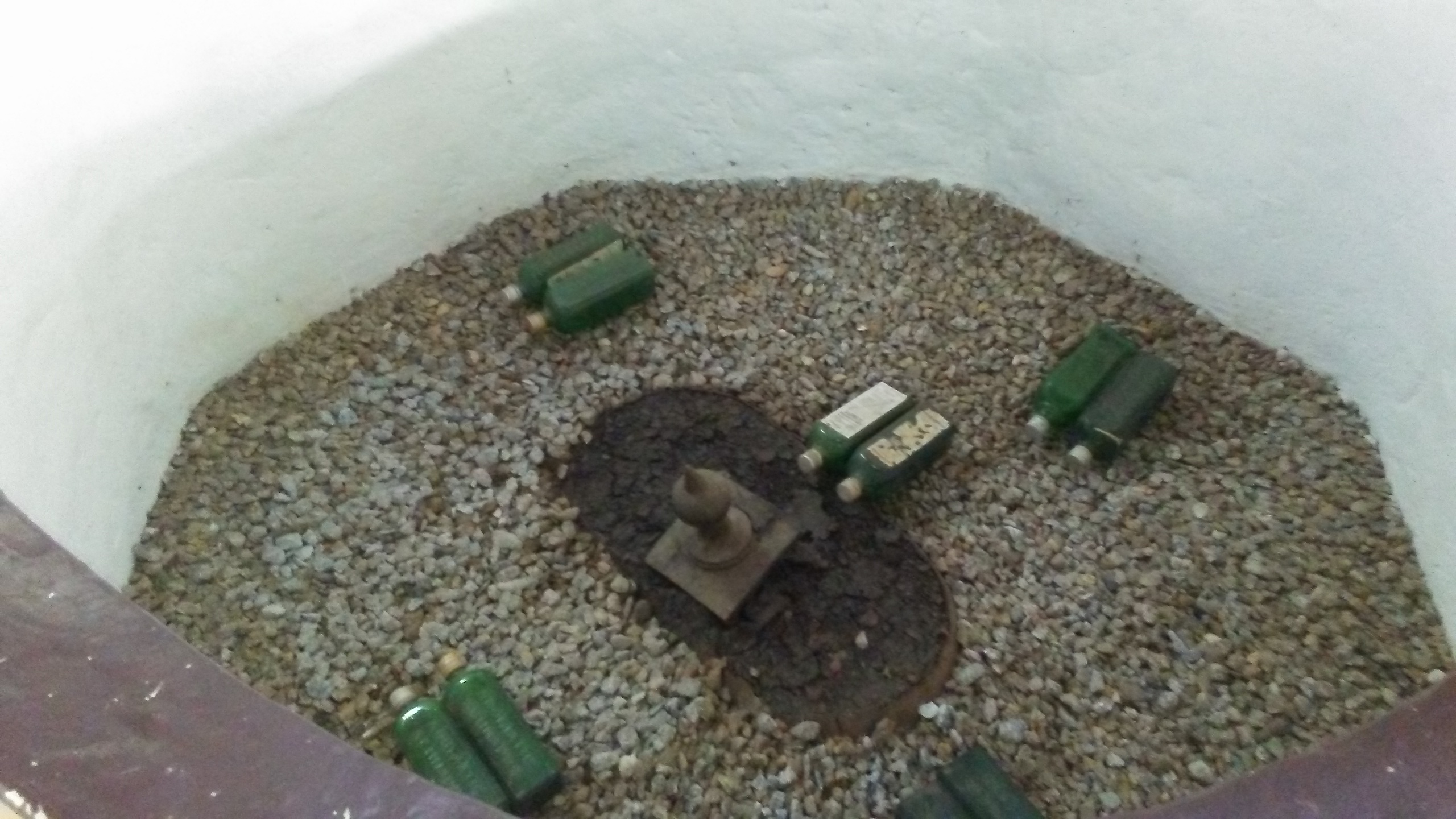
The Okomfo Anokye sword site, which is legendary site of the foundation of the Ashanti Empire in Kumasi in 1701

When Osei Kofi Tutu I succeeded to the throne of the Kumaseman State between c.1680 and c.1695 (exact year unknown; although he was definitely Kumasehene by 1695) to the leadership of the small group of Akan forest states around the city of Kumasi, which were already grouped in a loose military alliance, Anokye was his adviser and chief priest. Tutu and Anokye, who must be considered together, carried out the expansionist policy of their predecessors, defeating two powerful enemies, the Akan Domaa to the northwest and the Denkyera empire to the south.

The Ashanti conquered large parts of Ghana during the 17th century by overthrowing their powerful overlords, the Denkyira. Okomfo Anokye was essentially a cleric who served to rally the people to the cause of his friend the king. Anokye is also said to have placed a dagger in the middle of the Ashanti region, which the Europeans have not been able to take out with any type of technology for over 500 years.

=== Miracles of Okomfo Anokye ===
Okomfo Anokye is said to have commanded down a golden stool named "Sika Dwa Kofi" from the sky during a durbar in the Ashanti empire, This stool is said to have fallen on the then King of the Ashante Osei Tutu I.

It is believed he planted an Unremovable sword in the grounds in Kumasi where to this day none has been able to remove it, this sword is located in the Komfo Anokye teaching hospital.

=== Unification of the Ashanti people ===
To throw off the Denkyira yoke required a powerful unity that transcended the particularism of the Ashanti segments, and Anokye employed not only the political influence of his priesthood but also the spiritual ties it engendered to transform the loose Ashanti alliance into a "national" union in 1695.

Anokye and Tutu established rituals and customs of the Ashanti state to diminish the influence of local traditions. They designated Kumasi, the Ashanti capital. They then established a state council of the chiefs of the preexisting states admitted to the union and suppressed all competing traditions of origin. Finally, they reorganized the Ashanti army.

=== War with the Denkyira ===
The War with Denkyira (1699–1701) did not go well at first, but when the Denkyira army reached the gates of [Kumasi], Anokye's incantations produced defections among their generals. The Ashanti broke the Denkyira hegemony and captured the Dutch deed of rent for Elmina Castle. This gave the traders of the empire access to the African coast and involved them henceforth in the commerce and politics of the coastal slave trade.

According to legend, a kola tree in Feyiase grew from a seed spat by Anokye, at the site of the Battle of Feyiase against the Denkyira. The tree became locally popular and was believed to have healing powers and was a tourist attraction. It was cut down in 2023, sparking outrage and a search for the culprit.

=== Death ===
After Osei Tutu's death in 1717, Anokye is said to have returned to Akuapim and died at town called Kyirapatre in Kumasi between 1717 and 1719 (aged between 62 and 64). The real cause of his death is not known and it is said that he was going to bring the key to death so no one would die again - and so no one should cry; if anyone is heard crying he will never return. After a couple of days he still was not back and so the women cried, and he never returned. According to another tradition, Anokye went into a trance and never woke up. He was mourned by his loving wife Bukyia Mansa. But latest research has shown that throughout his life Anokye suffered asthma and this might have been the cause of his death. He died in his sleep in 1719 at the age of about 64.
