= Battle of Feyiase =

1701 battle between Denkyira and the Ashanti

Date	August, 1701
Location	Feyiase, Ghana, West Africa
Result	Asante victory; Fall of Denkyira kingdom and establishment of Asante Union

Belligerents
Ashanti Empire	Kingdom of Denkyira

Commanders and leaders
Asantehene Osei Tutu	Denkyirahene Ntim Gyakari

The Battle of Feyiase was the decisive battle in the struggle that led to the Ashanti Empire replacing Denkyira as the dominant power among the Twi-speaking Akan peoples.

During the battle, the Denkyira army deployed 2 or 3 Dutch cannons while the Ashanti had limited access to firearms. Prior to this battle the Denkyirahene Ntim Gyakari believed he was doing well in the war, having driven the Ashanti forces from Adunku, Abuontem and Aputuogya. However, this was all part of Osei Tutu's plan to ambush the Denkyira troops at Feyiase.

At Feyiase, the full force of the Asante fell upon the Denkyiran army, and they were routed. Ntim Gyakari was killed by the people of Adunku from Asante Feyiase and Denkyira's cannons were captured by the Ashanti. Denkyira's hegemony was broken at Feyiase Akoyem. Feyiase Akoyem is now a part of Bosomtwe District which lies between Aputuogya and Esereso where the war ended.
