= Pra River (Ghana) =

River in Ghana

Coordinates: 5.01913°N 1.62598°W

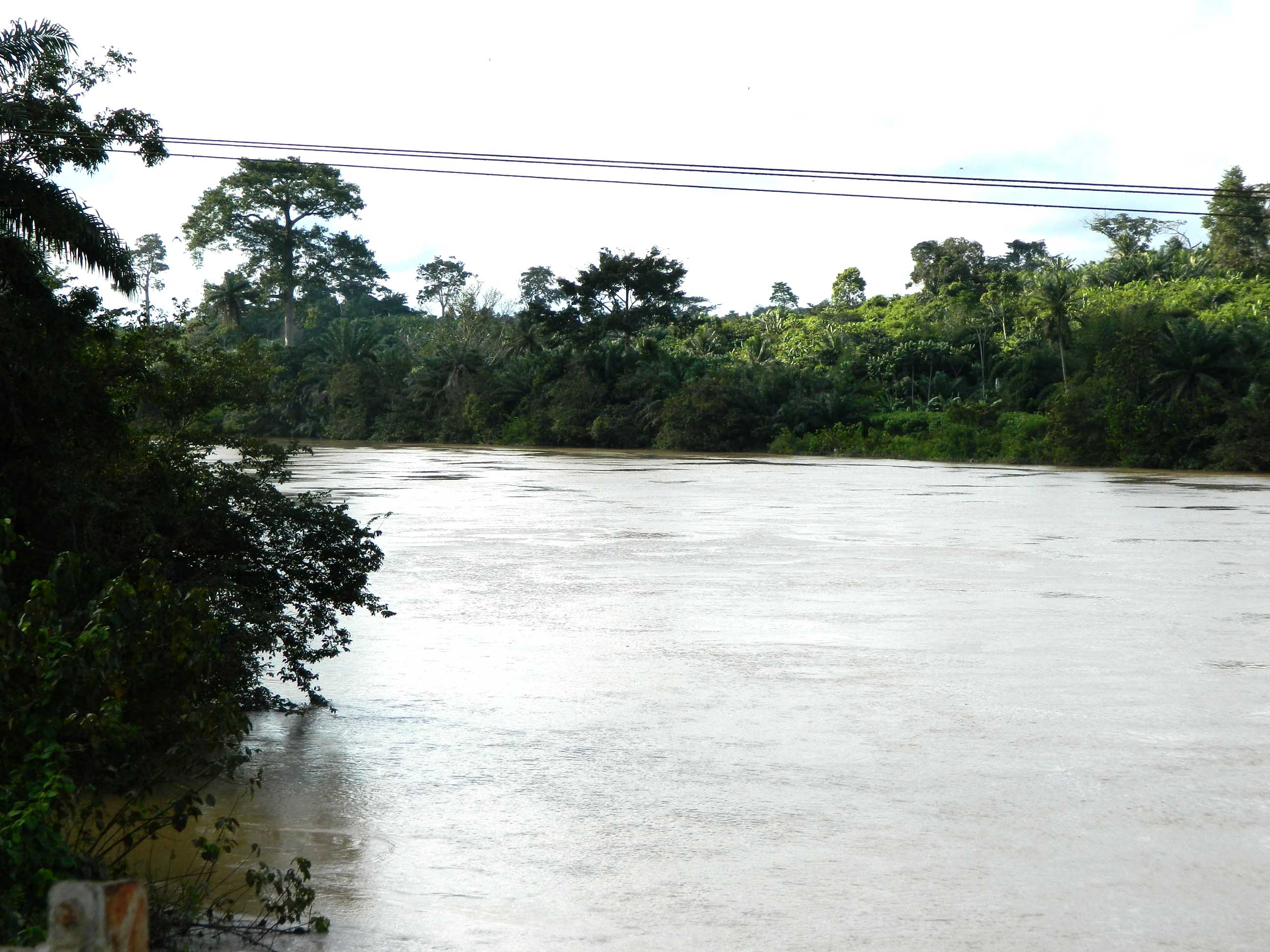

- Pra River and major tributaries

Physical characteristics
- Length: 240 km (150 mi)

The Pra River is a river in Ghana, It is the easternmost and the largest of the three principal rivers that drain the area south of the Volta divide. Rising in the Kwahu Plateau near Mpraeso and flowing 240 km (149.129 mi) southward through rich cocoa and farming areas and valuable forests in the Akan lowlands. The Pra enters the Gulf of Guinea east of Takoradi. In the 19th century, the Pra served as the border between the Ashanti Confederacy and the Gold Coast.

The Pra has many cataracts, notably the Bosomasi Rapids at Anyinabrim, and most of its length is not navigable even by canoe. However, in the early part of the twentieth century the Pra was used extensively to float timber to the coast for export. This trade is now carried by road and rail transportation. The main tributaries are the Ofin, Anum and Birim rivers. The northern part of the Pra is still worked for artisan gold with metallic mercury, which has caused some contamination. The Birim river valley is a major source of diamonds.

== Tributaries and Physical Characteristics ==
The main tributaries of the Pra River include the Ofin, Birim, Anum, and Oda rivers.

The river is characterized by rapids and cataracts, which make navigation difficult along most of its course.

Its basin includes diverse landscapes such as forest zones, agricultural lands, and mineral-rich areas.

== Environmental Issues and Pollution ==
The Pra River is heavily affected by illegal small-scale mining activities (galamsey), which introduce mercury and sediments into the water system.

Studies show that water quality in many parts of the basin exceeds WHO limits for parameters such as iron and lead contamination.

== Climate and Hydrological Challenges ==
The Pra Basin is experiencing increasing climate variability, including higher temperatures and more extreme rainfall events.

These changes increase risks of flooding, drought stress, and water insecurity across the basin.

Hydrological studies show that land-use change significantly affects runoff and water balance in the basin.

Akim Oda is the commercial centre of the northern Pra basin.
