= Nana Oti Akenten =

Asante monarch

Nana Oti Akenten (ruled from 1630 – 1660) was the ruler of the Asante Oyoko clan which occupied parts of what is now Ghana. Nana Oti was the brother of Nana Kobia Antwi and their mother was Antwiwaa Nyame. Nana Oti sent his hunter called Bofoo Nyame on a trip and he discovered that the Agona family has already settled in a place called Kwaebrem which was later called Kwaabre. When the hunter learned that the area was productive, he went to tell Nana Oti. The settlement was then given the name Kumasi after the monarch, his family, and some of his followers opted to purchase that portion of the land from Agonaba Obaapanyin Adwoa Wiri. It was under his regime that a series of military operations against other Akan states came into alliance with the Ashanti. During his reign, there was a trend towards Ashanti military unification.
