= Boamponsem =

Ruler of Denkyira

Boamponsem (died 1694) was a Denkyirahene from the 1650s until his death in 1694.

In 1692, Boamponsem sent an envoy to the Gold Coast to engage with the newly encamped Dutch and English trading posts and military installations, to gather intelligence, trade, and advocate his people's interests.

Boamponsem is remembered by European observers and in Denkyiran tradition as a successful but autocratic ruler.

Boamponsem was named after the Boa Amponsem Senior High School in Dunkwa-on-Offin.

== Sources ==
- McKaskie, T. C. "Denkyira in the Making of Asante" in The Journal of African History Vol. 48 (2007) no. 1, p. 1-2
