= Old Akyem =

Pre-colonial Akan polity in Ghana

Akyem Kingdoms
- 16th–17th century
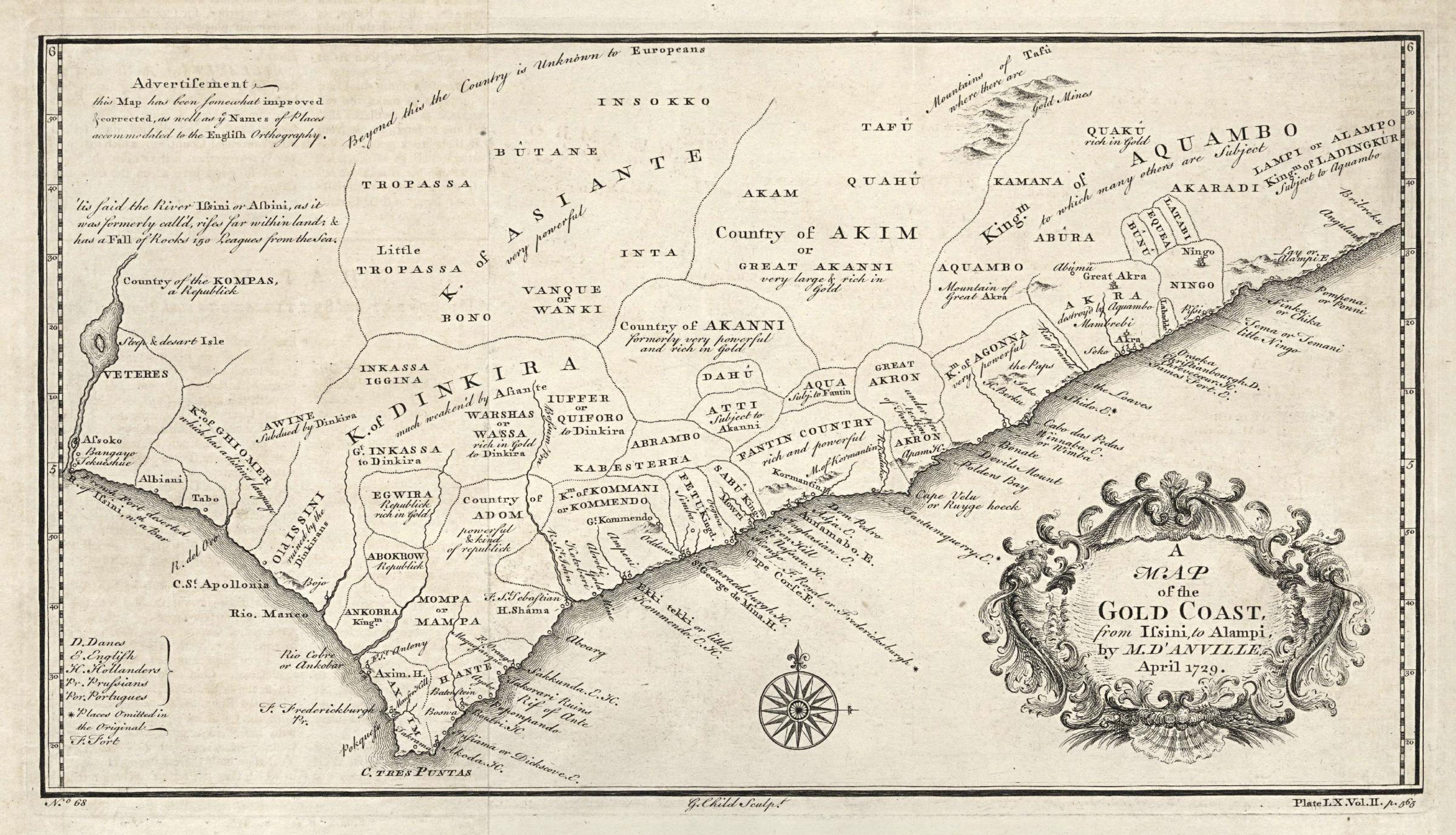
- D'Anville's 1729 map recognizing "Great Akani" (Akyem) as a major polity on the Gold Coast
- Status: Former Akan polity
- Capital: Banso; Anum; Kyebi(1730s)
- Common languages: Twi
- Religion: Akan religion,
- Government: Monarchy (Earlier); Oligarchy(Later)
- Omanhene
- History
  - Early European contact: 16th–17th century
  - "Akim" or "Great Accany" listed on 1629 Dutch Map of the Gold Coast: 1629
  - No longer Monarchy, power shared among rulers: 1680s
  - Shared leadership under three principal rulers: Late 17th century
  - Arrival of the Agona leadership under Ofosu Apenten from Denkyira: 1699-1701
  - Participation in the Denkyira–Asante war: 1699–1702
  - Death of Ofosu Apenten and Asantehene Osei Tutu I in Asante-Akyem War: 1717
  - Defeat of the Akwamu state: c. 1730
  - Asante Invasion, Akyem defeated in conflict: mid–late 18th century
  - Emergence of Akyem Abuakwa and Kotoku: mid–late 18th century
Preceded by	Succeeded by
Adanse	Akyem Abuakwa; Akyem Kotoku
- Today part of: Ghana

Old Akyem (also known as Akim, Great Akanni, Groot Acanij, Acanes Castelhanos, or Acanes Grande) was a large Akan polity located in the forest zone of southeastern Ghana. It occupied a strategic position between the Pra and Anum river and was connected to regional gold production, agriculture, and long-distance trade networks.

Akyem was one of the most powerful inland polities in the Pra–Ofin basin, before wars with the Akwamu and Asante reshaped the polity and led to the emergence of Abuakwa and Kotoku.

== History ==
=== Origins ===
Akyem oral traditions trace their origins to Adanse, the Akan homeland and source of early social and political organization. From Adanse, migrant groups moved east into the Pra basin, where settlers included groups involved in early gold mining and the group that later formed the Asona ruling lineage of Akyem Abuakwa. Early communities were organized through matrilineal clans, with leadership tied to stools representing the authority of a lineage (abusua) over land, settlement, and political office. Gold production connected Akyem to regional and long-distance Akan trade networks.

=== Expansion of Old Akyem ===
By the sixteenth and early seventeenth centuries, settlements across the Akyem area became more organized. Population growth increased pressure on settlement space, leading to more structured management of land rights by clan leaders. By the early seventeenth century, a broader Akyem territorial identity was visible to European traders.

=== Arcania and the Accanists ===
In 1629, a Dutch map identified the Akyem territory as "Akim", or "Great Acani." During this period, the Akyem occupied a strategic position between the Denkyira and the Akwamu, two expanding imperial Akan states. Around 1675, Heerman Abramsz reported that "Akimse Akkanists" as an inland people settled north of Accra. By the end of the seventeenth century, the polity was recognized as a major inland state in the southern Akan forest region, initially described in European accounts as being ruled by a single king. Jean Barbot and Willem Bosman later recorded that authority had shifted toward a commonwealth, with power shared among leading men.

=== Arrival of the Agona clan ===
Before 1699–1701, members of the Agona clan led by Ofosu Apenten migrated eastward from Denkyira and settled by Anum River, bordering Old Akyem. The stool carried by Apenten, known as the Denkyira-Mmerayam, later became the paramount seat of Akyem Kotoku.

=== Conflicts with Akwamu ===
According to J. K. Fynn, relations between Denkyira, Akyem, and Akwamu were based on rivalry and recurring hostility, driven by competition over gold, ivory, kola nuts, and slaves in the Gold Coast interior. Akwamu forces carried out repeated raids on neighboring states, including Akyem, which frequently led to warfare and disrupted farming, trade, and security in frontier settlements. Fynn notes that Akyem and Denkyira at times acted together against Akwamu, as Denkyira regarded Akyem as a sister state and shared its opposition to Akwamu's control of inland trade routes to the coast. According to Ivor Wilks, Akwamu's expansion was directed eastward and north-eastward because its western frontier was blocked by the military strength of Akyem. Akyem was in continuous battles with Akwamu over access to trade because Akwamu controlled inland routes and blocked Akyem traders from traveling south to the coast. European observers reported that the restrictions varied depending on Akwamu's political and military situation. When Akwamu was at peace, access to the coast was tightly controlled, but when Akwamu was engaged in warfare elsewhere, Akyem traders were sometimes allowed to pass. During periods of direct tension or fighting, trade through Akwamu-controlled territory was halted completely. Akwamu also attempted to block Akyem access to firearms and gunpowder, but despite these efforts Akyem forces remained well armed and militarily active. Pressure from Akyem influenced Akwamu's foreign policy, leading Ansa Sasraku, the Akwamuhene, to support Osei Tutu during the early formation of the Asante Union and to weaken cooperation between Denkyira and Akyem. According to Asante and Denkyira traditions, Osei Tutu received protection from the Akwamu court while shaping his early policies.

=== War with Asante and tensions with Akani ===
During the Denkyira–Asante wars of 1699–1701, Akyem fought alongside Denkyira.The alliance was formed due to tensions with Akani groups from Adanse and Assin over control of gold mining and trade that had been developing since the 1660s, as well as their alignment with Asante. These tensions placed Akyem in direct rivalry with Assin, as both competed for inland trade and access to the coast and later fought on opposing sides during the Asante–Denkyira conflict. In 1701, Denkyira was defeated, and Akyem forces suffered heavy casualties. Bosman estimated the losses at around 30,000, although the figure is considered exaggerated. The defeat marked a turning point, as Asante continued to expand in the region. In 1702, the Denkyira–Akyem alliance achieved a temporary success, but it did not halt Asante's continued expansion. In 1706, armed groups operating from Denkyira prevented Asante traders from passing through Akyem territory to the coast. Dutch officials noted that continued unrest made travel unsafe, leading to soldiers being stationed to protect traders moving through Akyem. After Denkyira rebelled against Asante, Akyem provided protection to Denkyira leaders and their followers. By 1712, Akyem had taken direct action against Asante and supported displaced rulers opposed to Asante authority. Dutch observers believed that an Asante invasion of Akyem would severely disrupt trade because Akyem was regarded as an important source of gold.

=== Tensions with Akwamu, Agona, and the coastal states ===
Between 1713 and 1715, Asante prepared for conflict with Akyem by seeking access to firearms, while Akyem attempted to secure weapons and trade access through negotiations with the Agona king Nyarko Eku, whose territory allowed passage to Winneba, Apam, and Senya Bereku. In 1715, Ofori of Akyem paid £800 to secure passage through Akwamu territory. When Akyem sought an alternative route through Agona, similar excessive demands were made. At the time, the Agona were allies of Akwamu, and Nyarko Eku and his chiefs refused Akyem's request. In April 1715, Assin fled with their population to Kabestera, followed by reports of a possible Akyem attack. Before the situation was confirmed, the Fante decided to support Assin, mainly because they feared Akyem would attack them next.During the crisis of 1715, Akyem leaders met with Fante chiefs at Abora and assured them that Akyem would not attack Assin or Fante territory. Akyem warned that any attack on Assin would be treated as an attack on Akyem and allowed Assin to pass safely through its territory.

After negotiations failed, Akyem took military action and in October 1715 decided to fight Agona and Akwamu. By early 1716, Akyem forces were engaged in conflicts against Agona and Akwamu with assistance from Fante allies. Akyem traders arriving at the Dutch post at Crevecoeur reported that "the Akim Caboceer Apintin thinks himself strong enough to fight the Zaay of Asjanjih." In December 1715, reports from Axim stated that Amankwatia's troops and Wassa forces were called to Kumasi because "the Zaay have summoned them very urgently as the Akims are threatening the Zaay with a decisive battle."In 1716, reports from Komenda stated that the Asante ruler had taken the field with much of his army, supported by Wassa. Early in 1717, British officials at Cape Coast reported that Asante and Akyem were resolved on war with each other, and by September 1717 a decisive battle was widely expected.

=== Second war with Asante, death of Osei Tutu I ===
The built up hostility led to another war in 1717, where Osei Tutu I, the king of Asante, was killed and his skull was taken. During the same conflict, Apenten, one of the three rulers of Akyem, was also killed. According to Dutch reports, the Asante campaign failed after Akonno, the Akwamuhene, advised Osei Tutu to move part of the army through Akwamu territory in order to attack the Akyem from an unexpected direction. Akonno then informed the Akyem of the route the Asante forces were taking, and the Asante army was surrounded and ambushed. In the early 1720s, Opoku Ware, the successor of Osei Tutu, carried out a successful retaliatory expedition against Akyem. As relations between Akwamu and Asante declined, a temporary peace agreement was made between Asante and Akyem, allowing Akyem to prepare for war against Akwamu without interference.

=== Akyem-Akwamu War ===
By the late 1720s, internal divisions within the Akwamu ruling group weakened the state. In 1730, Akyem forces joined Akwamu homeland and provincial rebels in a coordinated attack that led to the overthrow of Akwamu. The defeat of Akwamu ended its dominance over the southeastern Gold Coast and removed its control over inland access to the coast. According to J.K. Fynn, the Akyem victory was "one of the most decisive victories in Gold Coast history", describing it as a revolution that overturned decades of Akwamu hegemony. Following the collapse of Akwamu, Akyem settlers moved in large numbers into former Akwamu territory. The three leaders, Frempong Manso, Bakwante, and Owusu, who had led the victory, shared power and administrative responsibilities almost equally after the war. Governance of the conquered areas was carried out indirectly, with authority exercised through defeated Akwamu officials rather than through direct rule.Through control of Accra and the Adangbe districts, the Akyem rulers received consistent payments from European forts and settlements which strengthened their military and economic position. According to Fynn, the growth of Akyem's power alarmed Asante, who believed there was a shift in the political balance in the southern Gold Coast. Akyem later blocked Asante access to firearms from the coast while preparing for renewed conflict.

=== Passing of Old Akyem ===
After 1730, many Akyem settlers established new towns in the former Akwamu homeland, while others remained. The groups that stayed were tied to gold mining areas in the Old Akyem homeland, while others moved into former Akwamu territory to take advantage of new land and opportunities. Over time the physical separation created existing differences and led to growing political divisions. Akyem leaders anticipated a possible Asante invasion and directed their efforts toward defending the territory of the state, however, the unity within Akyem weakened. Ba Kwante wanted exclusive control over Accra and the Adangbe district rather than sharing with Frempong Manso. To secure exclusive control over Accra, Ba Kwante demanded and received rent from Christiansborg Castle, which had previously been paid to Frempong Manso. In February 1733, Danish records noted that a monthly ground rent of two rix dollars was being paid to Ba Kwante and that twenty-two months' rent had already been advanced because "Frempung has surrendered his monthly custom to Bang Qvantijn." The disputes contributed to the breakdown of relations between the factions and resulted in civil war in Akyem. In 1737, Danish reports described Akyem as being in a "very disturbed state" due to fighting between "Frempungs and Bangs people." The infighting stopped when a renewed threat of an Asante invasion emerged. In March 1739, reports noted that a palaver was held between Akyem and Asante. At the same time, Akwamu groups who had resettled east of the Volta River claimed that Opoku Ware would grant them Accra after an Asante victory over Akyem. In anticipation of the invasion, Akwamu bands were causing instability. They were reported to be operating around Accra and seizing inhabitants, such that "the Accra people were obliged to go armed whenever they went to fetch water." By about 1740, Akyem traders traveling to Accra and the neighboring beaches requested only guns and gunpowder to prepare for war.

=== Opoku Ware's invasion and the partition of Old Akyem ===
In 1742, Opoku Ware of Asante launched a major attack on the Akyem states. Frimpong Manso's successor, Apau, and Owusu Akyem were killed in the war. Bakwante was captured and later committed suicide. After the defeat of Akyem, Asante intervened directly in Akyem succession. Captured heirs were installed as rulers under Asante authority, while one of the ruling stools lost legitimacy and was eliminated. The intervention ended the Old Akyem political system and left the Akyem factions as separate states. From the late 1740s, resistance to Asante was strongest in the new Akyem settlements, which were farther from Asante control. The Old Akyem homeland was less openly hostile and often aligned with Asante interests. Five years after the 1742 war, some Akyem groups rejected Asante overlordship and sought refuge in Fante, Kwahu, and Little Popo. The refugees entered alliances with Fante and Wassa against Asante by limiting access to firearms from the coast. By the mid-1750s, clear territorial divisions had developed within Akyem, with different areas aligning with different leaders. Kusi Obodom, Opoku Ware's successor, claimed that part of Akyem had accepted Asante authority, especially areas near the Pra and Anum rivers that were surrounded by Asante territory and no longer viable bases for resistance. By the mid-18th century, these areas were effectively under Asante influence. Between 1754 and 1758, he sought to formalize the situation through peace deals, claiming that half of Akyem was under his protection and demanded the remaining allied districts like Wassa, Denkira, Twifo, and Akyem, to recognize his authority. By 1758, Dutch reports show that Akyem no longer acted as a single political unit but as separate districts.

=== Abuakwa and the anti-Asante alliance ===
After the split of Akyem in the mid-18th century, one portion became openly anti-Asante while another accepted Asante authority and was ruled by an Asante-imposed leader. The anti-Asante side was led by Pobi Asomanin, who continued resistance through alliances with Wassa and others from the late 1740s, but he was killed after Asante defeated Akyem forces in 1765. His successor, Obirikoran, was installed by Asante and ruled from former Akwamu territory. Fighting resumed between 1767 and 1772, after which a large Asante army forced Obirikoran to retreat eastward and later into exile, where he died in 1780. His successor, Twum Ampofo, was not allowed to return to Old Akyem and instead remained in former Akwamu lands, where a new Abuakwa capital was established at Kyebi. By this time, Old Akyem had fully disappeared as a political entity.

=== Battle of Atakpame ===
In 1764, the Akyem, alongside their allies from Fante, Dahomey, and the Oyo Empire, formed a military coalition to resist Asante expansion in the southeast. The tension lead to the Battle of Atakpamé, where the Asante army, led by Dankwa (Dwabenhene), suffered a catastrophic defeat. The defeat undermined the authority of Asantehene Kusi Obodum and he was remove from power. Osei Kwadwo succeeded the throne right after and defeated the Akyem the following year in 1765, which reopened eastern trade routes to Accra.

== Divisions ==
According to Ray Kea's analysis, Akyem in the seventeenth and early eighteenth centuries was a highly urbanized polity before conflicts in the 1740s decreased its population. It was a dense network of permanent towns rather than rural settlements with a population of Akyem is estimated at more than 120,000 and as high as 200,000. Kea estimates that Akyem contained approximately seventeen urban settlements, each with an average population of around 4,000 inhabitants, and when taken together, the towns would have housed more than 70,000 people.

=== Akyem Abuakwa ===
Leadership in Akyem Abuakwa was held by the Asona clan, an early clan that migrated from Adanse and settled in the Akyem area, where it controlled the paramount stool. During the eighteenth century, Akyem Abuakwa emerged from the eastern portion of Old Akyem as settlers moved into former Akwamu territory. The settlers established new towns and gained control over land, trade routes, and later the Akwapim hills.

=== Akyem Kotoku ===
Akyem Kotoku traditions trace their origins to Denkyira. Their leader, Ofosu Apenten of the Agona clan, brought the Denkyira-Mmerayam stool along with his followers into the Akyem area, forming the basis of Kotoku political authority. Akyem Kotoku developed from groups that remained closer to the Old Akyem homeland and areas that were tied to earlier gold production and established settlements. Kotoku leadership retained stronger connections to the Old Akyem territory. As political divisions hardened after the 1740s, Kotoku increasingly followed a separate political path from Abuakwa.

== Government ==
=== Seventeenth century ===
Before the late seventeenth century, European observers described Akyem as a monarchy that later underwent changes in its system of government. By the 1680s, authority had shifted away from centralized kingship toward a form of collective rule exercised by senior officeholders. Akyem's system of government developed into a structure where authority was shared between three rulers. The Denkyira-Mmerayam stool, associated with the Agona clan, was incorporated into the political order. After its integration, the stool held a position of high rank within Akyem and formed one of the three major centers of authority that governed the state collectively.

=== Eighteenth century ===
Frempong Manso succeeded Ofosu Apenten in 1717, while Bakwante succeeded Ofori Panin in 1727. The third ruler, Owusu held office alongside them by 1729, but the identity of his predecessor is not specified in sources.

== Society ==
Akyem was part of a group of inland Akan states whose towns functioned as formal political and administrative centers. By the mid-sixteenth century, Akyem was organized as a city-state, with a capital and subordinate towns and villages integrated through a layered administrative hierarchy. The towns served as population centers and seats of authority where political, judicial, and fiscal functions were carried out.

== Military ==
Akyem military organization followed the same structure as Akwamu and Denkyira. Forces were divided into three main divisions: the center (adonten), left wing (benkum), and right wing (nifa). Firearms were the primary weapons used by the Akyem military. Despite restrictions imposed by Akwamu, the Akyem maintained a well-armed fighting force.

== Economy ==
According to Ray Kea, state revenue in Akyem was primarily from agricultural produce and labor services rather than monetary taxation. In the city-states of the Pra-Ofin basin, including Akyem, taxes and obligations were largely extracted in kind, and peasant agricultural production was not heavily monetized. During the first half of the seventeenth century, Kea notes that slave labor, rather than peasant production, became the decisive element in the economic and fiscal organization of these states.

=== Trade activity ===
Akyem was part of a long-established inland trade system linking the forest, the savanna, and the coast. Markets like Abonse were major subregional centers, supplying and connecting trade with Great Accra and drawing traders from nearby Akan states. Trade at the markets was managed by appointed officials who fixed prices, settled disputes, and controlled trade routes. According to Daaku, European traders supplied goods like green and yellowish cloth favored by Asante and Akyem buyers. When war disrupted access to Akyem, inland trade slowed and coastal merchants were unable to sell their goods despite having large stocks. European officials recognized that trade depended on maintaining good relations with Akyem and other powerful inland states, and they often used gifts, payments, and favorable treatment to secure cooperation and access to trade routes.

=== Gold production ===
From 1675 to 1730, gold and slaves remained the primary sources of wealth in Akyem. European merchants operating on the coast around 1700 consistently identified Akyem as a major inland supplier of gold. Akyem was identified alongside Denkyira as one of the primary sources of gold in the Gold Coast interior. A Danish contact named Erich Tilleman, recorded that most gold reaching Accra came from Acania, west and northwest of Akwamu. Willem Bosman stated that Akyem produced large quantities of gold comparable to any other gold-producing region on the coast.

=== Gold extraction ===
Numerous gold pits in Akyem were worked by slave labor. Kea explains that slave labor was the main workforce in gold mining. In places such as Akyem, Kaase, and Kwabre, enslaved people did most of the work in the gold fields. The system was regulated by rulers who granted mining lands to wealthy elites (abirempon). Elites treated both the mines and enslaved laborers as private and inheritable property. Ludwig Römer recorded that a mine pit 20 to 30 feet deep required a minimum workforce of forty people, while deeper pits of 70 to 100 feet could employ one hundred workers or more. Labor was divided into specialized groups of miners, fillers, carriers, and crushers and washers, each operating under an overseer. Kea notes that both free and enslaved producers employed the same mining techniques and organizational structure.

=== Food exports ===
According to Ray Kea, the value of gold exports from Akyem was relatively small when compared to the scale of its internal food economy. Kea notes that during the 1640s–1670s, the combined gold exports of Akyem and Accra were worth 24,000 weekly (1,000 rigsdaler) and 1,248,000 dambas per year.

== Interpretations ==
=== K.Y. Daaku ===
Daaku treats Akyem as a single polity with shared leadership under Abuakwa and Kotoku until 1715. He notes that Ofosuhene Apenten of Akyem Kotoku and Ofori of Akyem Abuakwa had earlier internal disagreements but later set these aside. Acting together, they united their forces and planned a joint attack on Akwamu and Agona in 1715 in order to end trade restrictions and gain direct access to the coast.

=== David Kiyaga-Mulindwa ===
Kiyaga-Mulindwa argues that the "Akim" or "Great Akanij" shown on the 1629 map refers to an earlier Akan polity, and that later states such as Akyem Abuakwa and Akyem Kotoku should not be placed back onto that map, even if they later occupied the same area. He criticizes Adu Boahen and Daaku for equating "Great Akanij" on the 1629 map with Akyem Abuakwa, arguing that it ignores Abuakwa's own oral traditions, which place the migration of the Asona ruling dynasty from Adanse Kokobiante into the Akyem region only after the defeat of Adanse by Denkyira in the late seventeenth century. He also rejects Boahen's identification of the "Akan" shown north of Great Akanij with Akyem Kotoku. According to Kiyaga-Mulindwa, the identification depends on the assumption that Abramsz misheard the name "Kotoku," or its variant "Kwadukro," and rendered it as "Cocoriteese," even though there is no clear linguistic similarity between these names. He further notes that Akyem Kotoku's present location dates only to about 1865, that the Kotoku stayed only briefly at Gyadam in Akyem Abuakwa, and that their movement into the Asante Akyem area occurred later, in the mid-eighteenth century, under Asante direction. He adds that Akyem Kotoku did not become known by that name until after its leader, then a fugitive from Denkyira, acquired land from the people of Obuohie Kwai following the battle of Feyiase around 1699.

=== Ronald R. Atikinson ===
According to Atkinson, Old Akyem functioned as a single polity rather than as an early division between Abuakwa and Kotoku. He argues that later Abuakwa and Kotoku traditions present their histories as if they had always existed as separate and competing states, leading historians to assume that the two were already distinct polities in the early period. Atkinson maintains that this assumption is not supported by the available early evidence.

=== Ray A. Kea ===
Ray Kea treats Akyem as an early and well-established inland state. He describes it as densely settled and integrated into long-standing inland trade networks. In his analysis, Akyem operated as a city-state system in which towns served as administrative centers and was able to mobilize large military forces by forest-zone standards.

=== Robert Addo Fenning ===
Addo-Fening argues that "Akim" or "Great Acani" in seventeenth-century European sources referred to a specific inland polity located in the Pra–Birem gold belt, rather than to the later Akyem subdivisions collectively. He notes that Akyem Kotoku was established west of the Pra in the Amansie and Asante-Akyem areas, then crossed into Akyem lands only after 1700. According to him, the seventeenth-century Akyem polity corresponds primarily to what later became Akyem Abuakwa. He explains that Abuakwa and Kotoku sometimes worked together in war, but they were not a single political community. He argues that each remained a separate state with its own history and traditions, and that the name "Akyem" was only applied to all three divisions later, after Kotoku and Bosome had settled within Abuakwa territory in the nineteenth century.

== See also ==
- List of rulers of the Akan state of Akyem Abuakwa
- List of rulers of the Akan state of Akyem Kotoku
- List of rulers of the Akan state of Akyem Bosume
- Akan people
- Adanse
- Akyem Abuakwa
- Akyem Kotoku
- Akyem Bosome
- Asante Empire

== Sources ==
- Priestley, Margaret (1961). "The Ashanti Question and the British: Eighteenth-Century Origins". The Journal of African History. 2 (1): 35–59. doi:10.1017/S0021853700002139. JSTOR 179582. S2CID 153355150.
- Fynn, J. K. (1964). Ashanti and Her Neighbours c. 1700–1807 (PhD thesis). SOAS University of London.
- Fynn, John K. (1965). "The Reign and Times of Kusi Obodum, 1750–64". Transactions of the Historical Society of Ghana. 8: 24–32. JSTOR 41403567. S2CID 155465956.
- Daaku, Kwame Yeboa (1970). Trade and Politics on the Gold Coast, 1600–1720: A Study of the African Reaction to European Trade. Oxford: Clarendon Press. ISBN 019821653X.
- Boaten, Kwasi (1971). "The Asante before 1700". Research Review. 8 (1). Institute of African Studies, University of Ghana: 50–65. ISSN 0855-4412.
- Fynn, John Kofi (1973). "Asante and Akyem relations 1700–1831". Research Review. 9 (1). Institute of African Studies, University of Ghana: 58–83. ISSN 0855-4412.
- Fage, J. D.; Oliver, Roland (1975). The Cambridge History of Africa Volume 4 c. 1600–c. 1790. Cambridge University Press. ISBN 0-521-20981-1.
- Kiyaga-Mulindwa, David (1980). "The 'Akan' Problem". Current Anthropology. 21 (4): 503–506. JSTOR 2742065.
- Kea, Ray A. (1982). Settlements, Trade, and Polities in the Seventeenth Century Gold Coast. Baltimore and London: Johns Hopkins University Press. ISBN 978-0-8018-2310-7.
- Addo-Fening, Robert (1988). "The 'Akim' or 'Achim' in 17th and 18th Century Historical Contexts: Who Were They?". Institute of African Studies Research Review. 4 (2): 1–15.
- Addo-Fening, Robert (1997). Akyem Abuakwa, 1700–1943: From Ofori Panin to Sir Ofori Atta. Trondheim: Department of History, Norwegian University of Science and Technology. ISBN 9788290905205. OCLC 39313604.
- Kwarteng, Kwame Osei (2002). "The Asante Conquest of Ahafo in the 18th Century: A Historical Legacy". Transactions of the Historical Society of Ghana (6): 59–66.
- Atkinson, Ronald R. (2011) [1980]. "Old Akyem and the Origins of Akyem Abuakwa and Kotoku, 1675–1775". In Swartz, B. K.; Dumett, Raymond E. (eds.). West African Culture Dynamics: Archaeological and Historical Perspectives. Berlin: De Gruyter. ISBN 9783110800685.
