= KRA =

Kra or KRA may refer to:

== Places ==
- Kra Isthmus
- Kra Peninsula
- Kra River, Malay Peninsula
- Kerang Airport, IATA airport code "KRA", in Australia

== Other uses ==
- Kenya Revenue Authority
- Key result area, management term
- Kra (band), Japanese rock band
- Kra (letter)
- Kra languages
- Kra (mythology)
- Krita native file extension
- Kuki Revolutionary Army, an insurgent group in Manipur
- Korea Racing Authority
