= List of rulers of the Akan state of Akyem Kotoku =

Nana Frimpong-Manso IV 1998-2024

This is a list of rulers of the Akan state of Akyem Kotoku.

Tenure	Incumbent	Notes
ante 1400	Foundation of Akyem Kotoku Kingdom
Kotokuhene (rulers)
1400 to ????	Nana Yaw Aware, Kotokuhene
???? to ????	Nana Boadi Nanim, Kotokuhene
???? to ????	Nana Danso Brempong -Alias Akrofi BREMPONG, Kotokuhene
???? to 1717	Nana Ofosuhene Apenteng, Kotokuhene
ante/c.1733 to post/c. 1733	Nana Frimpong-Manso I, Kotokuhene
???? to 1814	Nana Kwakye Adeyefe, Kotokuhene
1824 to 1825	Nana Afrifa Akwada, Kotokuhene
1825 to 1867	Nana Agyeman, Kotokuhene
1867 to September 1927	Nana Attafuah, Kotokuhene
1942 to 1948	Nana Frimpong-Manso II, Kotokuhene	See bio of Dr. E.J.A. Asomaning (son), for 2 photographs of Nana Frimpong-Manso II - https://ejaasomaning.blogspot.com/
1948 to post/c. 1960	Nana Frimpong-Manso III, Kotokuhene
19?? to June 1998	Okofrobour Agyeman Attafua, Kotokuhene
June 1999 to present......pending chieftaincy dispute

== See also ==
- Akan people
- Ghana
- Gold Coast
- Lists of incumbents
