= Ashanti flag =

Flag of the Ashanti people

Ashanti Flag
- Use: National flag
- Proportion: 2:3
- Design: A horizontal tricolour of gold, black, green, fimbriated in white, with the Golden Stool stationed in the middle of flag

The Ashanti flag is the flag of the Ashanti people. It depicts the Golden Stool (Ashanti: Sika' dwa), the throne of the Asantehene.

== History ==
In the early 1950s, the Ashanti flag was green, gold and black, with a cocoa pod and a porcupine on it. In 1956, the National Liberation Movement proposed a yellow flag with a black, white and green tricolour canton as the flag of an autonomous Ashanti kingdom.

== Symbolism ==
The Ashanti flag has three horizontal stripes: gold for mineral wealth, black for the Ashanti people, and green for the forests.

The emblem in the centre is the Golden Stool, a symbol of national unity and royal authority since the 18th century. According to legend, the Stool descended from heaven in a cloud of white dust and landed in the lap of the first Ashanti Emperor Osei Tutu I. It is said to possess the sunsum (soul) of the Ashanti people.

A different version of the flag shows the gyemirekutu kyɛ, a hat made up of multiple different animal parts.
