= Ntoro =

Inherited spirits in Akan traditional beliefs

The Ntoro is the spiritual-genetic aspect of the father which the Akan people believe is passed on to his children. These 12 Ntoro are considered inherited deities (spirits) who govern guide and protect their 12 clans patrilineally. The Akan believe that the Ntoro does not die with the father. Instead, it is passed down to the man's children, or if the children are not alive, to his nephews and nieces. The father's Ntoro represents the being of the child until the child comes of age. At this point the Ntoro along with the Sunsum and Kra explains how one interacts in the world. The Ntoro is thus explained by Akans to be the father's characteristics and spiritual traits which can be inherited. Thus, it is the cooperation of the father's Ntoro with the mother's blood (Mogya) Abusua which is believed to form the child and mold it into the Human being.

== Different Ntoro ==
1) Bosompra (The Tough/Strong/firm)

The Bosompra is the "Spirit of the River Pra," a paternal lineage defined by warrior spirit, toughness, discipline, and quiet power. Those of this Ntoro are known for their brilliance, honorable, glorious, or distinguished people, resolute and assertive nature, carrying an inner strength that commands respect. Their sacred day is Wednesday, a time recognized for spiritual fortification and purification.

To maintain their spiritual heat and discipline, they observe a strict code of taboos: they strictly refrain from Ɔpɔpbere (Snail), Afasee (Water yam), Ɔwansane (Bushbuck), Akokɔ fufuo (White fowl), Okukuɔ (Red-flanked duiker), and Akyekyedeɛ (Tortoise) to ensure their spirit remains sharp and strong. When greeted, you respond with the honorary title" or "Yaa pra" reflecting a prestigious heritage shared by the names Amoah, Kwakyie, Asare, Boaten, Agyemang, Asante, Amoako, Ofori, Acheampong, Owusu, Boakye, and Okyere.The Bosompra is the "Spirit of the River Pra," a paternal lineage defined by toughness, discipline, and quiet power. Those of this Ntoro are known for their resolute and assertive nature, carrying an inner strength that commands respect. Their sacred day is Wednesday, the day they traditionally travel to the River Pra to bathe (guare) for spiritual fortification and purification.

2) Bosomtwe (The Human/Kind/empathetic)

The Bosomtwe is the "Spirit of the River Bosomtwe," a paternal lineage defined by a warrior spirit and a gentle presence. Like the Bosompra, those born of this Ntoro are warriors, carrying a powerful and protective energy. Their personality is characterized by elegance and gentility; they are naturally refined and do everything with a sense of grace and poise.Their sacred day is Sunday (Kwasiada), a time for reflection and honoring the spirit of the waters. The spiritual animal of Bosomtwe is the Antelope (Ɔtwe), representing the grace and protective nature of the lineage. To preserve their spiritual purity, they observe the Tortoise (Akyekyedae) and the Mona Monkey (Kwakuo) as their primary taboos. When a member of this lineage is greeted, they respond with the authentic honorary title "Yaa Twe," reflecting a prestigious heritage shared by the names Kisi, Agye, Ofosu, Boa, Aboa, Boafo, Atakra, Atuahene, Asenso, Yedu, Antwi, Osafuodu, Boahen, and Antiedu.

3) Bosomakɔm (The Fanatic)

The Bosomakom is the "Spirit of the River Ayensu," sharing the same river as Bosomdwerebe, Bosomakom, Bosomafi, and Bosomayensu. It is a paternal lineage defined by fearlessness, absolute truth, and a deep, intuitive understanding. Those of this Ntoro are known for their rare combination of a spiritual heart and a kind, compassionate soul. They are the over-accomplishers of the Akan people—natural high-achievers who master every task with excellence and insight. Their sacred day is Friday (Fida), a time for the fortification of their character and the honoring of their spiritual animal, the Dog, which represents their unshakeable loyalty and guardianship. When they greet you, you must respond with the authentic honorary title "Yaa Kom," reflecting a prestigious heritage of integrity and strength shared by the names Appiah, Ankoma, Bosompim, Agyaaku, Asuman, Twumasi, Anim, Asumadu, Gyekye, Addo, Asamoa, and Asiedu.

4) Bosompo/Bosomnketia (The Brave/proud/courageous)

The Bosompo (or Bosomnketia) is the spirit of the Sea, a paternal lineage defined by arrogance (dwaee), unfearness (aniamong), and a spirit of great leadership. Those born of this Ntoro are born to be great leaders, possessing a bold personality that reflects the power of the ocean, and because their spirit is tied to the vast salt waters, they traditionally purify themselves by bathing in the Sea. Their sacred day is Tuesday (Benada), and to maintain their spiritual purity, they observe the Dog (Ɔkraman) and the Sea Turtle (Akyekyedeɛ) as their primary taboos, while their soul animal is the Hippopotamus (Susono). When a member of the Bosompo Ntoro greets you, you respond with "Yaa Su," "Yaa Susono," "Yaa Po," or "Yaa Nketia," a heritage shared by those bearing names such as Bonsu, Animadu, Osei, Antwi, Dofea, Adu, Poakwa, Dakwa, Doku, Poku, Kusi, Ayim, and Appiah.

5) Bosommuru (The Respectable/distinguished)

The Bosomuru is the spirit of the River Birim, a paternal lineage defined by a warrior spirit and a glorious, honorable, dignified, beloved, and merciful presence. Like the Bosompra, those born of this Ntoro are warriors who carry a powerful and protective energy, yet their personality is equally characterized by a natural refinement. Their sacred day is Tuesday (Benada), which carries a key spiritual observance prohibiting the drinking of alcohol, and to preserve their spiritual purity, they observe the Cow (Nantwie), the Bongo (Ɔtromu), and the Tortoise (Akyekyedeɛ) as their primary taboos. When a member of the Bosomuru Ntoro greets you, you respond with "Yaa Buru," "Yaa Muru," "Yaa Oburu," or "Yaa Akudonto," a prestigious heritage shared by those bearing names such as Agyemang, Akosa, Amankwatia, Osei, Prempeh, Kwateng, Agyei, Oburi, Domfe, Asubonteng, Akenteng, Amoateng, Amaning, Ampadu, Oti, Asabre, Tum, and Otuo.

6) Bosomkonsi (The Virtuoso)

7) Bosomdwerɛbe (The Eccentric/Jittery)

8) Bosomayensu (The Truculent)

9) Bosomsika (The Fastidious)

The Bosomsika is the "Spirit of Gold," a paternal lineage defined by precision, cleanliness, and the highest standards of excellence. Those of this Ntoro are known for their meticulous nature and love for dressing well, carrying themselves with a polished dignity that mirrors their sacred day, Friday. Their spiritual guardian is the Monitor Lizard, representing a calm and observant wisdom. To keep their spirit pure, they observe strict taboos against circumcision and mixed-together foods, valuing wholeness and clarity in all things. This prestigious heritage is carried by the names Onyina, Afoakwah, Kyei, Odame, Gyabaa, Kyereme, Obeng, and Ofosu. Greetings "Yaa Sika".The Bosomsika spirit bathes in the Sika River (meaning "The Golden River").

10) Bosomkrete (The Chivalrous)

11) Bosomafram (The Liberal/Kind/empathetic)

12) Bosomafi (The Chaste)
