= Akan people =

Ethnic group in West Africa

Akanfoɔ
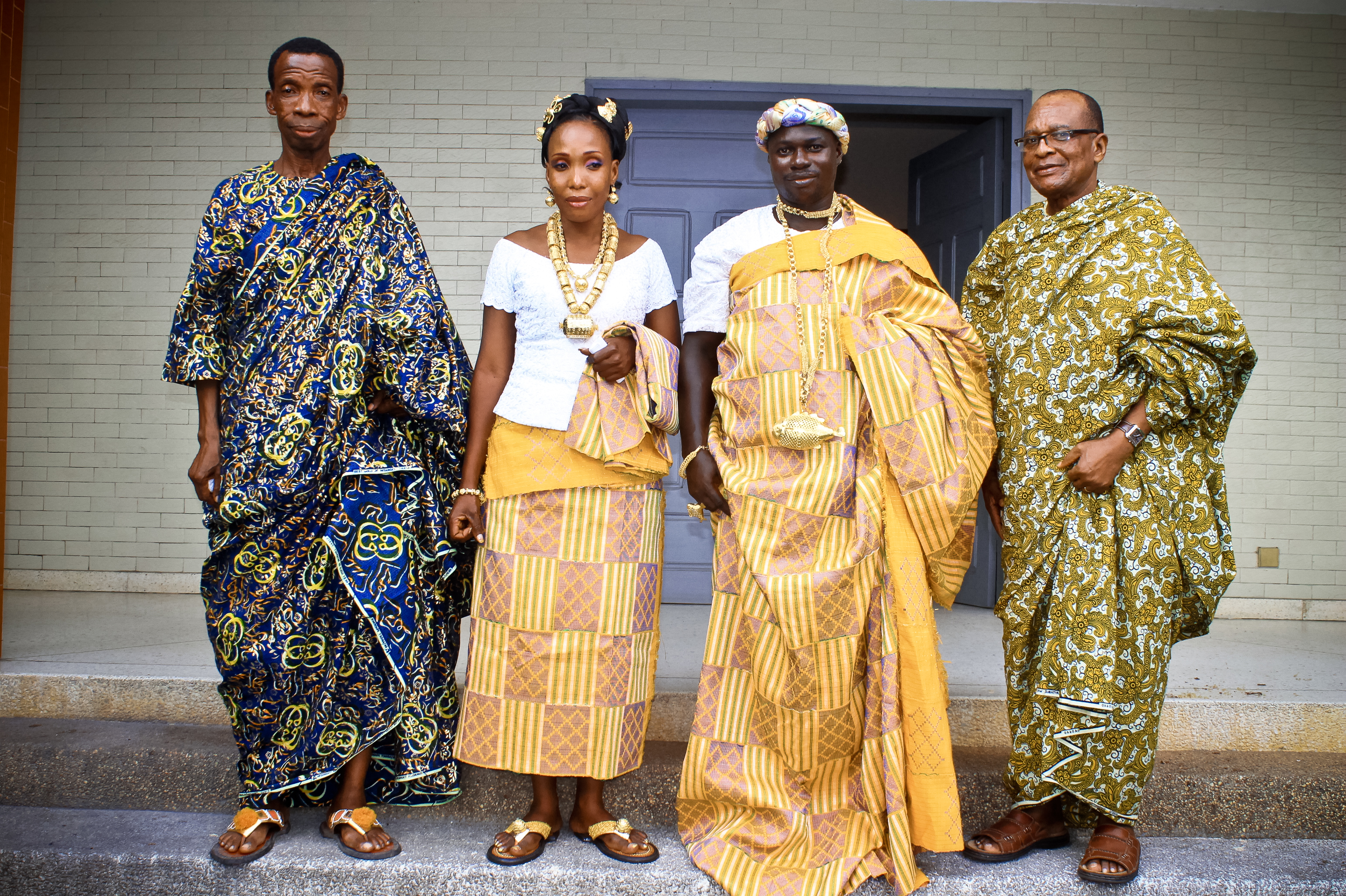

Total population
- c. 25 million (est.) (Note: CIA World Factbook population total suggests roughly 20 million.)

Regions with significant populations
- Ghana; Ivory Coast

Languages
- Akan languages • English • French

Religion
- Christianity • Islam • Akan religion

Related ethnic groups
- Guang people, Ga-Adangbe, other Kwa peoples, Afro-Caribbean people mainly Afro-Jamaicans and Afro-Surinamese

- People: Akanfoɔ
- Language: Akan
- Country: Akanman

The Akan (/ˈækæn/) people, or Akanfoɔ, are a Kwa group living primarily in Ghana and parts of Ivory Coast in West Africa. The Akan speak languages within the Tano branch of the Niger–Congo family. Subgroups of the Akan people include: the Adanse, Agona, Akuapem, Akwamu, Akyem, Anyi, Asante, Baoulé, Bono, Chakosi, Fante, Kwahu, Sefwi, Wassa, Ahanta, Denkyira and Nzema, among others. The Akan subgroups all have cultural attributes in common, most notably the tracing of royal matrilineal descent in the inheritance of property, and for succession to high political office. All Akans are considered royals in status, but not all are in royal succession or hold titles.

== Origins ==
=== Pre-colonial and colonial distortions ===
According to Jack Goody, the origins of the Akan were distorted during the colonial period by misinterpretations popularized by missionaries, administrators, and early ethnographers. One of the earliest documented attempts to explain Akan origins was made by Thomas Edward Bowdich, an English traveler who visited the Asante Empire in 1817. He argued that there were similarities between Asante political institutions and those of Ancient Egypt and Ethiopia which indicated that the Asante descended from eastern or northeastern African populations. In the early twentieth century, W. T. Balmer, a missionary historian, advanced the view that the Akan originated from the medieval Ghana Empire in the western Sudan. He argued that the decline of ancient Ghana was due to the society losing internal cohesion and was weakened by Islam invasions into the Sahel. J. B. Danquah later adopted and expanded the Ghana migration hypothesis using medieval Arabic descriptions of the ancient kingdom of Ghana and identifying it with the Akan-speaking peoples of the Gold Coast. In his 1944 book, the Akan Doctrine of God, Danquah suggested that the name “Ghana” represented an Arab corruption of “Akane” or “Akana,” and proposed a historical connection between the Akan and ancient Near Eastern civilizations. Eva L. R. Meyerowitz took the Ghana migration and diffusionist theories even further, claiming Akan ruling class and religious institutions originated from Saharan, Libyo-Berber, Egyptian, and Near Eastern sources. The theories were criticized by historians, linguists, and anthropologists, who believed they served practical purposes for missionaries, colonial administrators, and nationalist thinkers who sought moral lessons, political unity, or historical prestige.

=== Critiques of colonial era distortions ===
An earlier critic of the colonial diffusionist theories was David Tait, who argued that Eva L. R. Meyerowitz's book of Akan origins relied too heavily on speculative links between names of peoples and places across separated regions. He criticized her attempt to connect the Akan, Guan and Gonja to the Fezzan and the Djenne–Timbuktu area, claiming that many of these links lacked clear evidence. Tait denied to the use of a single Bono tradition about coming from the “great white desert” as the basis for a broad migration theory, especially since similar traditions were not found among other Akan groups. He also rejected the claim that early Bono traditions had been “lost,” arguing that there was no proof such traditions had ever existed. According to Tait, the linguistic comparisons used to support the argument crossed multiple languages and language families without enough methodological control. He believed that the book moved too quickly from collecting traditions to constructing speculative history, without first establishing the texts and their social context.

Dennis Michael Warren, an anthropologist who spent extended periods conducting fieldwork in Techiman, Ghana, reexamined Meyerowitz's interpretations of Bono history and argued that they relied on unsupported evidence. According to his findings, many informants cited by Meyerowitz denied giving her the information associated with them or contradicted her statements when interviewed independently. His work exposed that Timbuktu, Kumbu, Diala, and Diadom were not commonly known in Bono oral tradition and were only recognized by people familiar with Meyerowitz's ideas, suggesting that the narratives were introduced from herself and not passed down locally. Warren concluded that an accurate reconstruction of Bono Manso history before the Asante conquest of 1722–1723 was not possible using available oral evidence. Warren warned that Meyerowitz's work had already entered school textbooks and popular histories as established fact and influence local narratives which made it difficult to distinguish authentic oral traditions from foreign fabrications.

=== Archaeology and methodological criticism ===
As more fieldwork was conducted in Akan regions, earlier statements associating Akan origins with migrations from different regions were questioned and reassessed. Archaeologist Merrick Posnansky criticized the use of oral traditions recorded by non-specialists, arguing that the material, when interpreted through assumptions, created conflicting accounts of origins and lacked archaeological or historical validation. He mentioned how scholars like J. B. Danquah and Eva Meyerowitz sought historical validated by projecting Near Eastern or Mesopotamian origins onto Akan societies. In 1995, following archaeological research, Peter and Ama Shinnie concluded that there is no evidence to support older theories proposing migrations of the Asante and other Akan peoples from North Africa, the Sahara, or the eastern Mediterranean. They argued the theories reflect outdated assumptions that complex societies in West Africa must have originated elsewhere rather than developing locally. Shinnie's main argument was that if the Akan had really come from the north, their language would be closely related to the languages spoken north of the forest zone, but Akan instead belongs to the Kwa language family, which, apart from Gonja, is not closely related to the languages of northern Ghana.

== Oral Traditions ==
Oral traditions and archaeological evidence indicate that the Akan trace their origins to the forest and forest–savanna transition zone, with early settlements such of Bono Manso, Begho, Wenchi, Asantemanso and Adansemanso playing central roles in their historical development. The Bono people of Takyiman recount Bonoman one of the first Akan states, with its capital Bono Manso founded by a leader named Asaman, who emerged with his people from a sacred cave known as Amowi near modern day Techiman. According to tradition, God created the Bono before the sky itself, and their land was the birthplace of humankind. The word “Bono” is said to mean “original” or “first.” Oral traditions from the Bono people of Old Wenchi recount that their ancestors first emerged from the ground at Bonoso, led out by a pig-like quadruped called Wankyi, before establishing their settlement at Old Wenchi (Ahwene Koko). The Bono people of the Nyarko, trace their ancestry to the ancestress Efua Nyarko, after whom a quarter of Begho was named.

According to Adanse traditions and cosmogony, Adanse was the traditional “Garden of Eden” of all the Akan and is regarded as one of the first of the Akan states, standing at the head of the entire Akan nation. They recount that their land is considered a sacred place of creation and early political formation, regarded as the ancestral homeland from which all the southern Akan trace their origins. It is described as the first among five foundational states, Adanse, Akyem, Assin, Denkyira, and Asante, collectively called Akanman Piesie Anum. Clans such as the Asona, Agona, Oyoko, and Bretuo are believed to have either originated from, settled, or have passed through Adanse. The Asante people trace their roots to Asantemanso, where the matriarch Ankyewa Nyame is said to have descended with sacred regalia, and where the founding clans emerged from the earth. Akyem Kotoku, Akyem Bosome, Assin Atandansu, Assin Apimenin as well as the Asante of Mampong, Dwaben, Kokofu, among others, claim to have migrated at various times from the Adanse area of the Asante Region. These traditions emphasize sacred geography, clan emergence, and spiritual unity, with the deity Bona acting as guardian of Adanse's early cohesion. The Akwamu identify early capitals at Twifo-Hemang, Asamangkese and later Nyanaoase, located near key trade routes in the southern forests. As their power grew, the capital shifted multiple times, eventually crossing the Volta Gorge.

In the south and west, the Fante people recount a migration from Bono-Tekyiman to the coast, where they encountered the Etsi. Their founding is tied to Mankessim and the rock shrine Nananom Pow, linked to the legendary ancestral trio Obrumankoma, Odapagyan, and Oson. The Aowin (also known as Agni) claim an early presence in the western forests. Their kingdom dominated regional trade and provided refuge to displaced groups before its decline during wars with Denkyira and Asante. The Sefwi people trace their origins to the Bono and Adansi areas but describe distinct migrations into the western forests in response to 17th–18th century warfare.

The Nzima trace their origins to the formation of the Nzima Kingdom, created by three brothers, Annor Blay Ackah, Bua Kanyili, and Ahmiree II, who united the existing states of Jomoro, Abripiquem, and Ankobra through wealth gained from European trade. Known in European records as Apolonia, this new polity dominated the south-western coast of the Gold Coast throughout the eighteenth century. Further west, the Baoulé people of Côte d'Ivoire trace their ancestry to Akan groups who migrated westward from the Gold Coast in two waves during the early eighteenth century. The first, known as the Alanguié Baoulé, moved from Denkyira after its defeat by the Asante around 1701, while the second, the Assabou group, left Kumasi following a disputed succession after the death of Osei Tutu in 1717.

== History ==
=== Ancient origins ===
E1b1a1-M2 is the predominant paternal haplogroup in West Africa (70-97%). According to Shriner and Rotimi, genetic analysis suggests that the sickle-cell mutation originated about 7,300 years ago during the Holocene Wet Phase. Their study found evidence for a single origin of the mutation in Africa, possibly in the Sahara or in west-central Africa, before it later spread across different populations on the continent. During the Holocene the Sahara experienced major climatic changes. Around 11,000 years ago, during the African Humid Period, lakes, rivers, and grasslands spread across areas that are now desert. Archaeological evidence shows that human populations lived across the Sahara during this time. Between about 6300 and 5200 years ago the climate became dry again, population levels declined, and many desert regions were abandoned.

=== Kintampo Complex ===
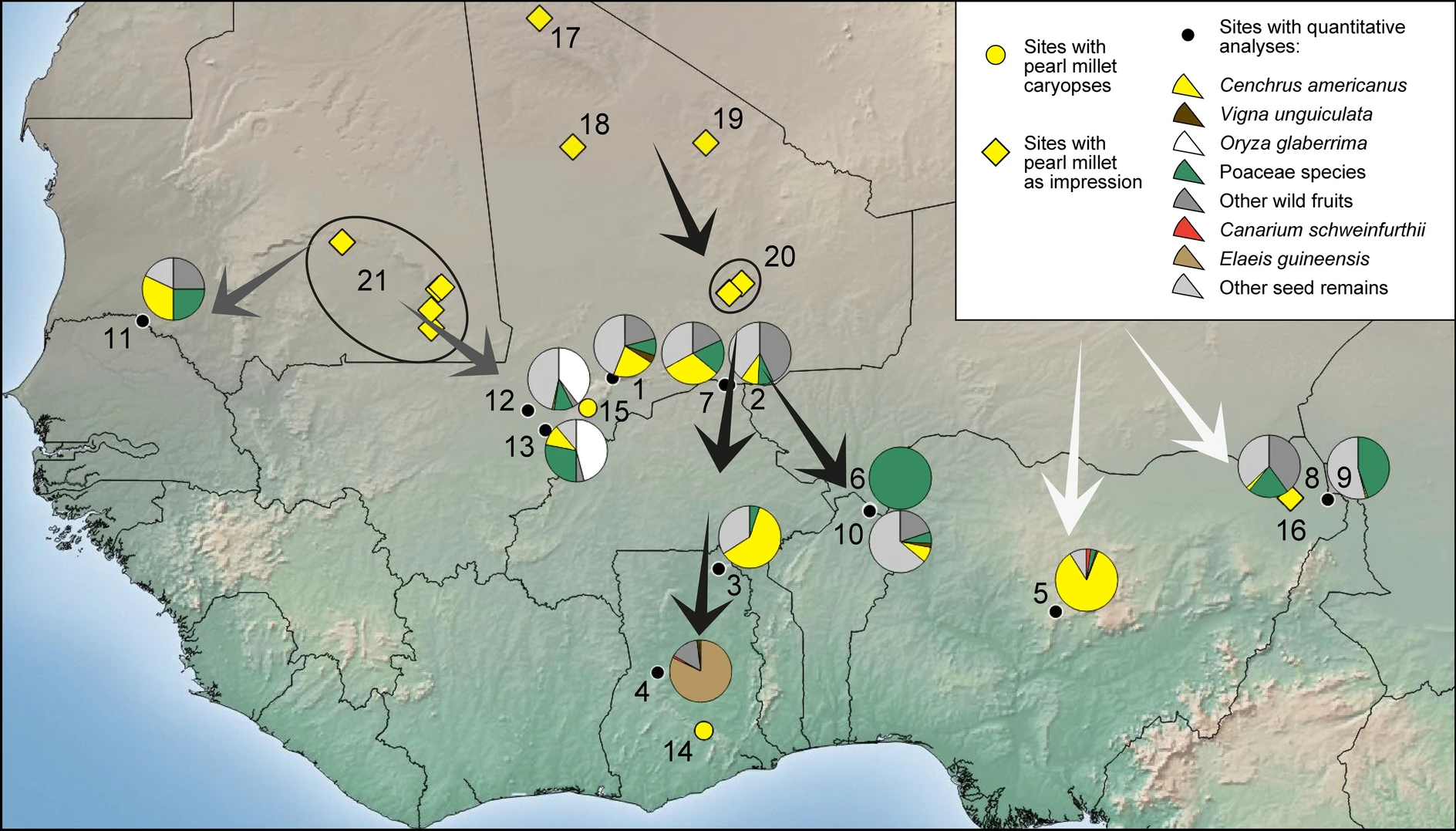
West African sites with archaeobotanical remains (3rd–1st millennium BCE), including diffusion routes of pearl millet into the savanna zones north of the Akan forest region.

The earliest cultural developments in the Akan forest zone are associated with the Kintampo Complex (c. 2000–500 BCE), which marked the transition from foraging to sedentary village life. Archaeological evidence from central Ghana reveals that early communities practiced mixed farming, kept domestic animals, and produced decorated ceramics, polished stone tools, and terracotta figurines.

=== Ancestral sites ===
By the 5th century CE, northern forest communities had developed long-term settlements supported by agriculture, trade, and iron production. Oral traditions from the Bono recall emergence from sacred caves like Amowi and the founding of Bono Manso. Research at sites such as Kranka Dada revealed continuous occupation and participation in wider regional trade. By the 14th century, the Bono region was linked to the Niger trade routes. Excavations at Bonoso, the first settlement of the Wankyi Bono, uncovered iron-smelting furnaces, slag, copper ornaments, and pottery, with radiocarbon dates between 660 and 1068 CE. The Nyarko quarter of Begho, named after the ancestress Efua Nyarko, was a proto-urban settlement dated to 965–1125 CE. The site contained iron tools, copper objects, ivory, and painted pottery comparable to 9th-century finds from New Buipe.

In the southern forests, Asantemanso was continuously occupied from at least the 9th century CE, with traces of earlier habitation possibly dating as far back as 700 BCE. It is remembered in local traditions as the ancestral origin of the Oyoko and Aduana clans. Further south, Adansemanso was settled as early as 393 CE, and was mainly occupied in the first half of the second the millennium.The excavations revealed that the southern forest sites developed earlier than previously believed and were contemporary with northern forest centers like Begho and Bono Manso.

=== Bono and the northern Akan cradle ===
Bono Manso consolidated into a polity between the 11th and 13th centuries. At its height, Bono Manso was recognized as the seat of the "Dua-duakwa hene mu hene" (king of many kings). By the 13th century, Begho had grown into a major commercial town. Archaeological research shows it was predominantly Brong in culture, with distinct quarters for Mande-speaking Muslim merchants and craft specialists, including brassworkers at Dwinfuor and iron smelters at Dapaa, in the northwest. Spindle whorls, dye pits, terracotta weights, and glass beads were among many items were present in the site. Its position allowed it to link forest and savanna products to centers such as Jenne, Kong, and Bobo-Dioulasso.

In the 14th century, Begho had become a cosmopolitan hub with copper and brass workshops, dyewells, imported Chinese porcelain, and Islamic gold weights. Estimates place its population between 7,000 and 10,000, and was one of the largest settlements in precolonial Ghana. Gold formed the backbone of Bono's economy, fueling both internal authority and external commerce. Connections with trans-Saharan caravans grew as Dyula merchants exchanged brassware, cowries, textiles, and horses for gold, kola, and ivory. Bono Manso, Wankyi, and Begho were integrated into this network. The Akan goldfields, and its associated settlements, came to be recognized as one of the three gold-producing regions, alongside Bambuk and Bure. Archaeological parallels from Wenchi indicate that some of its early settlements were contemporaneous with Begho and Bono Manso, possibly dating to the 14th century, suggesting a wider regional development of northern Akan culture.

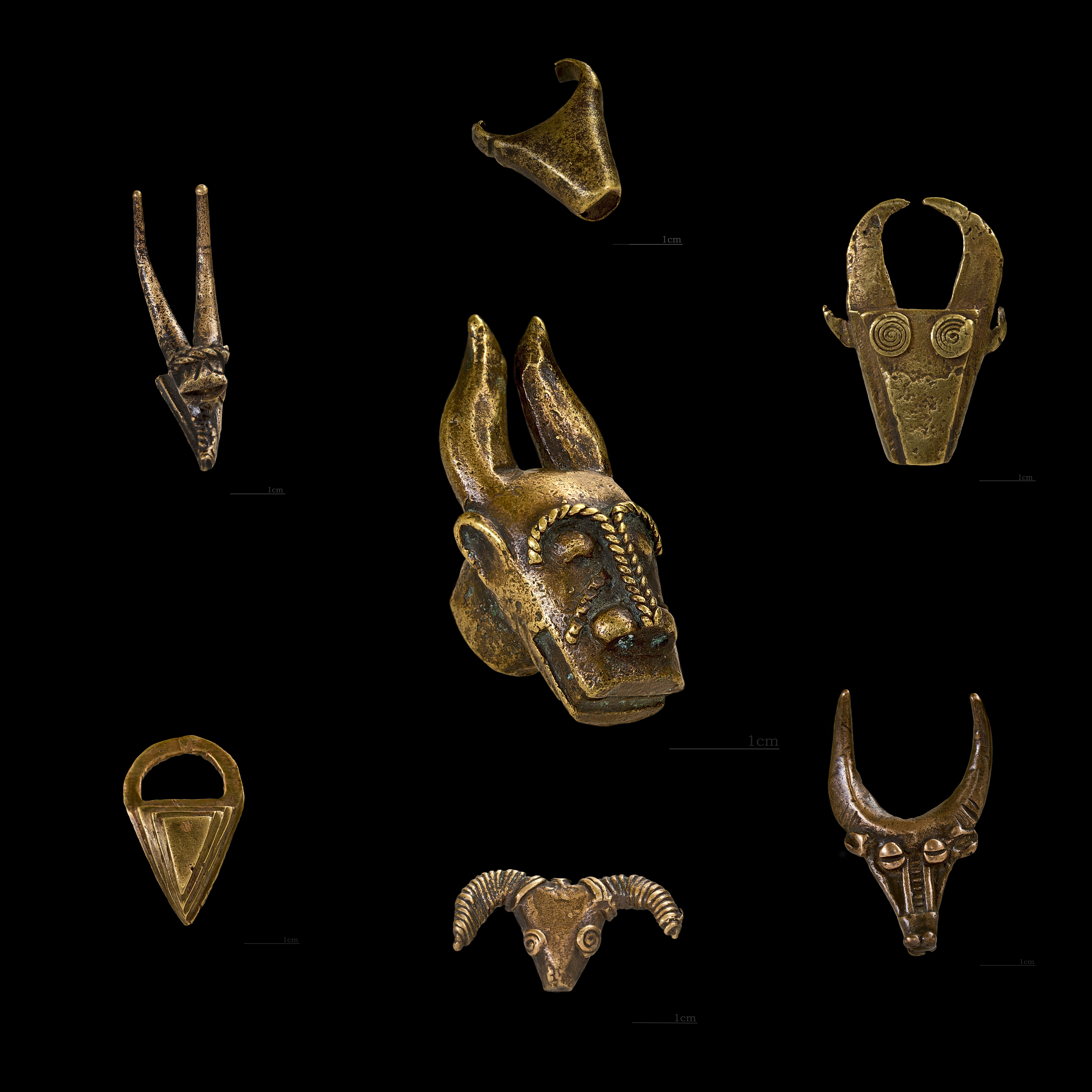
Cast brass weights used to measure precise amounts of gold dust. These weights, developed as early as the seventeenth century, represent Akan craftsmanship and gold-based economies.

=== Adanse and the southern Akan cradle ===
The Adanse state emerged in the forest zone and is remembered in Akan cosmogony as the place “where God began creation”. Local traditions identify Adansemanso as its first capital. It was regarded as the first among five foundational Akan polities, along with Akyem Kingdoms, Kingdom of Assin, Kingdom of Denkyira, and Asante, which are collectively known as the Akanman Piesie Anum. Major clans such as the Ekouna, Asona, Bretuo, Oyoko, Asakyiri, Asenie, and Agona trace their origins to towns within its territory.

By the 13th century, Adanse was integrated into Trans-Saharan trade networks through Wangara intermediaries, exchanging gold for Saharan goods. Gold was mined in areas such as Akrokerri and Dompoase under ritual supervision invoking the deity Bona. Statecraft was tied to control over goldfields, tribute, and military organization, with towns like Edubiase and Bodwesanwo producing iron weapons. At its peak in the 13th–15th centuries, Adansemanso was one of the largest ancient towns in the central forest zone, containing domestic structures, iron-smelting debris, and brass gold weights.

In the 15th century, elite families with origins in Adansemanso and Asantemanso became wealthy through long-distance trade and established a political system known as abirempondom. These obirempon ruled from dominant towns that exercised authority over surrounding towns of free and unfree subjects, creating new forms of jurisdiction, land clearance, and court culture.

=== Southern and Coastal Frontiers ===
As centralized states like Bonoman and Adanse developed, groups of Akan-speaking peoples began dispersing southward into the forest and coastal belts of southern Ghana. This movement was driven by the search for fertile land, access to gold resources, and emerging political dynamics in the interior. A southward migration led to the formation of the Fante, whose oral traditions trace their origins to inland centers such as Bono-Takyiman and Adanse. After settling near Mankessim, the Fante established a settlement, and the Nananom Pow, a sacred grove. Before Portuguese contact in 1471, Akan communities were established along the coast. These groups maintained cultural and political ties to the interior.

As these migrations increased, new settlements were founded in the forest zone, giving rise to gold-producing states such as Wassa, Aowin (Anyi or Agni), and others. According to oral traditions, the Aowin state of the Aowin (Agni) people grew to become the dominant power in the southwestern forest, controlling gold sources and trade routes to Apollonia and Begho. Their territory later became a refuge for groups displaced by wars and territorial conflicts.

=== The Kingdoms of Arcania, Acanny, and the Accanists ===
In the late 16th century, Portuguese explorers encountered Akan-speaking merchants controlling gold routes from the forest interior to the coast. Duarte Pacheco Pereira (1505–1508) listed inland traders as the Haccanys, Boroes, Bremus, Cacres, Andese, and Souzos, who brought gold from distant lands to the coast.

Some of the names are now understood as early references to Akan groups in the Pra–Ofin–Birim basin. Portuguese writings described them as cavaleiros mercadores (“merchant knights”). A 1629 Dutch map marked three inland zones as “Akani,” which produced the finest gold, referred to as “Akan sika.” Portuguese forts like São Jorge da Mina were built to secure this trade, but the Akan states controlled gold production and supply. By the early 16th century, the inland Akan polities were facing growing internal and external pressures. Portuguese records from 1502 mention a war between the Akan and Atis (Etsii), and in 1548 they noted a “civil war among the Akans”. The European demand for gold and the introduction of firearms intensified the rivalries. Akan polities began buying muskets through coastal trade and enslaved captives.

=== Fragmentation and Rise of Regional Powers ===
In the 17th century onward, the Dutch, British, Danes, and Brandenburgers, intensified their presence along the coast, competing for access to the inland Akan goldfields. In return, they supplied firearms, gunpowder, and textiles. Muskets quickly became important to state-building, and armed expansionism grew central to political survival across the region.

Overtime states such as Akwamu, Denkyira, Akyem, and Assin grew as militarized powers. These polities began expanding territory, controlling trade routes, and asserting political control. European writings from this period began distinguishing Great Accany with Akyem in the east, and Little Accany with the Kingdom of Assin in the south of the goldfields. As warfare escalated and tribute networks collapsed, the cohesion of the Akan heartland fractured. The late 17th century saw the rise of Denkyira and Akwamu as the most dominant states. As Akwamu rose as a major Akan power, it began expanding eastward under Ansa Sasraku and capturing Accra by 1681, turning it into a tributary while collecting rents from European forts. Denkyira, built on gold wealth and military conquest, imposed harsh demands on its tributaries under Boaponsem and laterNtim Gyakari, provoking widespread unrest. Its imperial control sparked the rise of Osei Tutu and the Asante Empire.

=== The Rise of the Asante Empire ===
In the late 17th century, Osei Tutu, who returned from exile at Akwamu with political experience. With Anokye, unified clans and created the Golden Stool, the symbol of Asante nationhood. In 1699, Asante challenged Denkyira, whose tributaries, joined the revolt. Denkyira's firearm supply was cut off, and in 1701 it was defeated at the Battle of Feyiase. Asante then centralized power and expanded rapidly. By 1709, it was a dominant force inland. As Asante power extended southwestward, it came into direct conflict with the Aowin (Agni) state, which had previously dominated the region between the Tano and Bia. In 1715, Asante forces under General Amankwatia, aided by their Wiawso allies. they launched a major campaign against Aowin. As Aowin declined, incoming migrants from Bono, Adanse, and Denkyira established three autonomous but related states: Sefwi Wiawso, Sefwi Bekwai, and Sefwi Anhwiaso, which absorbed cultural influences from neighboring Akan polities.

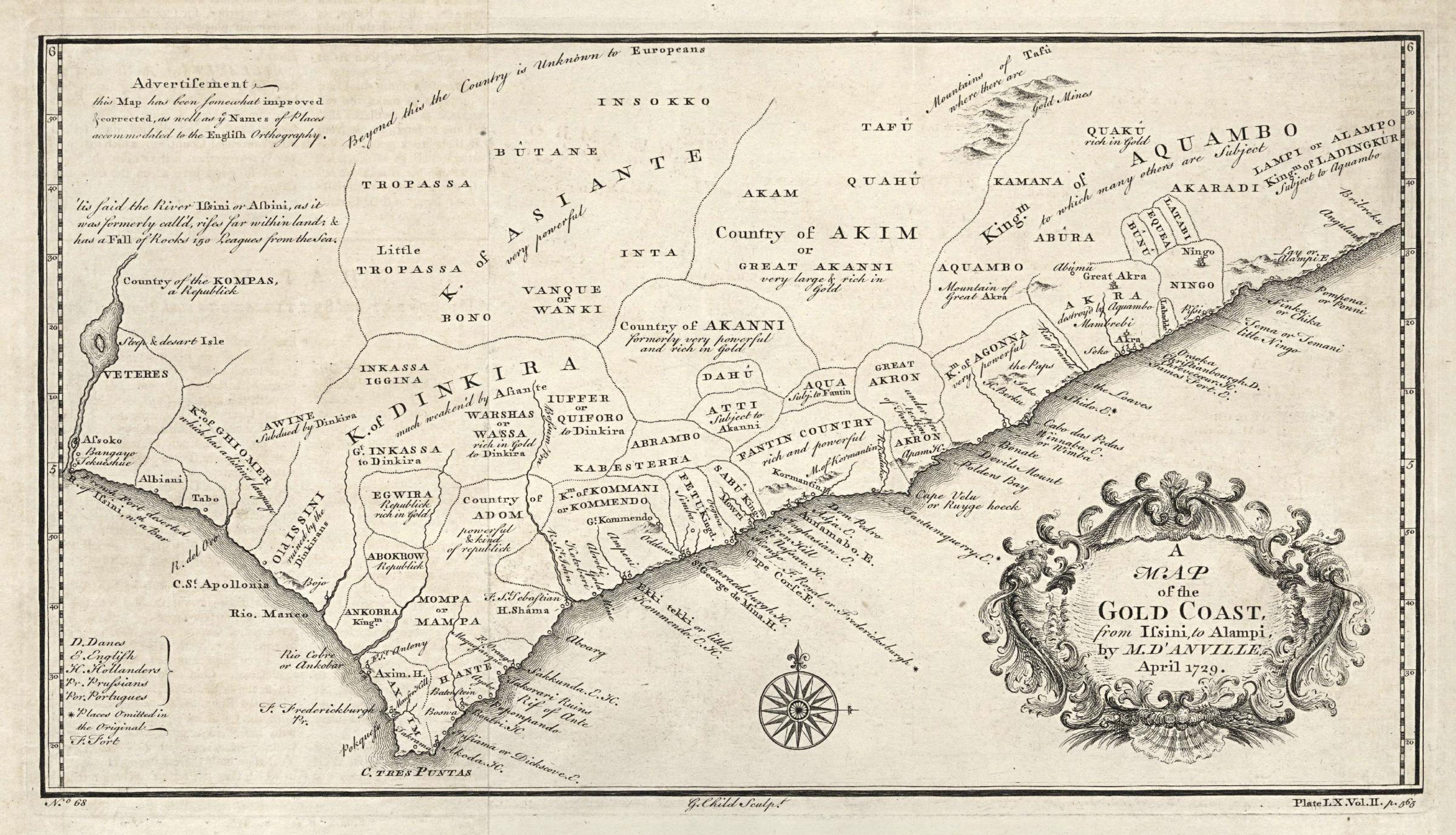
Map of the Gold Coast c.1729.

In 1722–1723 internal succession disputes and the unpopular rule of Ameyaw Kwakye had already weakened Bono's authority, and Asante forces quickly overran the town, capturing its rulers and artisans, and relocating regalia and treasury assets to Kumase. Many Bono fled to Techiman, while others migrated westward regrouping in nearby locations like Gyaman, Abease, and the Banda area. Wars during this period caused the Baoulé and other splinter groups seeking refuge from Asante expansion.

=== Akan Peoples in the Trans-Atlantic Slave Trade ===
Many people across the Americas trace their ancestry to Akan-speaking populations due to the trans-Atlantic slave trade. Between the 17th and 19th centuries, a significant proportion of enslaved Africans shipped from the Gold Coast, estimated at 10% of all embarkations from West Africa were of Akan origin. Internal conflicts among the Akan states during the 17th to 18th centuries, led to the capture and selling of war captives.

Akan captives, labeled as “Coromantee” in British colonies, gained a reputation for resistance and military discipline. Many were former soldiers from warring states like Fante, Akwamu or Ashanti, and their skills were transferred to plantation and maroon communities. They played central roles in uprisings across the Americas, including the 1733 Akwamu-led revolt on St. John, the 1760 Tacky's Rebellion in Jamaica, and the 1763 Berbice uprising in Guyana led by Coffy, a Coromantee war captain. Some Coromantee, such as Chief Takyi in Jamaica, were former warlords turned rebels who attempted to recreate Akan-style governance during these revolts. In several colonies, colonial authorities even feared large concentrations of Coromantee slaves, associating them with rebellion and political organization.

=== The Asante Empire and the Fante Confederacy ===
The Asante Empire emerged as the dominant military and commercial power in the forest zone by the early 18th century. It controlled trade routes extending from the savanna hinterlands in the north to the Atlantic coast, extracting tribute and asserting influence over formerly independent states. Asante's control over goldfields and strategic corridors put it in direct competition with coastal states like the Fante Confederacy. In response to rising Asante power and European trade pressures, the Fante reorganized in the mid-18th century into a defensive coalition of city-states led from Mankessim. The Fante developed a distinct political identity influenced by diplomacy with European powers and rivalry with Asante. The Fante Confederacy had become a key player along the coast, defending its territory through alliances with the British and resisting inland incursions.

=== Anglo–Asante Wars, Colonization and the Partition of the Akan World ===
After clashes between the Asante and the British occurred, treaties by Thomas Bowdich (1817) and William Dupuis (1820) failed to end long-term hostilities. The Anglo-Ashanti wars erupted in cycles, with the 1824 battle at Nsamankow, the 1826 defeat at Katamanso, and the 1874 British invasion of Kumasi, which led to the looting of the palace and destruction of regalia. The Asante remained autonomous until 1900, when a final confrontation over British demands for the Golden Stool triggered the War of the Golden Stool. Led by Yaa Asantewaa, Queen Mother of Ejisu, Asante resistance culminated in the siege of Kumasi, the exile of Asantehene Prempeh I, and Asante's formal incorporation into the British colony by 1901.

Meanwhile, Gyaman engaged with French expansion in the western Sudan. In 1888, the Gyamanhene signed a protection treaty with France to resist Asante and British encroachment. France failed to assert control, and in 1895, Samori Touré launched a campaign that destabilized the region. After the French expelled Samori in 1897, Gyaman was partitioned: the western zone, including Bonduku, was annexed into French West Africa, while the eastern section, centered on Sampa, became part of the British Protectorate.

On the coast, states such as the Fante Confederacy and others were gradually brought under indirect British rule through treaties. By the early 20th century, nearly all Akan territories had been absorbed into the colonial territories of the British Gold Coast and the French Colonial Empire. In central Côte d'Ivoire, the Baoulé also resisted colonial occupation. In 1906, Governor Gabriel Angoulvant launched a military campaign to forcibly subdue Baoulé chiefdoms, marking one of the last major uprisings against French rule in the region.

=== Independence ===
On 6 March 1957, under the leadership of Kwame Nkrumah and the Convention People's Party, the Gold Coast became the first sub-Saharan African colony to achieve independence from European colonial rule. The new nation was renamed Ghana, symbolically connecting modern statehood to the region's historic legacy of powerful African empires. The territory united the Gold Coast colony with British Togoland, as well as the Northern and Upper regions.

Across the border, neighboring Ivory Coast gained independence from France in 1960 under the leadership of Félix Houphouët-Boigny, a prominent Baoulé figure who had served as a French parliamentarian. As president, Houphouët-Boigny oversaw the establishment of a centralized state that integrated traditional Akan political culture with republican governance. Like Ghana, Ivory Coast is home to a significant Akan population with 40% of the national total. In 1969, the Sanwi kingdom of Krinjabo, famously attempted to secede from Ivory Coast and restore monarchical rule.

== Akan politics ==
The Akans consider themselves one nation. Akan means first, foremost, indicating the enlightened and civilized. While traditionally matrilineal, they are also united philosophically through 12 patrilineal spirit groups called the Ntoro. Within the Akan nation are branches based on many dialects, widest and possibly the oldest one being used is Twi as well as Fante. Each branch subsequently holds a collection of states and stemming from city-states. The state or Ɔman are typically ruled by several kings known as Amanhene (Ɔmanhene, singular) or Ahemfo (Ɔhene, singular). The state is the basic unit of Akan polity. Several states and city-states can band together to form a confederacy or an empire regardless of clan or abusua they belong to, while those outsides of the Akan people or the abusua were usually conquered or annexed via war or mutual agreement. For example, the Guan state of Larteh and the Akyem state of Akropong joined to form the Akwapim Kingdom to avoid the Akwamu, who the Guan deemed as oppressive. Under the State there are Divisions and under these Divisions are towns and villages. The Fantes also upon migrating from the interior Takyiman conquered other Guan tribes including Efutu and Ewutu and merged them into Mfantseman.

Akan kings are ranked according to their jurisdiction. The head of an inter-clan Confederacy is usually considered a King, as in the Kings of Ashanti, Fante, Akyem and the Akwapim. Under these are the heads of the constituent states who equates an Emperor that only heads an Empire (e.g., Asante Empire and the Denkyira). In Asante's case, as an Empire, the Asantehene reigned over the non-Oyoko clan city-states and ruled over the kings of those states as an Imperial head or Emperor (a hardly used but an equivalent term for Emperor or the king of kings). Next there are divisional Chiefs, they are primarily arranged according to the five divisions of an Akan army. The Fante army or Asafo formation resembles a cross or an airplane. The Fante battle formations eventually had some European influences and many Asafo Frankaa (battle flags) incorporated the British Union Jack after 1844 when they allied with them. The battle formation has the Frontline, the West Flank, an East Flank, the main body and the Vanguard. There are, therefore, five divisional chiefs in each Paramountcy. These are followed in rank by the Kings of the city and then the Kings of the town and then king of the suburbs.

The Akan peoples mostly have seven Abusua (Matrilineal clans/tribes) in each state. They do not have the same names in each state but each has an equivalent clan (e.g. in Fante areas along the coast, the Asante clan of Oyoko is referred to as Dehyena or Yokofo). The clans are assigned States which they rule by their status as founders of that jurisdiction. The Ashanti Kingdom is ruled by the Oyoko Clan. However, the Bretuo or Twidanfo (in Fante), as well as other clans, rule States, Divisions, Towns, and Villages within the Kingdom. The Fante-speaking peoples usually have the Asona Clan ruling most of their States (like Mankessim). Certain sub-clans or lineages have exclusive rights to some stools within Akanland such as the lineage of Afia Kobi in the Oyoko Clan who alone sits on the Golden Stool of Asante.

The Akans are traditionally a Matrilineal people of the African continent. Matrilineal inheritance makes it easier to trace the line of succession. Within each lineage or House are the branches. The chief of a family is called an Abusuapanyin (or family-elder). Ranking above a family chief (a family's Abusuapanyin) is the clan's chief (or clan's Abusuapanyin). These branches are called Jaase/Gyaase or Kitchens. Each Kitchen takes its turn to present a candidate for the stool to the kingmakers of the lineage. Once accepted their candidate rules till death. This means until all the Jaase have presented their candidates they have to wait their turn.

Akan Kings of whatever rank have other nobleman who serve them as sub-chiefs. These sub-chiefs do not have hereditary titles and therefore do not have black stools. Besides, each King has a female co-ruler known as the Queen-mother. The Queen-mother is more like a figurehead representing the King's or Emperor's eldest sister and hence the mother of the next King or Emperor, she could rule as a King if she wishes (e.g. queen-mothers mainly from the House of Asona clan: Nana Abena Boaa who ruled Offinso 1610–1640, Nana Afia Dokuaa who ruled Akyem Abuakwa 1817–1835, and Nana Yaa Asantewaa who ruled Edweso 1896–1900) as well as Komfo Muna who ruled Mankessim 1830–1872. They present the candidate for consideration as King. An assistant king does not have a Queen-mother as his title is not hereditary.

A Prince or Daakyehen (Fante, literally Future-king) is any of the members of the lineage eligible to sit on a stool. However, not all royals are Princes as some may be ineligible. A prince is not necessarily the son of a King but rather the former King's nephew on the mother's side. As such, royals strive to achieve the position of a prince in their families or for their children. All Akan clans are considered royal in the context of their matrilineal society. Each clan, known as abusua, plays a significant role in inheritance, succession, and the selection of chiefs. The eight main Akan clans—Oyoko, Bretuo, Agona, Asona, Asenie, Aduana, Ekuona, and Asakyiri—are integral to the governance of their respective communities. Members of these clans are viewed as royals, as chiefs are traditionally chosen from them, reinforcing their royal status within Akan culture.

A sub-chief does not, however, need to be a nobleman. He only has to be suitable for the position he is to occupy. Some sub-chieftaincy positions can be abolished at will. They include the heads of the ruling house or Mankrado, the Linquist, the Chief Kingmaker or Jaasehen/Gyaasehen, the Supi (Fante) or General of the Army, the Captains of the Army or Asafohen (Fante) among others. The way Akans ruled their nation fascinated the tribes and peoples of other West African nations and as the Akans conquered or formed alliances with these nations, parts of it were transmitted to them. The British particularly felt the Akan system was highly efficient and tried to establish it throughout their dominions in West Africa using the Indirect Rule System. The Ewes and the Ga-Adangmes with their close affinity to the Akans have modified certain aspects of it to fit their societies.

In Ghana and other modern states where the Akan people are located, the Kings, Assistant Kings, Princes, and Noblemen of the Akans serve mostly a symbolic role. Modern politics has side-lined them in national politics although it is common to find that an elected or appointed official to be of Akan royalty. And, especially in the villages and poor areas, traditional Kings are still very important for organizing development, social services and keeping the peace. Some Kings have decided to push ahead with the leadership of their Kingdoms and States in a non-political fashion. The Asantehen and okyehen have emphasized Education and Environmental Sustainability respectively. Others push the national government and its agents to fulfill promises to their people.

In modern Ghana, a quasi-legislative/judicial body known as the House of "Chiefs" (a colonial term to belittle African Kings because of the racist belief to not equate an African King with a European King in rank) has been established to oversee "chieftaincy" and the Government of Ghana as the British Government once did certifies the Chiefs and gazettes them. Several Akan Kings sit at the various levels of the National House of "Chiefs". Each Paramountcy has a Traditional Council, then there is the Regional House of "Chiefs" and lastly the National House of "Chiefs". Akan Kings who once warred with each other and Kings of other nations within Ghana now sit with them to build peace and advocate development for their nations. The identity of an Akan nation or meta-ethnicity is expressed by the term Akanman. The Akan word ɔman (plural Aman) which forms the second element in this expression has a meaning much of "community, town, nation, state". (A)man has been translated as "Akanland".

== Akan language ==
Akan refers to the language of the Akan ethnolinguistic group and the Akan language which was and is the most widely spoken and used indigenous language in the Akan peoples in Ghana. Each ethnic group having its own dialect Akan is officially recognized for literacy in the Akan-majority regions, at the primary and elementary educational stage (Primary 1–3) K–12 (education) level, and studied at university as a bachelor's degree or master's degree program. The Akan language is spoken as the predominant language in the Western, Central, Ashanti, Eastern, Brong Ahafo regions of the akan clan. A language with some Akan influence called Ndyuka is also spoken in South America (Suriname and French Guiana), with the Akan language coming to these South American and Caribbean places through the trans-Atlantic slave trade and Akan names and folktales are still used in these South American and Caribbean countries (another example can be seen in the Maroons of Jamaica and their influence with Akan culture and loanwords specifically from the Fante dialect of the Central Region of Ghana) in the language of Jamaican Maroon Creole or Kromanti. With the present state of technology, one can listen to live radio broadcasts in Akan from numerous radio stations and receive mass media and public broadcasts in Akan from numerous multimedia and media broadcasting. Akan is studied in major universities in North America and the United States, including Ohio University, Ohio State University, University of Wisconsin–Madison, Harvard University, Boston University, Indiana University, University of Michigan, and the University of Florida. The Akan language has been a regular language of study in the annual Summer Cooperative African Languages Institute (SCALI) program and the Akan language is regulated and administered by the Akan Orthography Committee (AOC). Some of Akan's language characteristic features include tone, vowel harmony, and nasalization.

== Culture ==
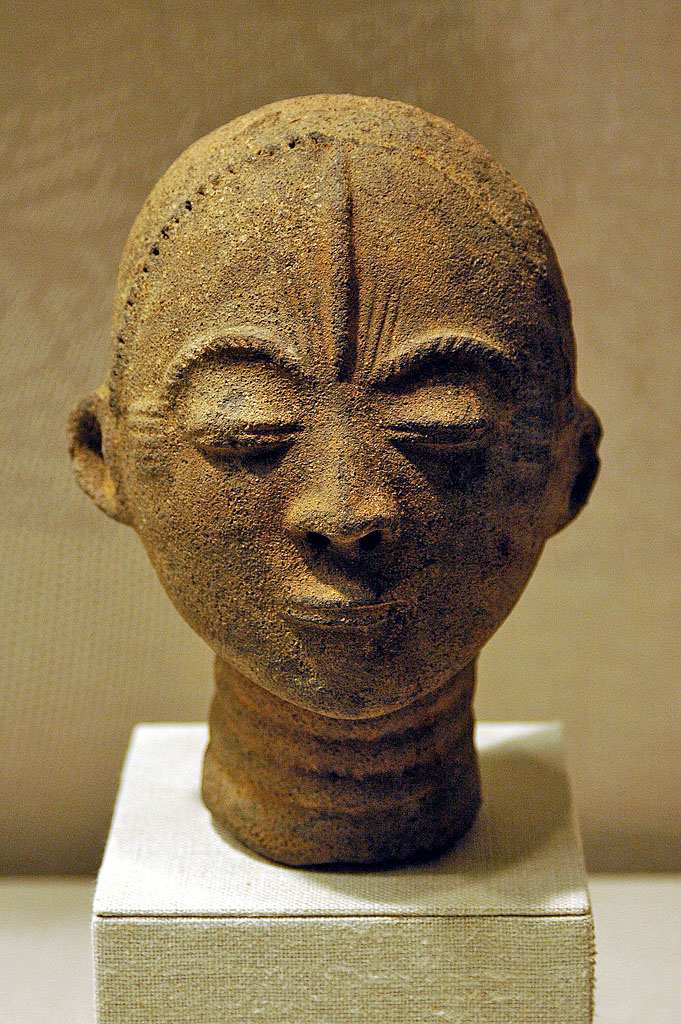
17th Century Akan Terracotta (Metropolitan Museum of Art)

Akan culture is one of the traditional matrilineal cultures of Africa. Akan art is wide-ranging and renowned, especially for the tradition of crafting bronze gold weights, using the lost-wax casting method. The Akan culture reached South America, the Caribbean, and North America.

Some of their most important mythological stories are called anansesem, literally meaning "the spider story", but in a figurative sense also meaning "traveler's tales". These "spider stories" are sometimes also referred to as nyankomsem: "words of a sky god". The stories generally, but not always, revolve around Kwaku Ananse, a trickster spirit, often depicted as a spider, human, or a combination thereof.

Elements of Akan culture also include, but are not limited to:

- Akan art
- Kente cloth
- Adinkra symbols
- Outdooring naming ceremony
- Akan names
- Akan calendar
- Akan chieftaincy
- Akan gold weights
- Akan religion
- Momome

== Beliefs ==
=== Concepts of Akan philosophy and inheritance ===
These are the basic concepts of Akan philosophy and inheritance:

- Abusua (mogya) – What an Akan inherits from his mother
- Ntoro – What an Akan gets from his father, but one does not belong to a Ntoro; instead one belongs to one's Abusua
- Sunsum – What an Akan develops from interaction with the world
- Kra – What an Akan gets from Nyame (God)

=== Matrilineality ===
Many but not all of the Akan still practice their traditional matrilineal customs, living in their traditional extended family households. The traditional Akan economic and political organization is based on matrilineal lineages, which are the basis of inheritance and succession. A lineage is defined as all those related by matrilineal descent from a particular ancestress. Several lineages are grouped into a political unit headed by a council of elders, each of whom is the elected head of a lineage – which itself may include multiple extended-family households.

Public offices are, thus, vested in the lineage, as are land tenure and other lineage property. In other words, lineage property is inherited only by matrilineal kin. Each lineage controls the lineage land farmed by its members, functions together in the veneration of its ancestors, supervises marriages of its members, and settles internal disputes among its members.

The political units above are likewise grouped (into traditionally seven) but as of today, eight larger groups called abusua: Aduana, Agona, Asakyiri, Asenie, Asona, Bretuo, Ekuona, and Oyoko. The members of each such abusua are united by their belief that they are all descended from the same ancient ancestress – so marriage between members of the same group (or abusua) is forbidden, a taboo on marriage. One inherits or is a lifelong member of, the lineage, the political unit and the abusua of one's mother, regardless of one's gender or marriage. Members and their spouses thus belong to different abusuas, with mother and children living and working in one household, and their husband/father living and working in a different household.

According to one source of information about the Akan, "A man is strongly related to his mother's brother (wɔfa) but only weakly related to his father's brother. This is perhaps viewed in the context of a polygamous society in which the mother/child bond is likely to be much stronger than the father/child bond. As a result, in inheritance, a man's nephew (his sister's son) (wɔfase) will have priority over his own son. Uncle-nephew relationships, therefore, assume a dominant position."

"The principles governing inheritance, generation, and age – that is to say, men come before women and seniors before juniors." [...] When a woman's brothers are available, a consideration of generational seniority stipulates that the line of brothers be exhausted before the right to inherit lineage property passes down to the next senior genealogical generation of sisters' sons. Finally, "it is when all possible male heirs have been exhausted that the females" may inherit.

Certain other aspects of the Akan culture are determined patrilineally rather than matrilineally. There are ancestrally 12 patrilineal Ntoro (spirit) groups, and everyone belongs to his or her father's Ntoro group, but not to his family lineage and abusua. Each Ntoro group has its own surnames, taboos, ritual purifications, and forms of etiquette. A person thus inherits one's Ntoro from one's father but does not belong to his family.

A recent (2001) book provides an update on the Akan, stating that some families are changing from the above abusua structure to the nuclear family. Housing, childcare, education, daily work, and elder care, etc. are then handled by that individual family, rather than by the abusua or clan, especially in the city. The above taboo on marriage within one's abusua is sometimes ignored, but "clan membership" is still important, with many people still living in the abusua framework presented above.

== Notable individuals of Akan origin ==
- Cardinal Peter Appiah Turkson - Cardinal of the Roman Catholic Church
- Michael Essien - Football - Ghana National team - Chelsea in the premier league of England
- Kofi Annan (1938–2018) – the first black man to head the United Nations. He was awarded the Nobel Prize
- Efua Sutherland – Celebrated playwright, dramatist, and children's author
- Kwame Nkrumah (1909–1972) – started the pan-African movement, which liberated many states from European colonialism.
- Arthur Wharton (1865–1930) – the first black professional footballer in the world.
- Harriet Tubman (1822–1913) – American abolitionist and military leader, famous for conducting the Underground Railroad, social activist, suffragist.

== Gallery ==
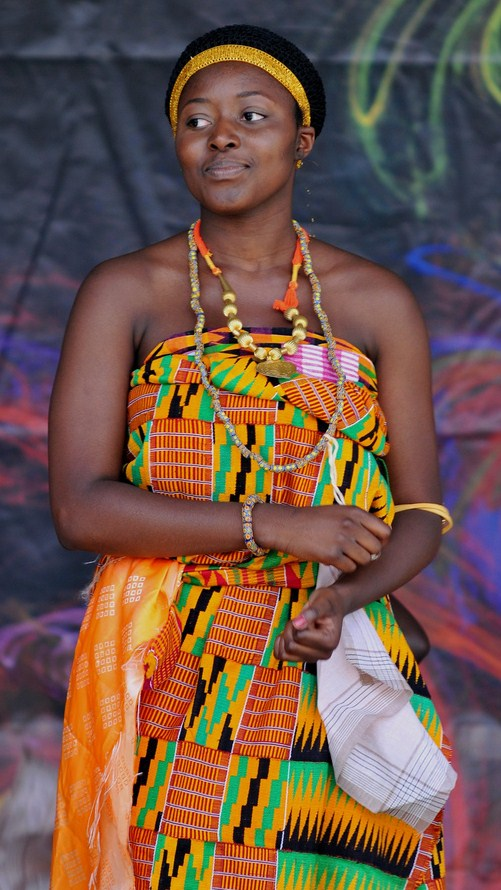
Akan Woman.

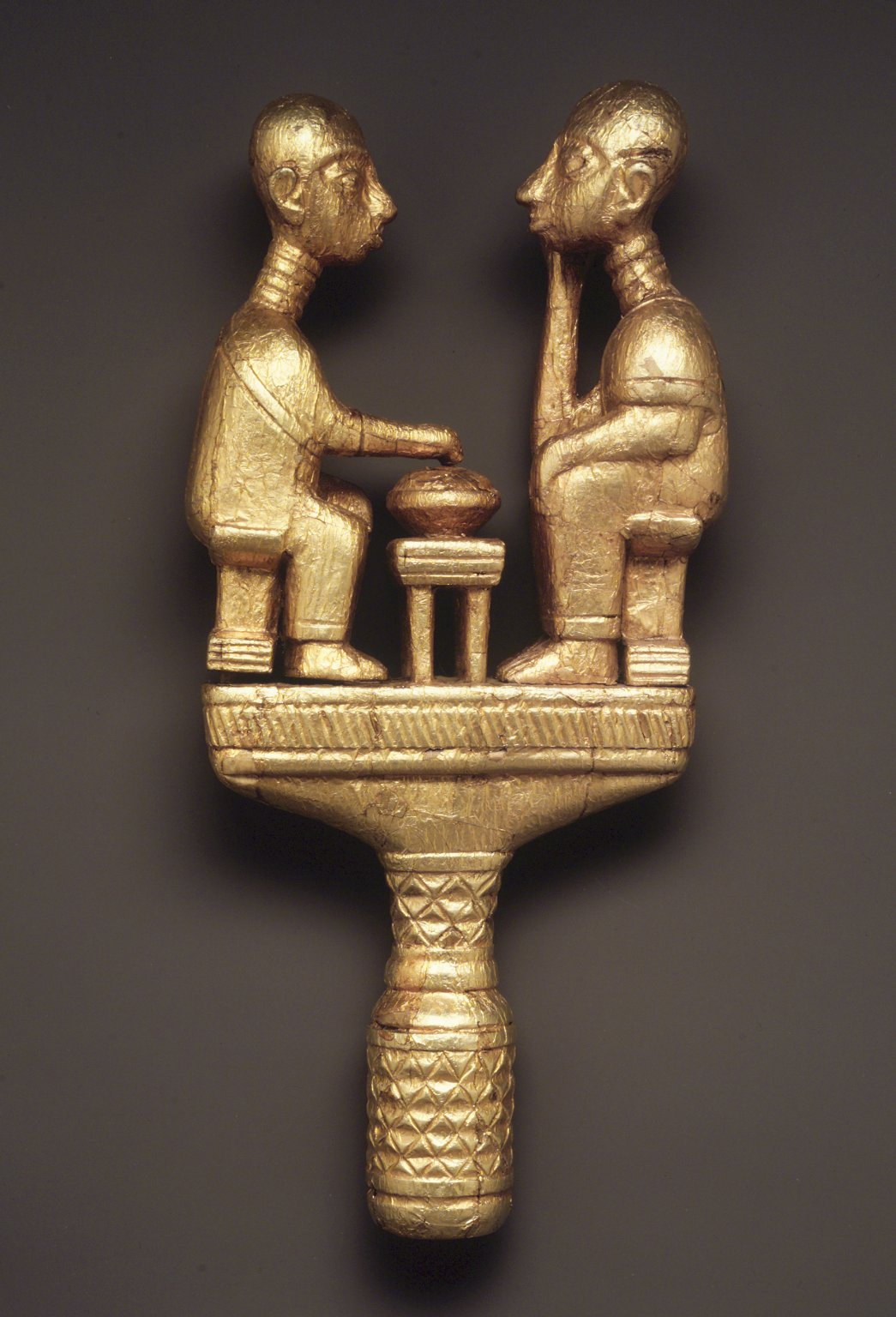
Akan metalwork from the Brooklyn Museum, New York City, United States.

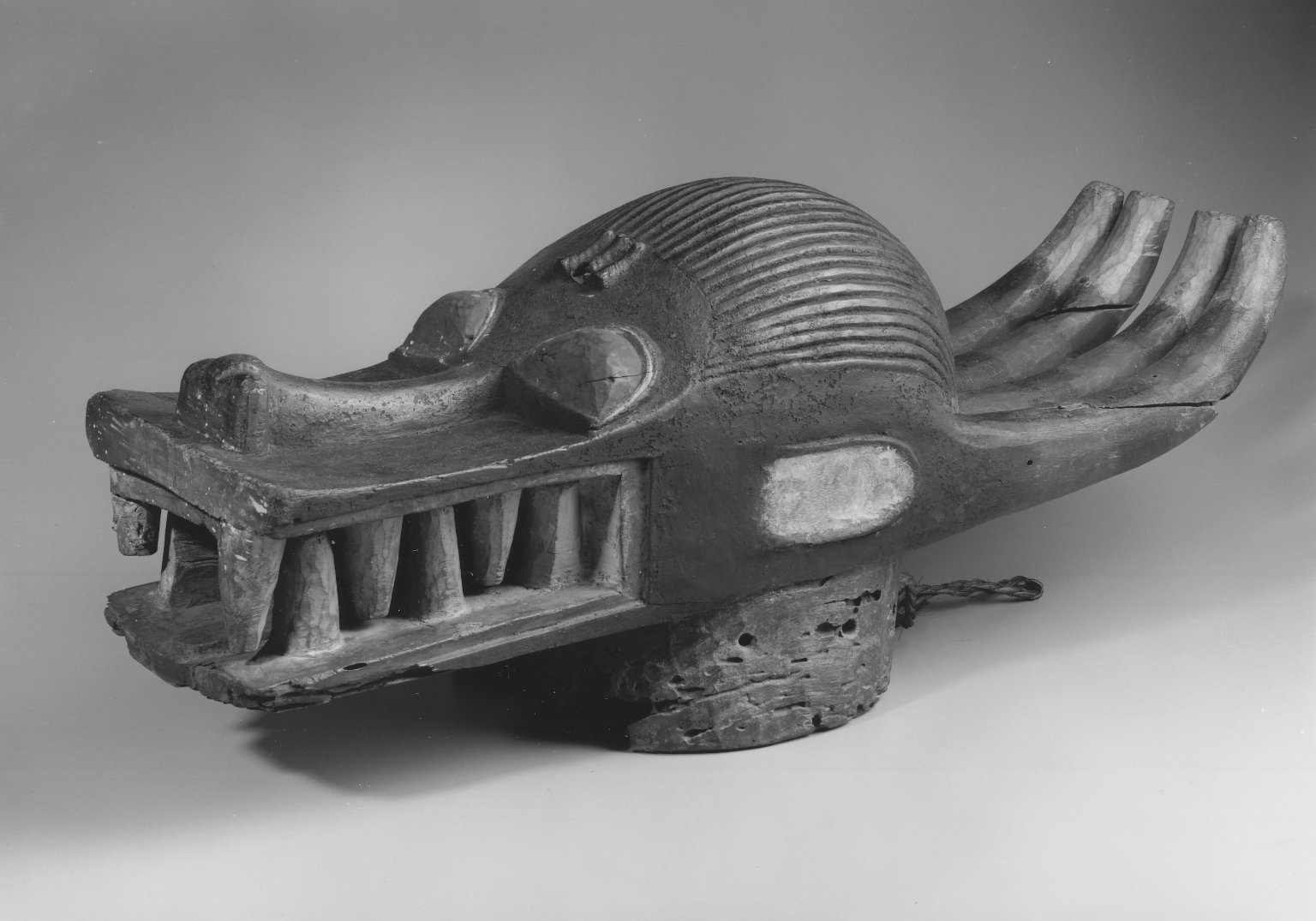
Mask (Bo Nun Amuin), from the early 20th century.

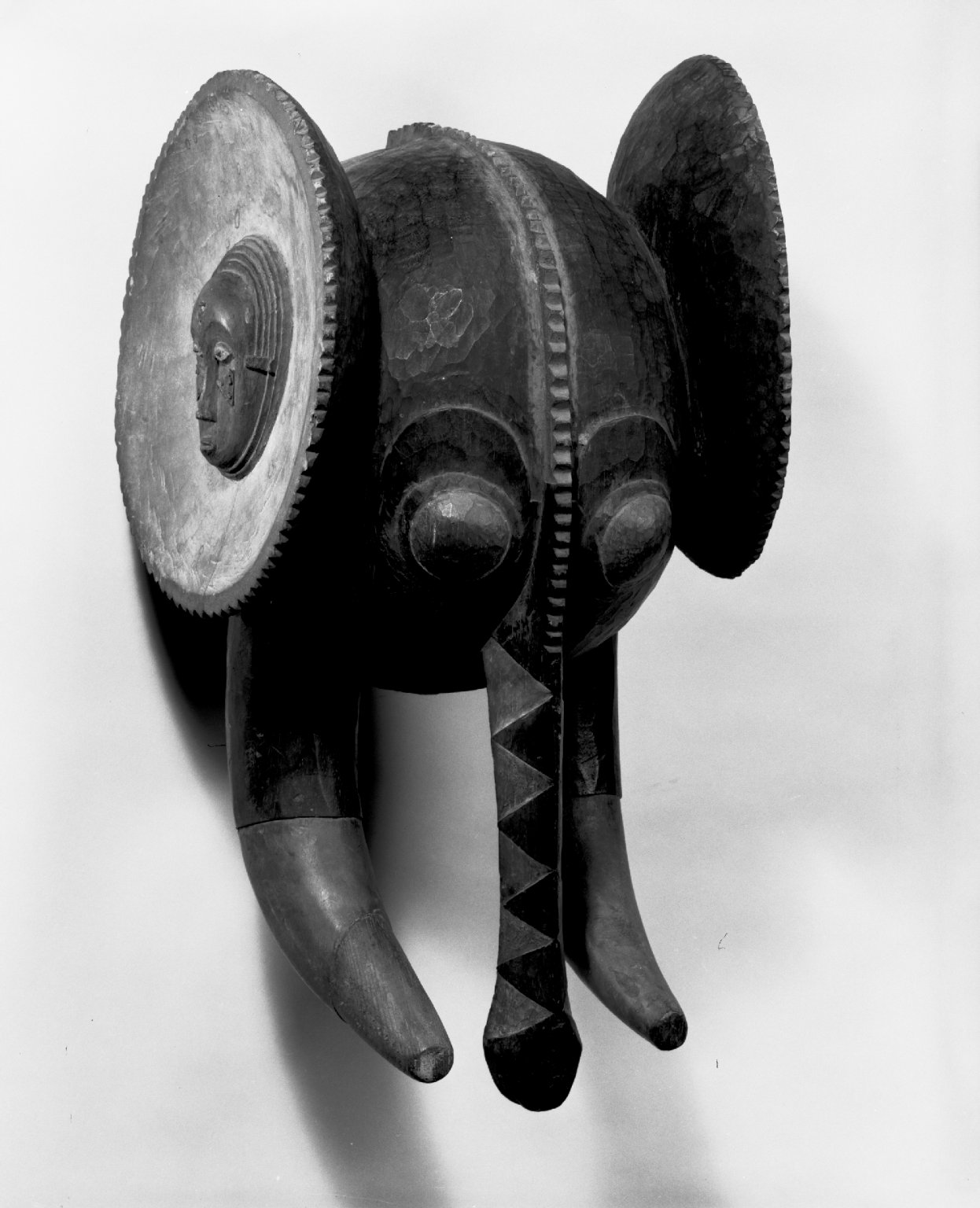
Wooden mask of an elephant.

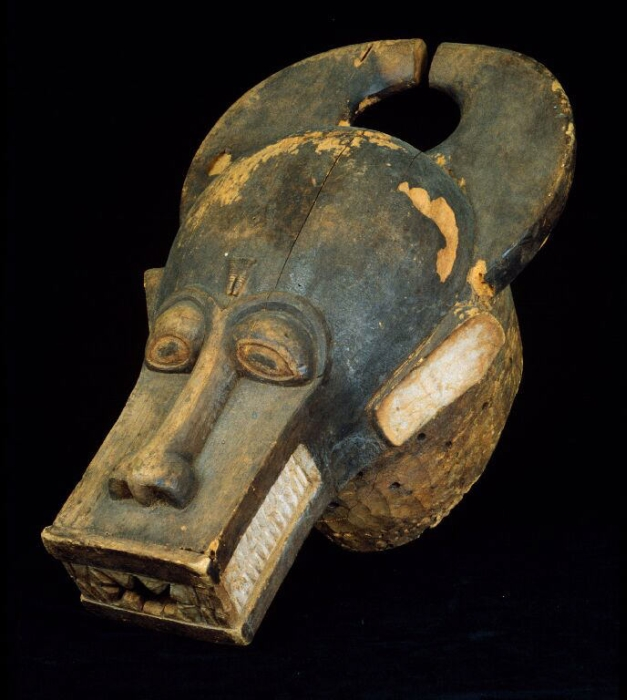
Wooden mask of a forest god.

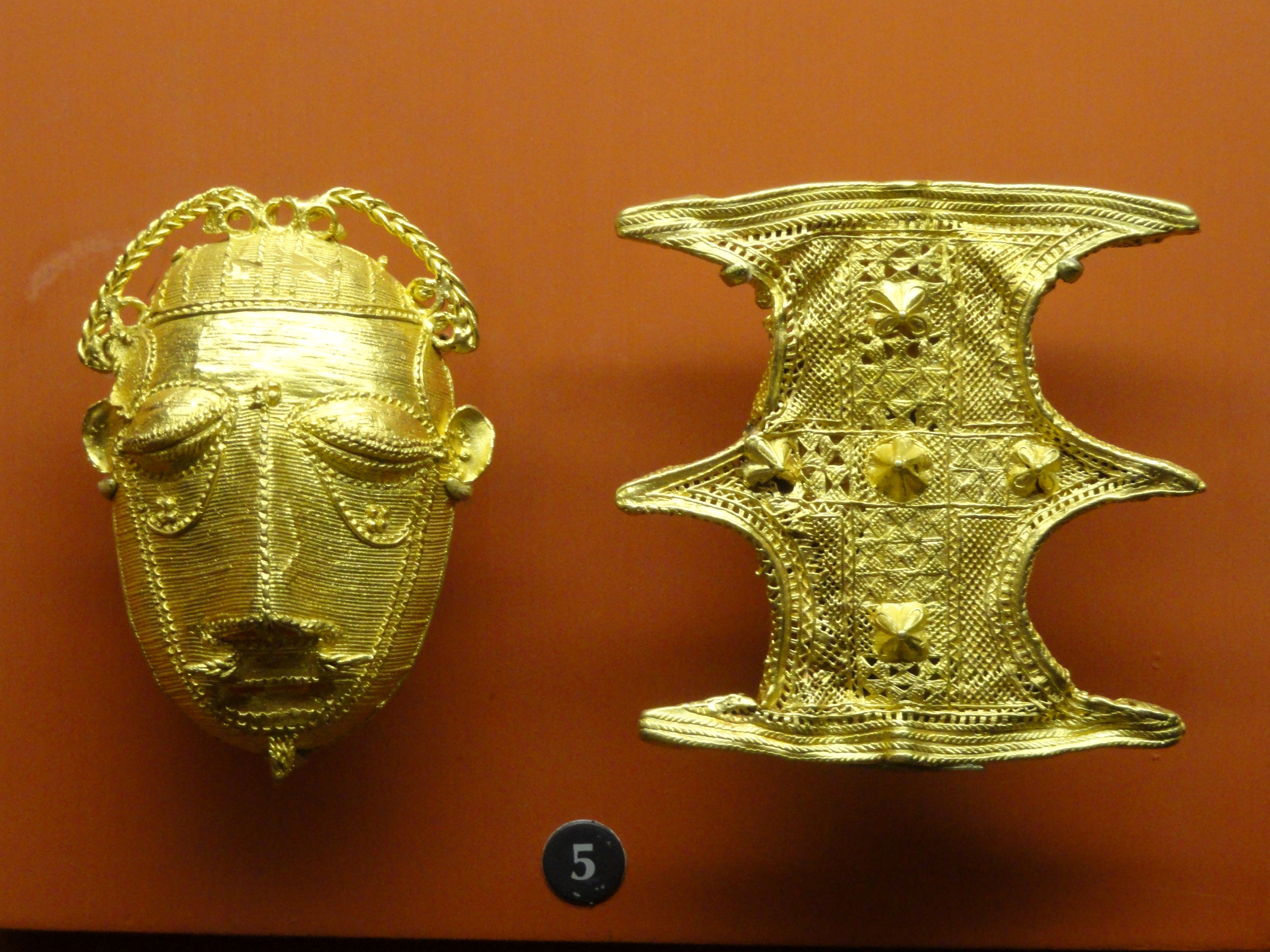
Empire of Ashanti warrior military golden war combat helmet and personal armour of the Empire of Ashanti – Museum of Natural History.

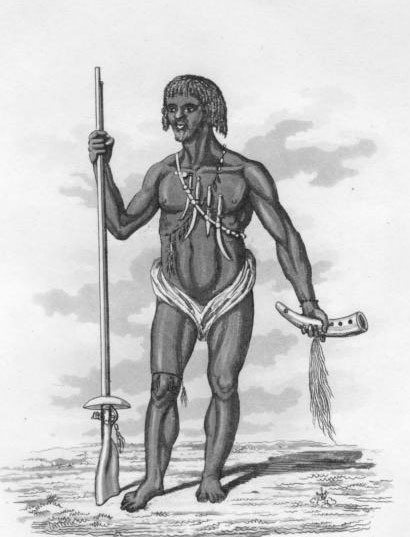
Empire of Ashanti scout, c. 1824, Visual Art – Joseph Dupuis.

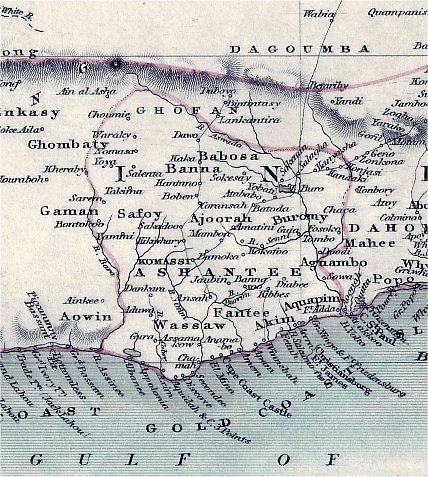
Empire of Ashanti and the Gold Coast map.

Diachronic map showing "Akan-held territory Ashantiland" Sovereign nation state and territorial entity with pre-colonial states and cultures of Africa (spanning roughly 500 BCE to 1500 CE). This map is "an artistic interpretation" using multiple and disparate sources.

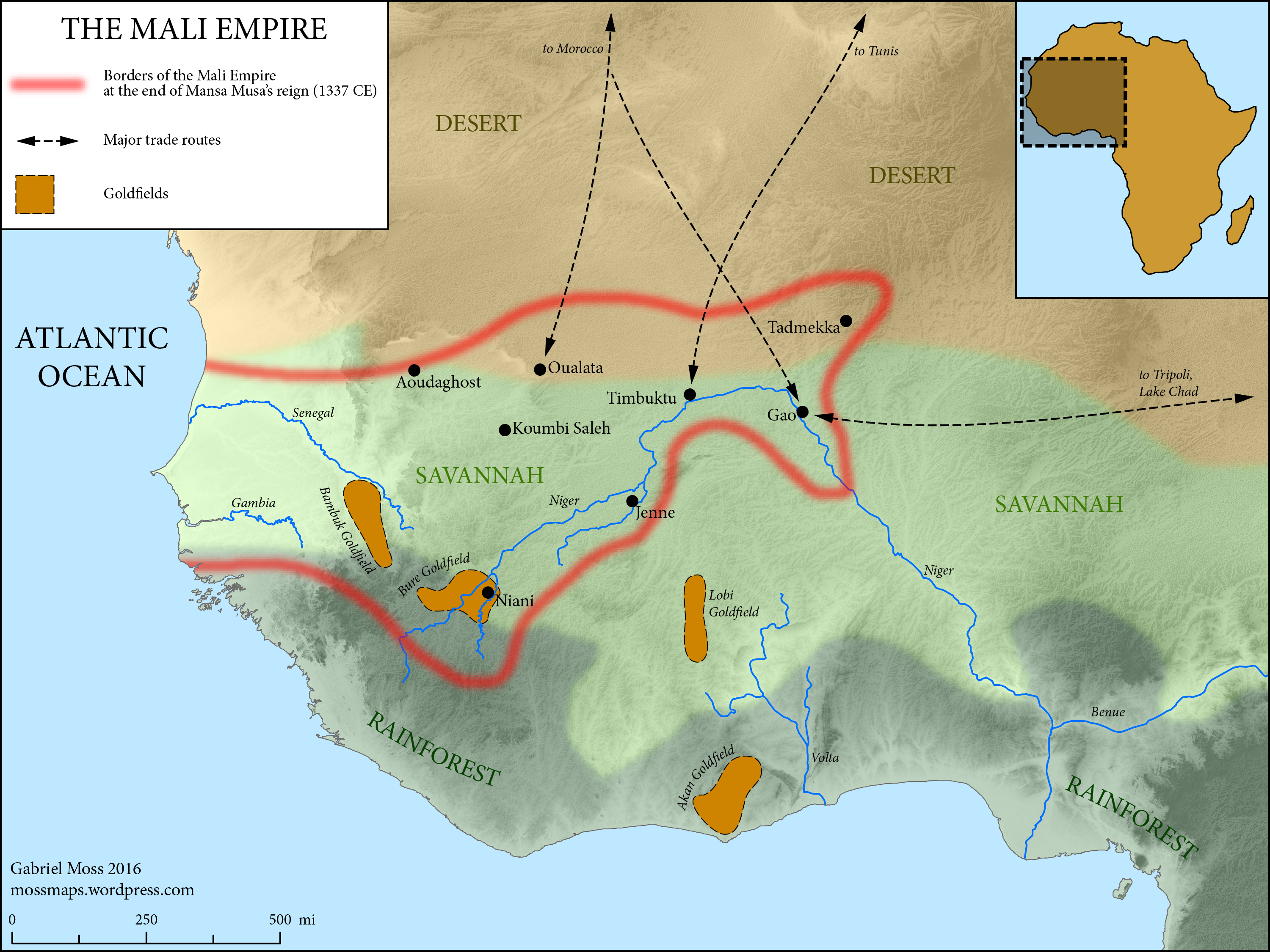
The Mali Empire in 1337, including the location of the Bambuk, Bure, Lobi and Akan Goldfields

== See also ==
- Akan clans
- Akan language
- Akan religion
- Adanse
- Akyem Kingdoms
- Akwamu Empire
- Asante Empire
- Asante people
- Kingdom of Aowin
- Bono State
- Fante Confederacy
- Saso people

== Sources ==
- Tait, David (1953). "10". Man. 53: 11–12. doi:10.2307/2793905. JSTOR 2793905.
- Wilks, Ivor (1957). "The Rise of the Akwamu Empire, 1650–1710". Transactions of the Historical Society of Ghana. 3 (2): 25–62. JSTOR 41405705.
- Goody, Jack (1968). "The Myth of a State". The Journal of Modern African Studies. 6 (4): 461–473. JSTOR 159327.
- Daaku, Kwame Yeboa (1970). Trade and Politics on the Gold Coast, 1600–1720: A Study of the African Reaction to European Trade. Oxford: Clarendon Press. ISBN 019821653X.
- Boaten, Kwasi (1971). "The Asante Before 1700". Institute of African Studies Research Review. 8 (1): 50–65. Archived from the original on 27 May 2025.
- Boahen, A. Adu (1973). "Arcany or Accany or Arcania and the Accanists". Transactions of the Historical Society of Ghana. 14: 105–110. JSTOR 41405842.
- Daaku, K. Y. (1973). "A History of Sefwi: A Survey of Oral Evidence". Research Review. NS. 9 (3): 32–36. Archived from the original on 29 May 2025.
- Effah-Gyamfi, E. (1974). "Aspects of the Archaeology and Traditions of the Bono State". Transactions of the Historical Society of Ghana. 15 (2): 217–227. JSTOR 41406570.
- Wilks, Ivor (1975). Asante in the nineteenth century : the structure and evolution of a political order. London, New York: Cambridge University Press. ISBN 978-0-521-20463-7.
- Warren, Dennis M. (1976). "The Use and Misuse of Ethnohistorical Data in the Reconstruction of Techiman-Bono (Ghana) History". Ethnohistory. 23 (4). Duke University Press: 365–385. JSTOR 481652.
- Arhin, Kwame (1979). A Profile of Brong Kyempim: Essays on the Archaeology, History, Language and Politics of the Brong Peoples of Ghana. Accra: Institute of African Studies, University of Ghana.
- Levtzion, N. (1973). Ancient Ghana and Mali. London: Methuen.
- Terray, Emmanuel (1982). "L'économie politique du royaume abron du Gyaman" [Political Economy of the Brong Kingdom of Gyaman]. Cahiers d'Études Africaines. 22 (87/88): 251–275. doi:10.3406/cea.1982.3378. JSTOR 4391810.
- Anquandah, James (1982). Rediscovering Ghana's Past. Harlow, Essex & Accra: Longman. ISBN 978-0-582-64309-3.
- Posnansky, Merrick (1982). "Archaeological and Linguistic Reconstruction in Ghana". In Ehret, Christopher; Posnansky, Merrick (eds.). The Archaeological and Linguistic Reconstruction of African History. Berkeley: University of California Press. pp. 253–270.
- Boachie-Ansah, James (1986). An Archaeological Contribution to the History of Wenchi. Legon, Ghana: University of Ghana, Department of Archaeology. p. 303. OCLC 18431720.
- Fynn, J. K. (1987). "The Political System of the Fante of Ghana during the Pre-Colonial Period". Unwersitas (University of Ghana, Legon). 9.
- Andah, B. W.; Anquandah, J. (1988). "17". In El Fasi, M.; Hrbek, I. (eds.). The Guinean Belt: The Peoples Between Mount Cameroon and the Ivory Coast. Paris: UNESCO. pp. 489–. ISBN 9789231017100. OCLC 17483588.
- Handloff, Robert Earl, ed. (1988). Cote d'Ivoire: a country study. Washington, D.C.: Federal Research Division, Library of Congress. OCLC 44238009. This article incorporates text from this source, which is in the public domain.
- Buah, F.K (1998). A History of Ghana. London: MacMillan. ISBN 9780333659342.
- Kea, Ray A. (2000). City-State Culture on the Gold Coast: The Fante City-State Federation in the Seventeenth and Eighteenth Centuries. Historisk-filosofiske Skrifter. Vol. 18. The Royal Danish Academy of Sciences and Letters.
- Stahl, Ann Brower (2001). Making History in Banda: Anthropological Visions of Africa's Past. New Studies in Archaeology. Cambridge: Cambridge University Press. ISBN 9781139428866.
- Shinnie, Peter (2005). "Early Asante and European Contacts". Journal des Africanistes. 75 (2): 25–42. doi:10.4000/africanistes.113.
- McCaskie, T. C. (2007). "Denkyira in the Making of Asante c. 1660–1720". The Journal of African History. 48 (1): 1–25. doi:10.1017/S0021853706002507. JSTOR 4501014.
- Konadu, Kwasi (2010). The Akan Diaspora in the Americas. Oxford: Oxford University Press. doi:10.1093/acprof:oso/9780195390643.001.0001. ISBN 9780195390643.
- Ofosu-Mensah, Ababio Emmanuel (2010). "Traditional Gold Mining in the Akan States of Ghana: A Case Study of the Adanse and Amansie Areas". Nordic Journal of African Studies. 19 (2): 124–147.
- Shumway, Rebecca (2011). The Fante and the Transatlantic Slave Trade. Rochester: University of Rochester Press. ISBN 9781580463911.
- Anquandah, James (2013). "The People of Ghana: Their Origins and Cultures". Transactions of the Historical Society of Ghana (15): 1–25. ISSN 0855-3246. JSTOR 43855009.
- Agyemang, Joseph Kwadwo; Ofosu-Mensah, Ababio Emmanuel; Gyamerah, Ebenezer Yaw (June 2013). "The Impact of Colonial Rule on the Gyaman State". History Research. 3 (6): 389–405.
- Manning, Katie; Timpson, Adrian (2014). "The demographic response to Holocene climate change in the Sahara". Quaternary Science Reviews. 101: 28–35. Bibcode:2014QSRv..101...28M. doi:10.1016/j.quascirev.2014.07.003.
- Posnansky, Merrick (2015). "Begho: Life and Times". Journal of West African History. 1 (2): 95–118. doi:10.14321/jwestafrihist.1.2.0095. ISSN 2327-1868. JSTOR 10.14321/jwestafrihist.1.2.0095. S2CID 193121437.
- Konadu, Kwasi; Campbell, Clifford C. (2016). The Ghana Reader: History, Culture, Politics. Duke University Press. ISBN 9780822359845.
- Compton, Anne M. (2017). Excavations at Kranka Dada: An Examination of Daily Life, Trade, and Ritual in the Bono Manso Region. BAR International Series. Vol. 2857. BAR Publishing. ISBN 9781407315843.
- Shriner, Daniel; Rotimi, Charles N. (5 April 2018). "Whole-Genome-Sequence-Based Haplotypes Reveal Single Origin of the Sickle Allele during the Holocene Wet Phase". American Journal of Human Genetics. 102 (4): 547–556. doi:10.1016/j.ajhg.2018.02.003. PMC 5985360. PMID 29526279.
- Konadu, Kwasi (2022). "A Manden Myth in the Akan Forests of Gold". African Economic History. 50 (2): 64–86. doi:10.3368/aeh.50.2.64.
- Kumah, Daniel (2024). "Early Trade and Urbanization in Pre-Modern Ghana: Evidence from Begho ca 1000 to 1700 AD". In Akurang-Parry, Kwabena O.; Biveridge, Fritz (eds.). History, Culture and Heritage of Ghana: Essays in Honour of Professor Robert Addo-Fening. Yaoundé: Langaa RPCIG. pp. 165–200. ISBN 978-9956-553-68-6.

== Sources ==
- Shinnie, Peter L.; Shinnie, Ama (1995). Early Asante. Calgary: Department of Archaeology, University of Calgary.
