= Nyarko =

Nyarko is a West African surname most common in Ghana, with a distribution of approximately one person named Nyarko per 330 Ghanaians. Notable people with the surname include:

- Alex Nyarko (born 1973), Ghanaian footballer
- Kobina Nyarko (born 1972), Ghanaian artist
- Martin Osei Nyarko (born 1985), Ghanaian footballer
- Patrick Nyarko (born 1986), Ghanaian footballer
- Philomena Nyarko, Ghanaian statistician and academic
- Richard Nyarko (born 1984), Ghanaian footballer
