= Edwin Jackson Anafi Asomaning =

Ghanaian plant pathologist

- Born: Edwin Jackson Anafi Asomaning; 21 September 1930; Gold Coast
- Died: 26 April 2001 (aged 70)
- Occupation: Plant Pathologist

Academic background
- Education: Accra Academy
- Alma mater: Iowa State University (BS 1956); Yale University (PhD 1961)

Edwin Jackson Anafi Asomaning (21 September 1930 – 13 May 2001) was a Ghanaian plant pathologist who was Director of the Cocoa Research Institute of Ghana from 1965 to 1980. He was elected a fellow of the Ghana Academy of Arts and Sciences in 1970.

== Early life and education ==
Edwin Asomaning was born on 21 September 1930 at Sra in Somanya to Charles Kwadwo Asomaning and Matilda Owiredua. His father when he was eleven years of age became Nana Frempong Manso II, Omanhene (Paramount Chief) of the Akim Kotoku Traditional Area in the Eastern Region of Ghana.

Asomaning had his elementary school education at the Presbyterian junior schools in Sra and Akyem Awisa, and in 1942 continued to the Oda Government School where he sat the Middle School Leaving Examination. Asomaning attended the Accra Academy from 1946 to 1950. After this, he worked at the Department of Audit and then the Department of Education as a clerical officer. In 1953, he was granted a scholarship to attend Iowa State University in Ames, where he obtained a Bachelor of Science degree in biology in 1956. He enrolled at Yale University and studied for a master's and a doctoral degree in plant physiology. He undertook post-doctoral work at Long Ashton Research Station in Bristol in the United Kingdom.

== Career ==
After his studies abroad, he joined the staff of the West African Cocoa Research Institute (WACRI), now known as the Cocoa Research Institute of Ghana (CRIG) in Tafo in the Eastern Region of Ghana. In 1965, Asomaning was appointed the institute's director. In 1970, he was elected a fellow of the Ghana Academy of Arts and Sciences. In February 1979, he retired as director of the institute.

In 1980, Asomaning was offered an appointment at Cocoa House in Accra as a Special Advisor to the Ghana Cocoa Board (COCOBOD), a position he held for a year before resigning. In retirement, he went into private farming and served on the boards of the Ghana Cocoa Board, the Oil Palm Research Institute of Kusi (of which he was chairman) and the Asua Pra Rural Bank of Afosu (only the 3rd rural bank in Ghana at the time). He also was the Ombudsman for the Ghana Oil Palm Development Corporation outgrowers at Kwae in the Eastern Region.

In 1985, the Provisional National Defence Council (PNDC) government appointed him as a member of the National Economic Commission which it set up.
