= Akyem Kotoku =

Traditional kingdom in Ghana

Coordinates: 5°55′12″N 0°59′24″W

Akyem Kotoku is a traditional kingdom in Eastern Ghana. It dates back to at least the 16th century, and its capital is and was Akyem Oda.

Akyen Kotoku is one of the three independent states along with Akyem Bosome and Akyem Abuakwa that forms the Akyem Mansa. This nation state with a non contiguous land mass exists in the Eastern and Ashanti region of Ghana.

== History ==
According to tradition, the founder of Akyem Kotoku hailed from the Agona clan, and migrated from Adansi to Ahwiren, and then to Adupon near the Konongo-Agogo road. By the seventeenth century the state had been established between the Pra River and Lake Bosumtwi.

== See also ==
- Akan people
- List of rulers of the Akan state of Akyem Kotoku
- Rulers of Ghana
- Gold Coast
