= Agona (clan) =

One of the eight Akan clans

The Agona Clan is one of the eight major Akan clans. According to tradition, the founders of Akyem Kotoku and Akyem Bosome came from the Agona clan, as well as that of Denkyira.

== Totem ==
The totem of the Agona people is the parrot, hence their linguistic prowess.

== Major towns ==
The Denkyirahene is from the Agona clan.
