= List of rulers of the Akan state of Akyem Bosume =

Akyem Bosome describes a traditional geo political entity. A state with a non contiguous land mass that exists today in the Eastern and Ashanti region of Ghana.

The capital of the present date nation state of Akyem Bosome is Akyem Swedru.

It was founded in 1831 through a purchase of land by Bosompem Ntow II from the family of Barim Atwere of Aduasa.

After the acquisition of the land by Bosompem Ntow II, the Bosome people then migrated from the area around present day lake Bosomtwi to take possession of the land.

== List of rulers of the Akan state of Akyem Bosume ==
Tenure	Incumbent	Notes
Bosumehene (rulers)
ante/c.1831 to post/c.1860	Nana Koragye Ampaw, Bosumehene
post/c.1860 to ante/c.1900	Nana Bosompem Ntow II, Bosumehene
ante/c.1900 to post/c.1960	Nana Oware Agyekum II, Bosumehene

== See also ==
- Akan people
- Ghana
- Gold Coast
- Lists of incumbents
