= Akyem Bosome =

Traditional kingdom in Ghana

Akyem Bosome is a traditional kingdom in Eastern Ghana. It dates from at least the 16th century, and its capital is and was Akyem Swedru. It is the smallest of the three Akyem states, including Akyem Abuakwa and Akyem Kotoku, that form the Akyem Mansa.

== History ==
According to tradition, the founder of Akyem Bosome, a member of the Agona clan, migrated from Adansi to settle in Ahwiren and then to Kotoku Omanso on Lake Bosomtwe. As a smaller state than its counterparts, it was tributary of Denkyira throughout the 17th century, and then of Asante throughout the 18th century.

Other Bosome settlements are: Adiemra, Amantia, Anamaase, Aperade, Babianeha, Brenase, Ofoase. There are also the settlements of Adieto and Yaapisaa at Kokofu, Ehwuren and Atafram, all in the Ashanti Region, that owe allegiance to Akyem Bosome.

The traditional head of Akyem Bosome is the current Omanhene, Okotwaasuo Kantamanto Owoare Agyekum III. Subordinate to him are the "Adakrohene of Bosome"(?). These are the Ahenfo(?) of the other Bosome settlements.

== Politics ==
Some historical rulers of Bosome were Nana Koragye Ampaw and Nana Oware Agyekum II.

== See also ==
- Akan people
- Rulers of the Akan state of Akyem Bosume
- Rulers of Ghana
- Gold Coast region
