= Momome =

Female cleansing ritual in Ghana and Ivory Coast

Momome is a female cleansing ritual among some Akan groups in present-day Ghana and Ivory Coast. The ritual is aimed at cleansing the community from impending crisis. The momome ritual in the precolonial setting was held in response to wars, but in the 20th century it has been increasingly evoked in moments of crisis (illness, deposition, death) of prominent figures of the chiefly establishment.

== See also ==
- Apotropaic magic
- Religion in Ghana
- Religion in Ivory Coast
- Traditional African religions
