= Richard Nyarko =

Ghanaian footballer

Personal information
- Date of birth: 5 September 1984 (age 42)
- Place of birth: Ghana
- Height: 1.75 m (5 ft 9 in)
- Position: Midfielder

Team information
- Current team: FK Austria ASV Puch

Youth career
- 1999–2003: SK Sturm Graz

Senior career*
Years	Team	Apps	(Gls)
2003–2011	SK Sturm Graz II		
2003	SK Sturm Graz II	7	(0)
2004	→ SC Fürstenfeld (loan)		
2006	→ SC Fürstenfeld (loan)	11	(2)
2007	→ SV Oberglan (loan)		
2008	→ ESV Knittelfeld (loan)		
2009	→ Post SV Graz (loan)		
2011–	FK Austria ASV Puch		

International career
- Ghana U-17
- * Club domestic league appearances and goals

Richard Nyarko (born 5 September 1984, in Accra) is a Ghanaian footballer who is currently playing for FK Austria ASV Puch.

== Career ==
Nyarko start his career with Endtime Repentance FC. started his senior career in the reserve of Austrian side SK Sturm Graz, which loaned him second times to SC Fürstenfeld, and one times to SV Oberglan, ESV Knittelfeld and Post SV Graz. After twelve years with SK Sturm left the club and signed in summer 2011 with FK Austria ASV Puch.
