= Amowi =

Coordinates: 6°57′N 1°41′W

Amowi, also known as Amoawi, is a village in Offinso, Ashanti Region, Ghana. The population is approximately 500. The nearest city is Kumasi, 50 km away.
