= Sunsum =

Spirit in Akan

In the spiritual practices of the Ashanti people and Akan people, the sunsum is one's spirit. The sunsum is what connects the body (honam) to the soul (kra). The sunsum can be transmitted in a variety of ways, including from father to son during conception. This power is used to protect the carriers of this spirit. When a man dies, the sunsum returns to the metaphorical house of the father in wait to be reincarnated in the next son born of the men of that family.

Another form of sunsum is the spiritual power that the Akan believe allows the possessors to practice witchcraft. This is called sunsum fee, or "dirty spirit". Unlike the genetic sunsum discussed before, this is a power that is willingly passed down, often by grandparents to grandchildren they feel deserve the power to wield such magic. In this manner, the sunsum can remain alive and well through a lineage. As males possess a natural sunsum, if they gain a sunsum fee they are twice as spiritually powerful as a woman who only has witchcraft. Despite this, it is common belief that most witches are female among the Ashanti people and Akan, and they are believed to be so powerful that they can kill infants simply by hearing them cry.

== Cultural practices ==
The sunsum is a functionary of the kra, in that when Nyame gives kra at birth, it is the sunsum that escorts the kra. Therefore, the kra and the sunsum are purposeful counterparts of one another. The sunsum, in a sense, belongs to or exists in the material world and it become a functional part of man only when man has become a living soul. Sunsum is therefore a conscious counterpart of the soul of the Akan. Kra is worshipped; is given offerings. Among some of the Akan tribes each person has an altar for his kra. Sunsum is not worshipped. Sunsum is that part of the Akan which fights the evils which try to contaminate the kra. Sunsum tries to conquer the weaknesses to which the Akan is exposed.

== Sources ==
- Asante Molefi; African Intellectual Heritage 1996
- Gyekye Kwame; "An essay on African philosophical thought: the Akan conceptual scheme" 1995
- Ephirim-Donkor, Anthony; "African Religion Defined; A Systematic Study of Ancestor Worship among the Akan" 2nd Edition, 2013
