= Kra (mythology) =

Soul in Akan religion

In Akan spirituality, the kra is the soul of a person. It is of divine origin; that is to say, one gets their "Kra" from God (Nyame/Niamien).

An Akan conforms to the abusua/(Mogya (blood)) of his mother, and receives the Ntoro from his father. These maternal and paternal bonds follow the Akan wherever he/she travels. An Akan's Sunsum is their Spirit/personality which they develop through their interaction with the world.
