= Ahwiren =

Coordinates: 6°28′N 1°30′W

- Interactive map of Ahwiren
- Country: Ghana
- Region: Ashanti Region

Ahwiren is a town in the Ashanti Region of Ghana. The town is known for the Saint Joseph Secondary/Technical School. The school is a second cycle institution.
