= Ofusu Kwabi =

Ghanaian politician

Ofusu Kwabi (fl. 16th century) was a Ghanaian southern Akan leader. He was believed to have been a successor to Agyen Kokobo, founder of the Twifo-Heman kingdom. The dates of his leadership are uncertain; some say he ruled as early as around 1500 to 1520, but other sources have stated that he was around still in 1575, when he defeated Nzima (Simba) in the Ahweaban war.

== See also ==
- List of rulers of the Akan states of Akwamu and Twifo-Heman
