= History of military deception =

Examples of military deception from ancient times to the present include:

== Ancient Egypt ==
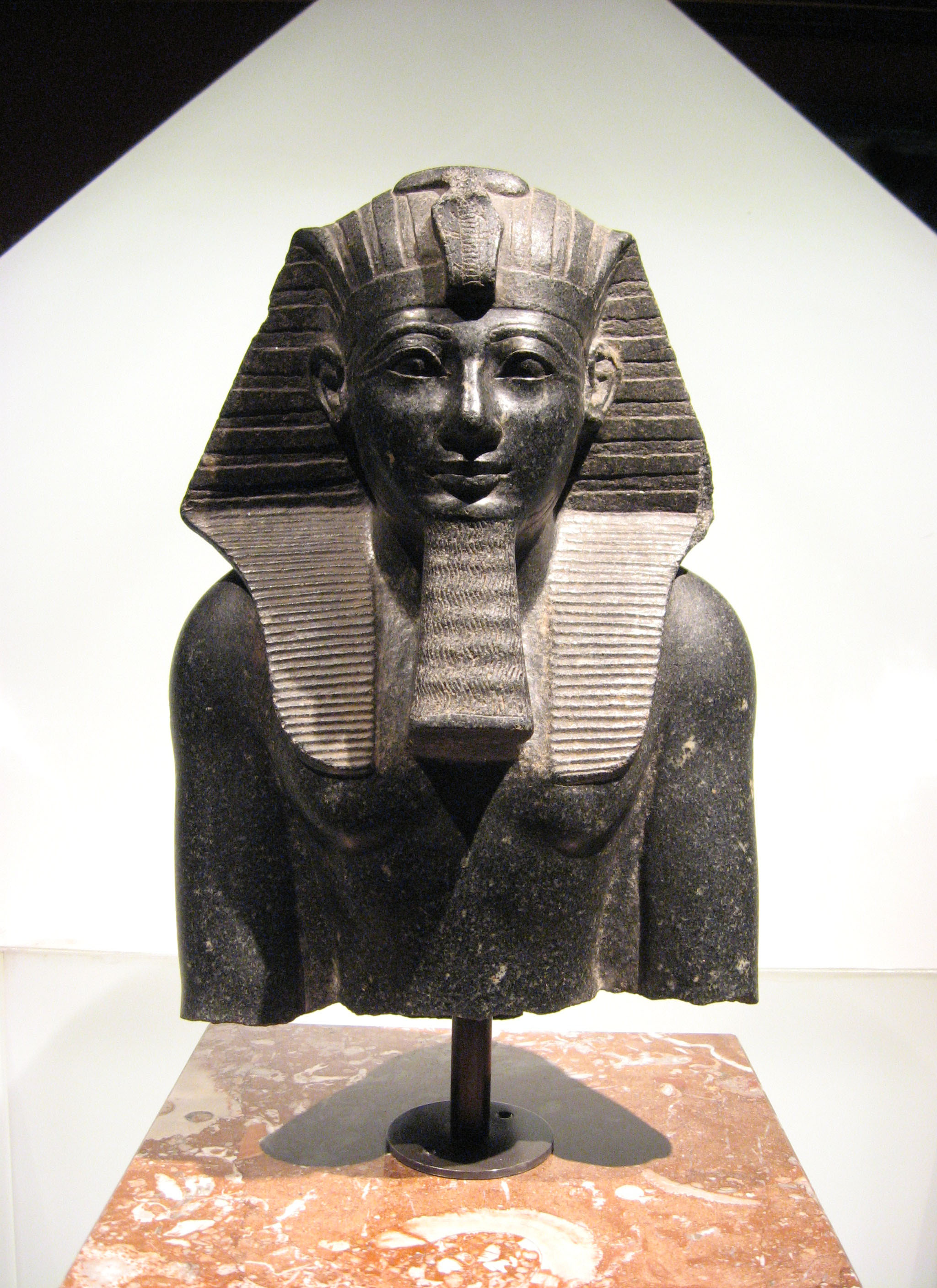
An early example of military deception was Thutmose III's capture of the Sinai city of Yapu

According to a story from an ancient Egyptian papyrus, in about 1450 BC, an Egyptian army under Pharaoh Thutmose III and his general Djehuty besieged the Caananite city of Yapu (later Joppa and now Jaffa). Unable to gain entry, they resorted to deception. Djehuty hid several soldiers in baskets and had the baskets delivered to the town with the message that the Egyptians were admitting defeat and sending tribute. The people of Yapu accepted the gift and celebrated the end of the siege. Once inside the city, the hidden soldiers emerged from the baskets, opened the city gates, and admitted the main Egyptian force. The Egyptians then conquered the city.

== Ancient Greece ==
The Iliad and The Odyssey, epic poems composed between the 9th and 6th centuries BC, are credited to the Ancient Greek author Homer. These poems contain details of the Trojan War, presumed by the Greeks to have been fought in approximately the 13th century BC. The Odyssey provides the details of the Trojan Horse, a successfully executed deception. After several years of stalemate, a Greek leader, Odysseus, devised a deception. Over three days, the Greeks constructed a hollow wooden horse, which they inscribed as an offering to the goddess Athena in prayer for safe return to their homes. The Greeks then pretended to depart the area around Troy, giving the impression that they had sailed for Greece. Rather than risk offending Athena, the Trojans brought the horse into the city. That night, Greek soldiers concealed inside the horse came out of their hiding place and opened the city gates. The main force of Greek soldiers who had actually remained nearby then entered the city and killed the inhabitants.

== Ancient China ==
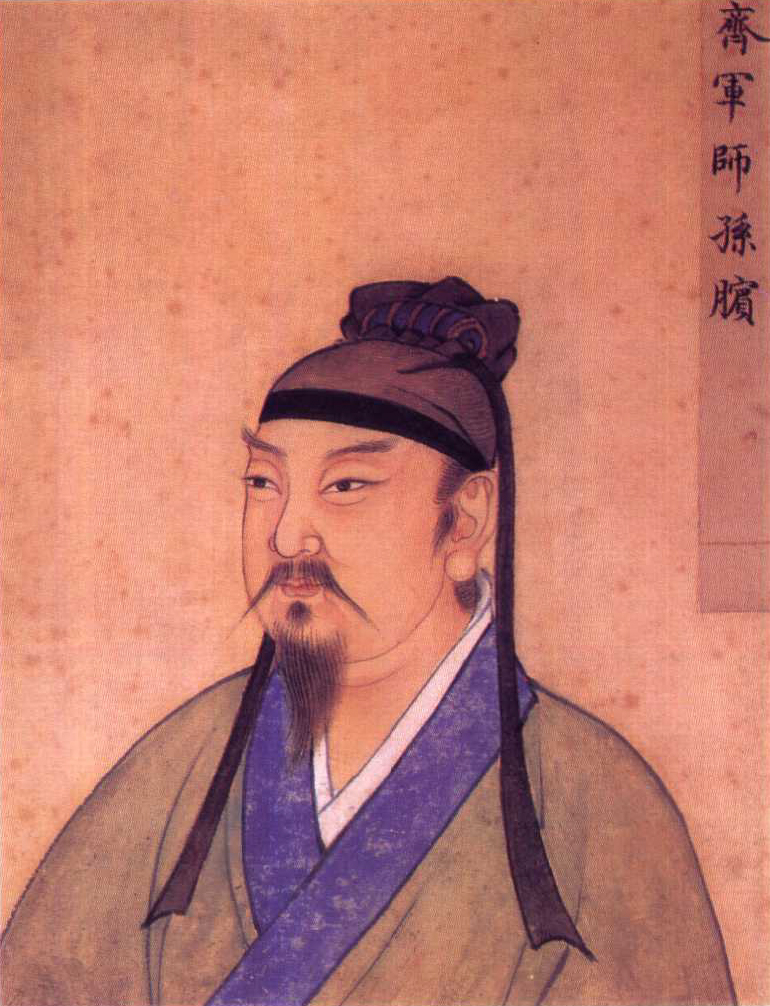
General Sun Bin of Qi successfully used deception in his kingdom's military operations

In 341 BC, troops under the general Sun Bin of the state of Qi faced battle with the forces of the state of Wei. Knowing that Wei regarded the army of Qi as inferior and cowardly, Sun Bin decided to use Wei's perception to his advantage. When Qi's forces invaded Wei, Sun Bin ordered them to light 100,000 camp fires on the first night. On the second night, they lit 50,000. On the third, 30,000. Sun Bin's deception caused the Wei forces led by general Pang Juan to believe Qi faced mass desertions. Rushing to attack what they believed to be an inferior army, the Wei forces assaulted Qi's troops at a narrow gorge, not knowing Sun Bin's soldiers had prepared it as an ambush site. When Pang Juan's troops reached the gorge they observed that a sign had been posted. Lighting a torch to see the message, the Wei commander read "Pang Juan dies beneath this tree". The lighting of the torch was the signal for Qi to initiate the ambush. Sun Bin's army quickly routed Pang Juan's and Pang Juan committed suicide.

== Ancient Carthage ==
During the Second Punic War, the Carthaginian general Hannibal employed deception during the Battle of Cannae in 216 BC. In preparing to face a Roman force led by Lucius Aemilius Paullus and Gaius Terentius Varro, Hannibal had 40,000 soldiers, as compared to the over 80,000 that had been amassed by Rome. To overcome the Roman advantage in numbers, Hannibal placed his less experienced and disciplined Gauls in the center of his formation, arranged to bulge out towards the Romans. On either side of his line, Hannibal positioned his experienced and disciplined Libyan and Gaetuli infantry. Hannibal intended for the Gauls to give way to the advancing Romans, with the center of his line bending but not breaking. Seeing the Gauls appear to retreat, the Romans would advance into the bowl shape or sack created by the bending of Hannibal's line. Once inside the sack, the African infantry positioned on the left and right would wheel inwards and attack the Roman flanks. In combination with the Carthaginian cavalry, the infantry on the flanks would continue moving until they encircled the Romans and could attack their rear. The battle unfolded as Hannibal had envisioned. Only 10,000 Romans escaped, with the rest either killed or captured. The battle came to be seen as evidence of Hannibal's genius for tactical generalship, while it was among the worst defeats suffered by Ancient Rome.

== Ancient Rome ==
During the Gallic Wars, in 52 BC Roman commander Julius Caesar attempted to engage the forces of tribal leader Vercingetorix in open battle in what is now central France. Vercingetorix kept the River Elave (now Allier) between Caesar's forces and his own. His troops destroyed or removed the bridges and mirrored the movements of Caesar's troops, preventing Caesar from crossing the river. Caesar responded by hiding forty of his sixty cohorts and arranging the remaining twenty to give the appearance of sixty as viewed from the opposite riverbank. The twenty cohorts continued to march along the river, and Vercingetorix's troops continued to mirror their movements. Caesar then led the forty hidden cohorts back to a repairable bridge, had it fixed, led his troops across, and sent for the other twenty cohorts to rejoin him. Now on the same side of the river as Vercingetorix, Caesar was able to engage the Gallic tribes in battle as he intended.

== Mongol Empire ==
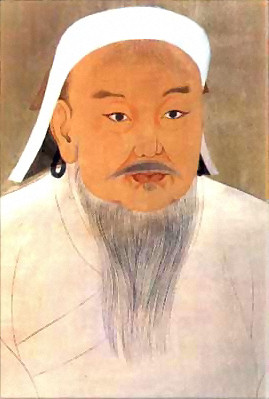
The Mongols, including Chinggis Khan, frequently employed deception in their military conquests

The Mongol Empire frequently used deception to aid its military success. A favored tactic was to exaggerate the size of their army, which would cause their enemies to surrender or flee. When he fought the Naimans in 1204, Chinggis Khan ordered his soldiers to light five campfires each, giving the impression of a more numerous army. In 1258 Möngke Khan invaded Sichuan with 40,000 soldiers, and spread rumors of 100,000 in an effort to intimidate his enemy.

When confronting numerically superior forces, the Mongols often sent troops behind their own lines to raise dust with branches tied to their horses' tails, which created the impression that reinforcements were en route. Mongol soldiers had more than one horse each, and to exaggerate the size of their army, they would compel prisoners or civilians to ride their spare horses within sight of the enemy, or mount dummies on their spare horses. To make their forces appear smaller, the Mongols would ride in single file, minimizing dust and making the hoofprints of their horses more difficult to count. Mongol armies also used the feigned retreat. A typical tactic was to deploy the mangudai, a vanguard unit that would charge the enemy, break up its formation, and then fall back in an attempt to draw the enemy into a position more favorable to the Mongols.

== Middle Ages ==
Examples of deception occurred during the Crusades. In 1271, Sultan Baybars captured the formidable Krak des Chevaliers by handing the besieged knights a letter, supposedly from their commander, ordering them to surrender. The letter was fake, but the knights believed it was genuine and capitulated.

== Renaissance ==
In an event from the early 1480s that was recounted in Washington Irving's Conquest of Granada, during the Granada War, the Alhama de Granada was besieged by Moors. During the siege, a portion of the fortress' outer wall was destroyed after the earth beneath it was washed away in a violent storm. To conceal the breach, the Conde de Tendilla, leader of the Spanish defenders, directed the erection of a cloth screen. The screen deceived the Moors because it was painted to resemble stone, and no Moorish besiegers ventured close enough to spot the fakery. The wall was repaired over the next several days, and the Moors did not learn of the gap in the Alhama's defenses.

== Colonial Africa ==
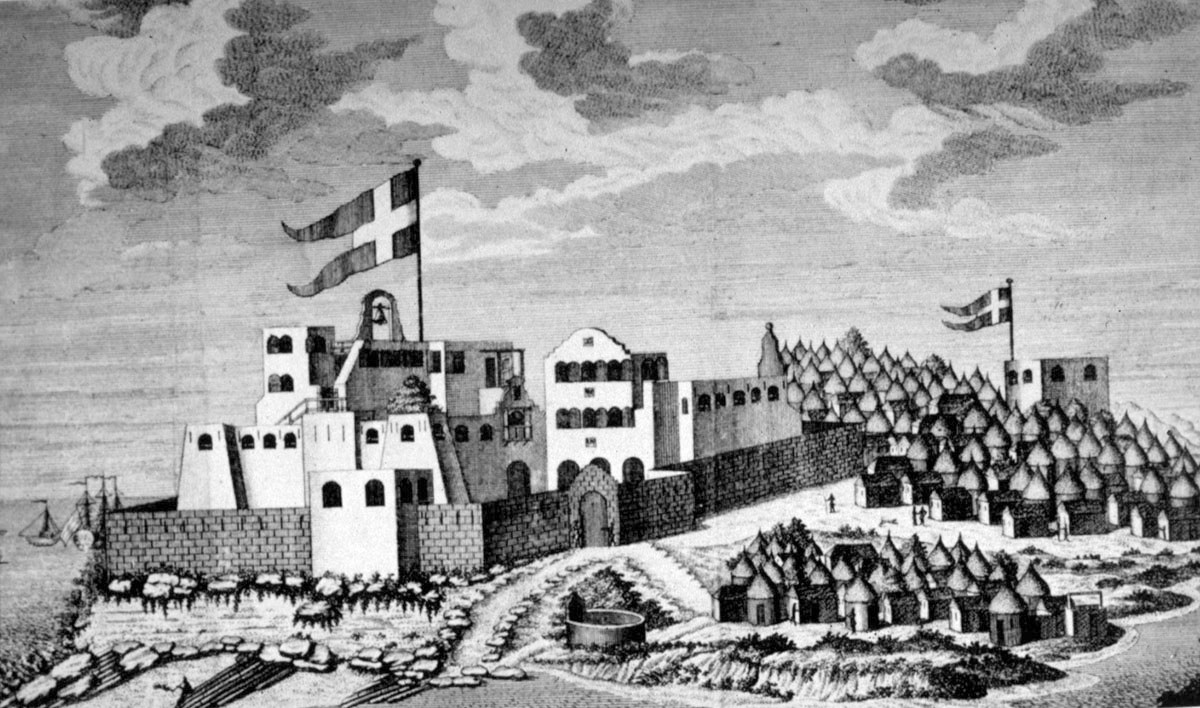
Deception enabled the Akwamu to seize Fort Christiansborg from its European owners, then sell it back at a profit

In 1659, the kingdom of Denmark–Norway constructed Fort Christiansborg near what is now Accra in Ghana. Used to control commerce in slaves, as well as raw materials including gold and ivory, the site changed hands several times between Denmark–Norway, Portugal, and Sweden, sometimes by force, sometimes by purchase. In 1692, Nana Asamani, the king of the Akwamu people, planned to capture the fort from Denmark–Norway. Disguising himself as a cook and interpreter, he obtained work at the fort, where over the next year he became proficient in the Danish language and conducted reconnaissance to learn about the activities of the facility's occupants and the people with whom they traded.

After gaining familiarity with Fort Christiansborg's occupants and operations, in 1693 Asamani informed the Danish traders who occupied it about a group of Akwamu who desired to purchase weapons and ammunition, and suggested they were so anxious to buy that the Danes should inflate their prices. Lured by the prospect of large profits, the Danes bartered with the 80 Akwamu that Asamani had brought to the fort. When the Danes allowed the Akwamu to inspect rifles and prepare to test-fire them, the Akwamu instead used the guns to commence an attack on the Danes. Caught by surprise, the Danes were quickly overpowered and ejected from Fort Christiansborg. The Akwamu occupied the post for a year before Asamani agreed to sell it back to Denmark–Norway. Asamani kept the keys as a trophy, and they are still in the possession of the Akwamu.

== French and Indian War ==
Diagram depicting British in red and French in blue as they were arrayed after the British used deception to gain an advantage prior to the Battle on the Plains of Abraham

During the Seven Years' War in North America (known in the United States as the French and Indian War), British commander James Wolfe attempted throughout the summer of 1759 to force French commander Louis-Joseph de Montcalm to come out of his well-defended position in Quebec City. When artillery fire that destroyed most of the city did not produce the desired effect, Wolfe employed a deception strategy called "uproar east, attack west" Wolfe ordered Admiral Charles Saunders to move the British fleet on the Saint Lawrence River to a position opposite one of Montcalm's main camps east of Quebec City. This demonstration gave the appearance of preparations for an upcoming attack. Montcalm was deceived, and moved troops to guard against a British assault from that location.

Wolfe's soldiers at Quebec City capitalized on the favorable balance of forces created by the deception. First, they opened a road from the riverbank to the city heights. Next, they deployed into battle formation on a farmer's field near the city walls. Caught by surprise, Montcalm knew he would not be able to withstand a siege and had no choice but to fight. On 13 September 1759, the French were decisively beaten in the Battle of the Plains of Abraham. The loss of Quebec led to defeat in the war and France was forced to cede Canada to the British.

== American Revolution ==
=== Siege of Boston ===
As head of the Continental Army, George Washington used deception in an effort to equalize the odds in the fight against the larger, better-equipped, and better-trained British army and its Hessian auxiliaries. During the siege of Boston from April 1775 to March 1776, the newly organized Continental Army suffered from numerous equipment and supply shortages. Among the most critical was a lack of gunpowder, which was so acute that in a battle, Washington's troops would be able to fire no more than nine bullets per man. To conceal their lack of gunpowder from the British, Washington's quartermaster soldiers filled gunpowder casks with sand and shipped them from Providence, Rhode Island to the Continental Army's depots. The deception convinced British commanders not to launch sorties during the siege.

=== Battle of Long Island ===
After the American defeat at the Battle of Long Island in late August 1776, Washington's forces retreated to Brooklyn Heights, with a superior British force surrounding them on three sides and their backs to the East River. The British expected Washington would find his position untenable and surrender. Washington instead arranged for a flotilla of small boats to ferry his 9,000 troops across the river to the relative safety of Manhattan Island. Moving under cover of darkness, Washington's troops withdrew unit by unit to avoid the appearance that a general retreat was taking place. The wheels of supply wagons and gun carriages were wrapped in rags to muffle their noise, and American troops were ordered to remain silent to avoid alerting nearby British forces. Rear guard units kept campfires blazing through the night. These measures led British scouts to assume the American army was still on Brooklyn Heights. A morning fog obscured visibility, which helped the Continentals complete their retreat, and all 9,000 were safely ferried across the river. When the British advanced, they found the American positions completely deserted.

=== Battle of Trenton ===
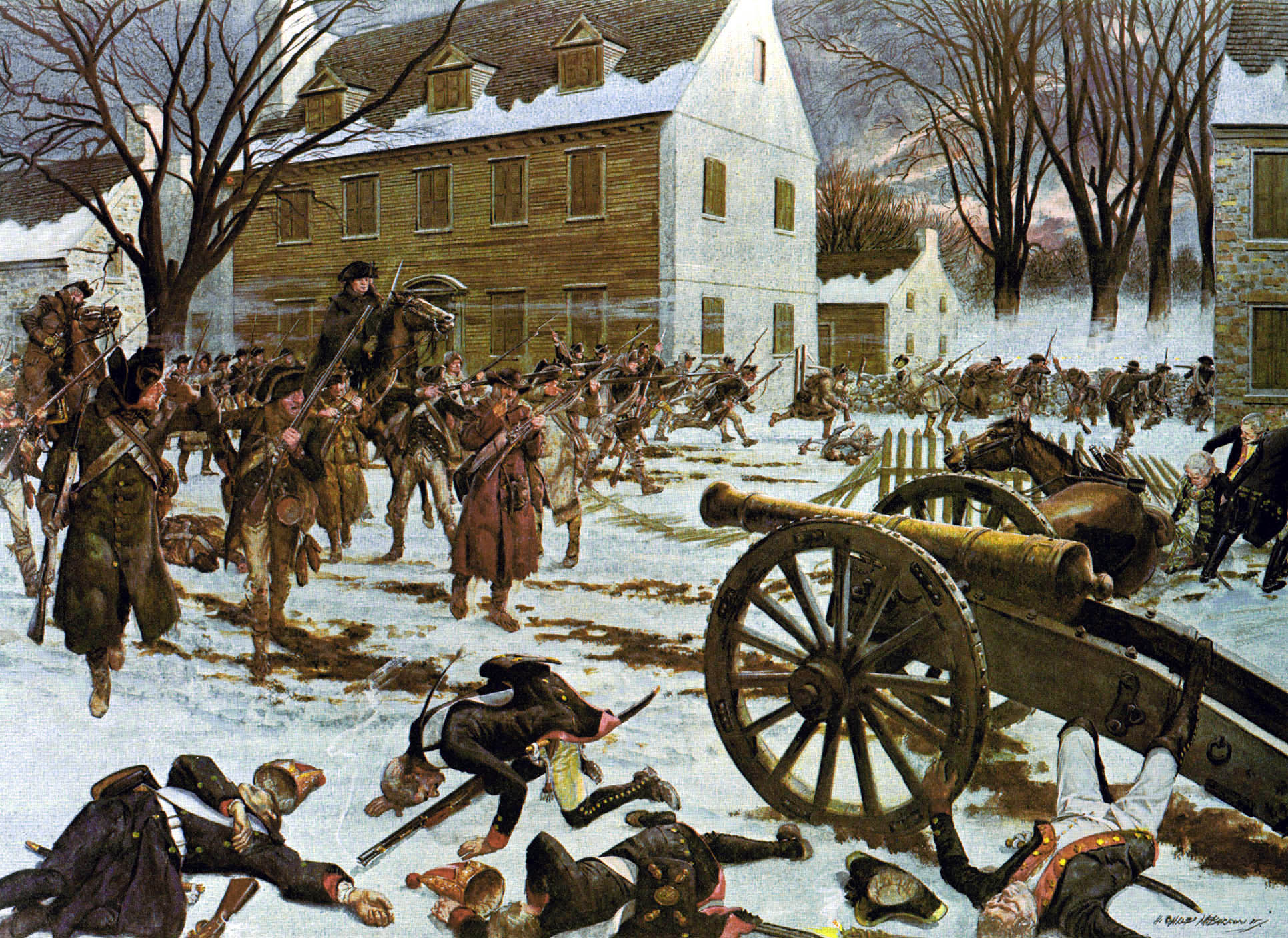
Deception played a key role in Washington's success at the Battle of Trenton in 1776

Prior to the Battle of Trenton on Christmas Day 1776, Washington used a spy, John Honeyman to gain information about the positions of the Hessian troops. Posing as a Loyalist butcher and weaver, Honeyman traded with British and Hessian troops and acquired useful intelligence. At the same time, he aided Washington's plan by spreading disinformation that convinced the British and Hessians that Continental Army morale was low and an end-of-year attack by American forces unlikely to happen. Honeyman's deceptive information enabled Washington to gain the element of surprise, and his troops routed the Hessians.

=== Battle of Cowpens ===
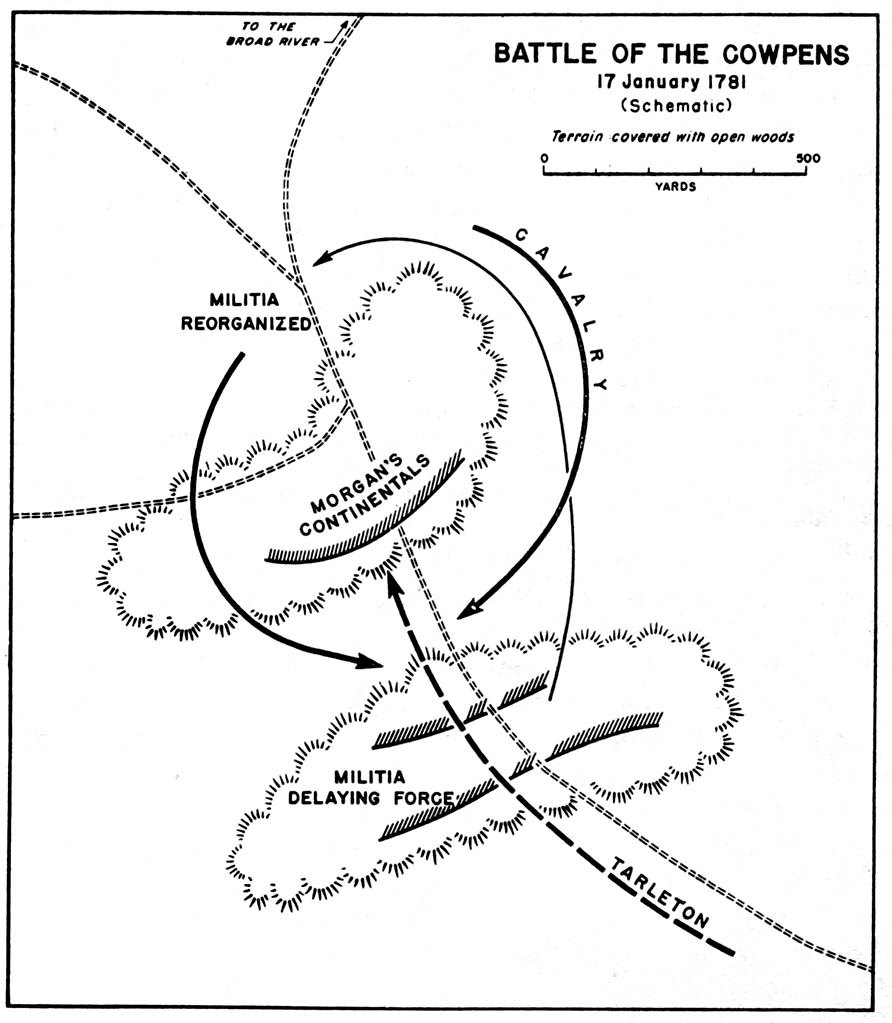
Schematic of the Battle of Cowpens, which shows Daniel Morgan's deceptive employment of the American militia under his command

In the fall of 1780, Continental Army general Nathanael Greene, commander of the Southern Department, carried out a harassment campaign against the British in North and South Carolina. One of Greene's subordinates, Daniel Morgan, commanded a force of approximately 600, and was tasked with harassing the British in the backcountry of South Carolina. In January 1781, as a British force commanded by Banastre Tarleton closed in on Morgan near Cowpens, South Carolina on the Broad River, he opted to fight rather than risk being attacked while attempting to cross the water.

Knowing the British regarded American militia as inferior, Morgan used this perception to his advantage by arranging his troops in three lines. The first were sharpshooters, who provided harassing fire and attempted to target British officers. The sharpshooters would then fall back to the second line, which would consist of militiamen. The militia would fire two volleys, then feign a rout and pretend to flee. If the British believed they had caused a panic in the militiamen, they would charge forward. But instead of catching up to the fleeing militia, they would run into the third line—Continental Army soldiers commanded by John Eager Howard. As a reserve, Morgan had a small Continental cavalry force commanded by William Washington.

Morgan's deception proved decisive. At the Battle of Cowpens on 17 January 1781, a British force under Tarleton launched a frontal assault. The militia feigned retreat, and Tarleton's troops charged forward. As planned, they were met by Howard's troops, then surprised by Washington's cavalry charging into their flanks. Tarleton's force lost over 100 killed, over 200 wounded, and over 500 captured. Morgan's command sustained only 12 killed and 60 wounded.

== French Revolutionary Wars ==
Napoleon Bonaparte made significant use of deception during his campaigns. At the 1796 Battle of Lodi, he used deception to achieve a successful crossing of the River Po. As a diversion, Napoleon mounted a token crossing attempt against a strong Austrian force under Johann Peter Beaulieu. Meanwhile, the bulk of his force moved upriver and obtained an uncontested bridgehead at Piacenza. Once it had crossed the river, Napoleon's force attacked the Austrian rear guard in a tactic he referred to as manoeuvre sur les derrières ("maneuvering behind").

== War of the First Coalition ==
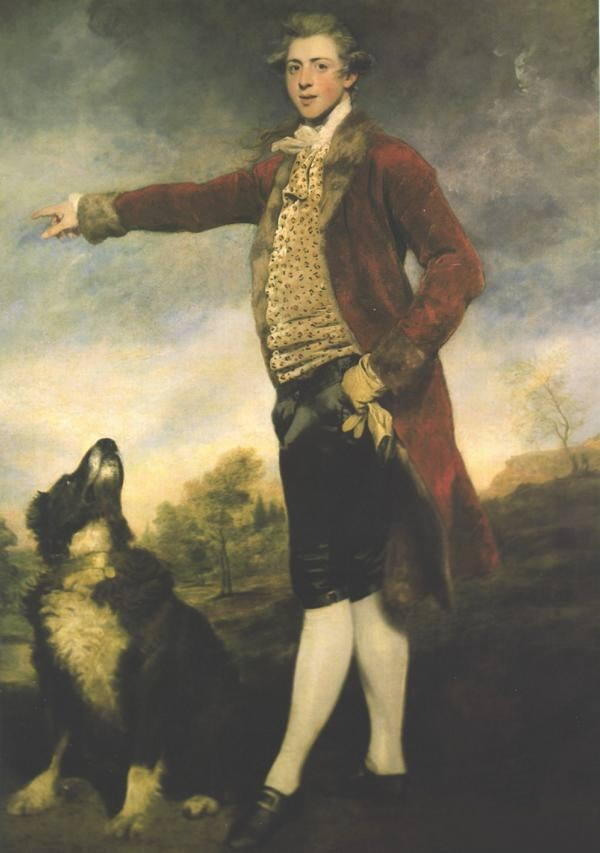
Lord Cawdor, whose successful bluff caused the French to surrender during the War of the First Coalition

During the War of the First Coalition, France attempted an invasion of Britain. During the February 1797 Battle of Fishguard, Colonel William Tate an Irish-American commanding French and Irish troops, landed near Fishguard in Wales. English and Welsh militia and civilians under the command of John Campbell, 1st Baron Cawdor hastily assembled to defend the town. When discipline began to break down among Tate's troops and their attempted invasion slowed down, Tate asked for surrender terms that would permit his command to leave. Instead of offering terms, Cawdor demanded unconditional surrender. As Tate and his subordinates considered Cawdor's demands overnight, Cawdor backed up his bluff with several deceptive measures. According to local lore, these included having women in Traditional Welsh costumes and Welsh hats line the cliffs near the French camp. from a distance, the women appeared to be British soldiers in red coats and mitre caps. Convinced that he was outnumbered, Tate surrendered and his troops were taken prisoner.

== First Barbary War ==
In October, 1803 the frigate USS Philadelphia ran aground off the North African port of Tripoli during the First Barbary War and was captured by the Tripolitan forces. In February 1804, a U.S. military detachment under the command of Stephen Decatur Jr., was assigned to retrieve the ship or destroy it to keep Tripoli from putting it into service. The raiding party deceived the Tripolitan authorities by sailing into Tripoli harbor aboard USS Intrepid, a captured Tripolitan ketch which they disguised as a Maltese merchant ship. The ship's Sicilian harbor pilot spoke to the Tripolitan authorities in Arabic, claimed the ship had lost its anchors in a storm, and sought permission to tie up next to the captured Philadelphia. Permission was granted and Decatur and his crew overwhelmed the small force guarding Philadelphia, using only swords and pikes to avoid gunshots that would alert authorities on shore of their presence. Unable to sail Philadelphia away, Decatur and his crew burned it, then safely escaped.

== War of 1812 ==
=== First American invasion of Canada ===
In July 1812, General William Hull was at Fort Detroit as the British fortified a defensive position across the Detroit River in Windsor, Ontario. Hull decided to drive the British to Fort Malden, further away from Detroit, so that he could seize the defenses in Windsor. To implement his plan, Hull resorted to deception, which began when his troops collected all the boats and canoes they could find. On 11 July 1812, Hull sent some boats down the river to Springwells, south of Detroit, in full view of the British. At the same time, the American regiment commanded by Duncan McArthur marched from Detroit to Springwells, also observed by the British.

With the British now anticipating an American crossing south of Detroit, a second American force moved north in the dark until they reached Bloody Run, a crossing point one and a half miles (2.4 km) north of Fort Detroit and opposite the Ontario town of Sandwich. Finding no activity at Springwells, the British believed the Americans had already crossed the river and marched on Fort Malden. Assuming Fort Malden was vulnerable, the British troops in Sandwich marched south, and in the morning the Americans at Bloody Run crossed to Sandwich unopposed. After landing in Sandwich, the Americans then marched from Sandwich to Windsor and occupied the British defensive works.

=== Retaking the brig Nerina ===
In July 1812, the British warship HMS Belvidera captured the American brig Nerina, which had sailed for New York City from Newry, Ireland without knowing that war had been declared in June. Nerina's crew was transferred to a British ship except for her captain, James Stewart, who remained on board with a British prize crew which intended to sail Nerina to Halifax, Nova Scotia so a prize court could adjudicate her. When Belvidera was out of sight, Stewart suggested to the prize master the propriety of opening the hatches to air out Nerina's hold. The master gave the order, and the fifty American passengers Stewart had hidden belowdecks before Nerina was boarded rushed out and retook the ship. Stewart's successful deception enabled him to resume command and sail Nerina to New London, Connecticut, which he reached on 4 August.

=== Siege of Detroit ===
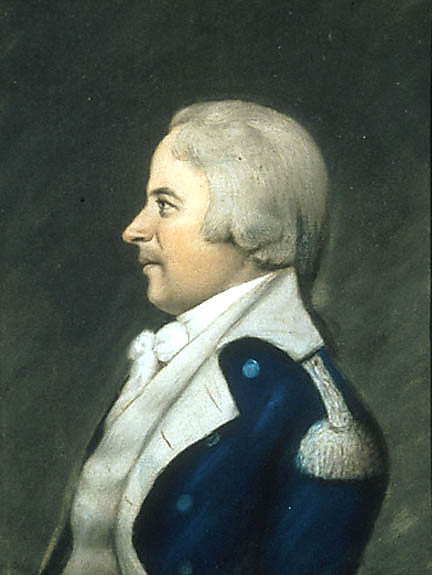
William Hull, the target of successful British deception during the War of 1812

In a notable deception that occurred during the War of 1812's Siege of Detroit, British Major-general Isaac Brock and Native American chief Tecumseh used a variety of tricks, including letters they allowed to be intercepted which exaggerated the size of their forces, disguising Brock's militia contingent as more fearsome regular army soldiers, and repeatedly marching the same body of Native Americans past U.S. observers to make it appear they were more numerous than they were. Though he had superior troop strength, the U.S. commander, Brigadier General William Hull, believed he faced overwhelming numbers of British regular troops and hordes of uncontrollable Indians. Fearing a massacre, in August 1812 Hull surrendered the town and the attached fort. Most of his militia were allowed to return home, while his regular army soldiers were held as British prisoners of war.

=== Capture of HMS Eagle ===
In 1813, the British Royal Navy continued to blockade America's major ports. The British flagship HMS Poictiers, commanded by Commodore John Beresford maintained station just outside Sandy Hook on Lower New York Bay, supported by the schooner HMS Eagle, which seized several local fishing vessels. John Percival of the United States Navy volunteered to capture Eagle, and acquired a fishing boat named Yankee. On the morning of 4 July 1813, he concealed 34 armed volunteers in the hold, while he and two volunteers stayed on deck dressed as fishermen. Percival then sailed Yankee as though it was departing on a fishing voyage. Eagle's captain spotted Yankee and sailed in close so he could order it to transfer the livestock it carried on deck to the nearby Poictiers. Percival pretended to comply, and when Eagle was less than ten feet (3.0 m) away, he signaled his volunteers to launch a surprise attack by shouting "Lawrence!" in honor of deceased U.S. Navy Captain James Lawrence. Percival's volunteers poured out on deck and began firing. Eagle's crew were taken by surprise and fled below deck. A British sailor struck Eagle's colors; two of the schooner's crew were killed and another received mortal wounds, while the Americans suffered no casualties. Percival brought the captured Eagle into port and delivered his prisoners to New York City's Whitehall Street docks as thousands of Americans were celebrating Independence Day.

==== Battle of Conjocta Creek ====
In August 1814, American Major Lodowick Morgan of the Regiment of Riflemen, who was based in Buffalo, New York, correctly deduced that the British were going to attack Buffalo from Canada by crossing the bridge at Conjocta Creek (also called Scajaquada). Morgan and 240 riflemen marched to the point where the road from Black Rock crossed the Conjocta. They sabotaged the bridge by pulling up a number of planks, then built breastworks at the south side. Afterwards, they continued on to Black Rock. Once at Black Rock, Morgan's troops marched back the way they came while playing music and making as much noise as possible to gain the attention of the British and make them believe the Americans were headed to Buffalo.

Once out of sight, Morgan and his men marched secretly through the woods to occupy the breastworks they had constructed on the south bank of the creek. The British arrived at the bridge and discovered the sabotage. While they halted to consider their options, Morgan began the Battle of Conjocta Creek by blowing a whistle to signal his soldiers, who fired a devastating volley. The British sought cover on the north bank and fired back, but the American troops remained protected behind their breastworks. The British attempted an assault on the breastworks, which the Americans repulsed. The British then attempted a flanking maneuver, which was also repulsed. Unable to proceed past the Conjocta, the British retreated back to Canada. The Americans lost two killed and eight wounded, while the British sustained twelve killed and twenty-one wounded.

== American Civil War ==
=== Peninsula campaign ===
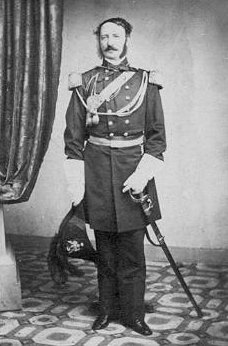
John B. Magruder, Confederate general whose deceptions prevented a Union attack early in the war

In the American Civil War's Peninsula campaign, Union commander George B. McClellan was the victim of a deception executed by the forces under Confederate commander John B. Magruder during the 1862 Siege of Yorktown. Magruder, who had acted in and produced plays, used his knowledge of visual and audio effects to deceive McClellan into believing Magruder's force was larger than it was. These included placing straw dummy crewmen alongside Quaker guns—logs painted black to resemble cannons—in his defensive works. Magruder interspersed his Quaker guns with the few real cannons he possessed, making his artillery seem more numerous than it was. In addition, he used shouted orders and bugle calls to march his relatively small force of about 10,000 in front of Union positions until they were out of sight, then had them loop around unseen and march through the same area again, making his troop strength seem greater than it was. Magruder's elaborate charade convinced McClellan, who outnumbered Magruder by ten to one, that he faced a more formidable opponent than was actually the case, which caused him to delay attacking. McClellan's delay allowed Confederate reinforcements to arrive, causing him to retreat back to Washington, D.C.

== Second Boer War ==
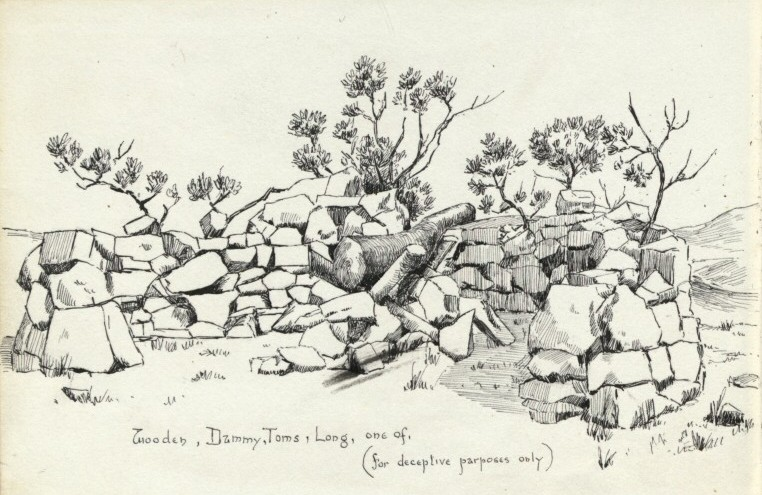
Dummy Long Tom artillery position deployed during the Second Boer War

During the Second Boer War, British commander Robert Baden-Powell made extensive use of deception during his October 1899 to May 1900 defense of Mafeking. After he occupied the town with a force of 1,500, Baden-Powell faced 8,000 Boers who intended to begin a siege. As the Boers advanced, Baden-Powell wrote a letter to a friend in Transvaal whom he knew had died, which contained news of the imminent approach of more British troops. Baden-Powell intended for the letter to be intercepted and when it fell into Boer hands, they believed it was real. As a result, they diverted 1,200 troops to guard the approaches against Baden-Powell's fictional reinforcements. Baden-Powell's troops also set up fake defensive works at a distance from the town itself, including one marked as his command post, which further diverted Boer attention. In addition, he had local residents execute deceptive tactics, including carrying boxes of sand labeled "mines" in places where they could be observed. Word of these supposed mines reached the Boers, and when they soon afterwards observed supposed minefields appear around the edge of the town, they assumed the danger was real. These deceptive measures held off a Boer attack, which allowed Baden-Powell time to improve Mafeking's defences. As a result of his effort, the British were able to hold out until reinforcements arrived and lifted the siege.

== World War I ==
=== Gallipoli campaign ===
During World War I, deception shifted from the tactical level to the strategic as modernized warfare and advances in technology increased the size and complexity of battlefield organizations. Several methods of deception were used by the Australian and New Zealand Army Corps (Anzac) during its withdrawal from Gallipoli in Turkey, which was completed on 20 December 1915. As early as mid-November, artillery and sniper activity went silent for periods of time, giving the impression that the Anzacs were preparing to remain in the defense with limited resupply of ammunition during the upcoming winter. To cover the removal of the last troops, "drip rifles" were prepared to fire about 20 minutes after they were set, with a water can leaking into a second can that was tied to a rifle trigger. When the second can was full, the weight caused the unmanned rifle to fire. The sporadic firing created by this ruse convinced the Turks that the Anzac troops were still manning their defenses. In addition, Anzac troops used dummy artillery and mannequins to further enhance the impression that soldiers remained in their positions. As a result of these deceptive measures, both the main body of Anzac troops and the rear guard retreated unmolested. Given the failure of the Gallipoli effort from the Anzac perspective, the evacuation was considered the most successful part of the entire campaign.

=== Western front ===
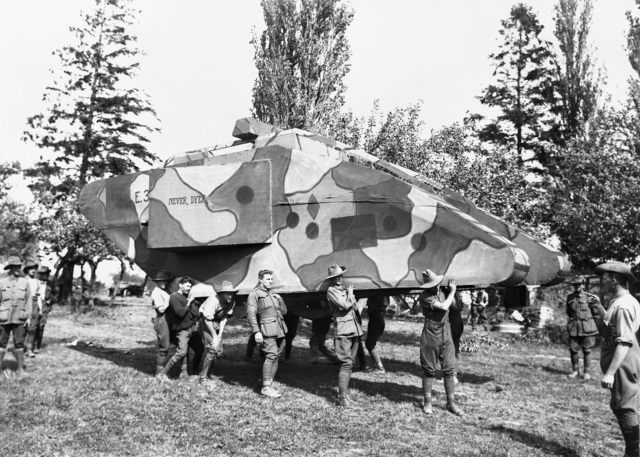
World War I Australian troops carrying a dummy Mark IV tank that was intended to deceive German forces during the following day's assault on part of the Hindenburg Line (September 1918)

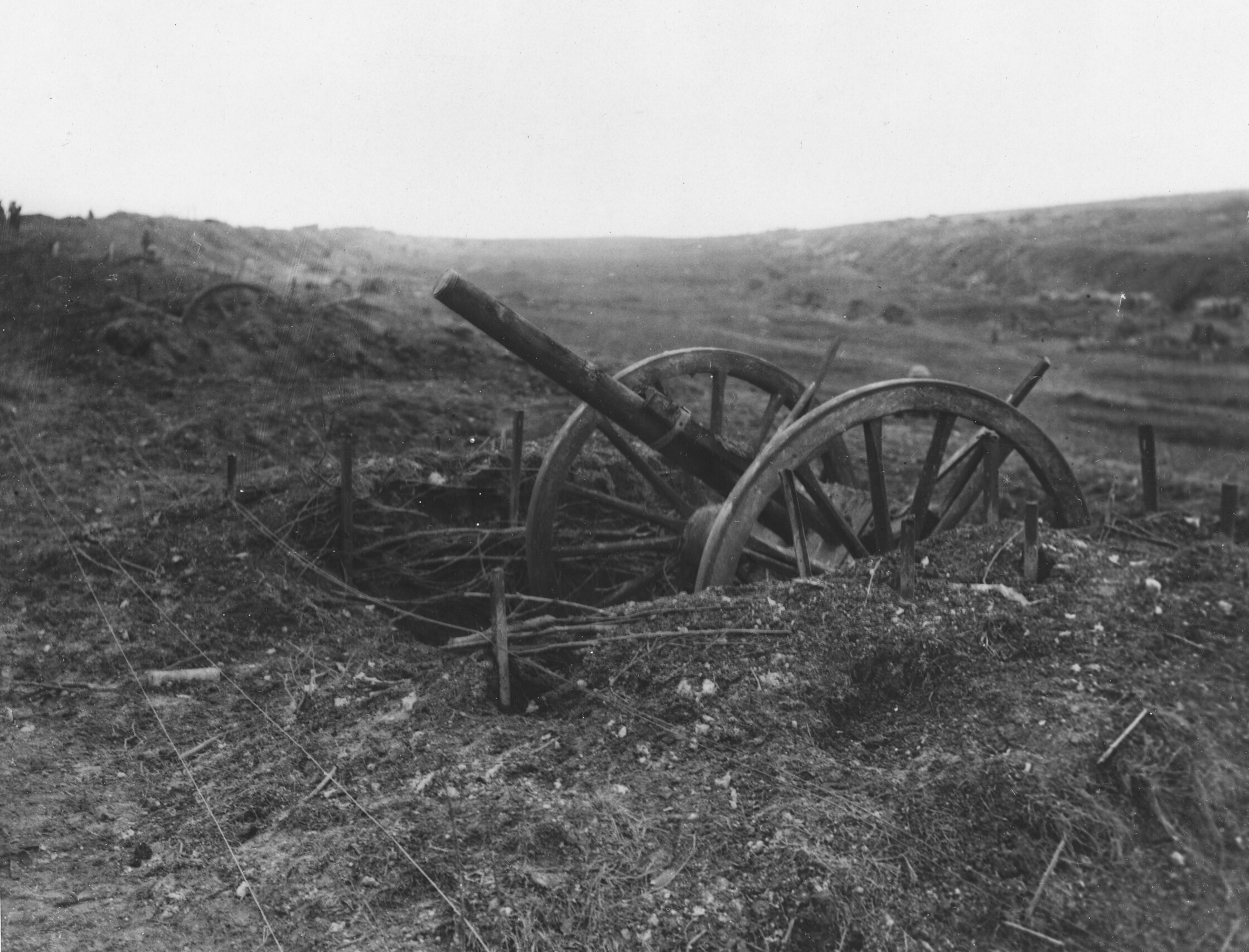
A fake German artillery piece in World War I, created to draw fire, c. 1918.

In March 1917, leaders of the German Army on the Western Front decided to withdraw from their positions in France to the Hindenburg Line, a 90-mile-long (140 km) defensive position that ran from Arras to Laffaux. With Germany unable to conduct an offensive because of personnel losses earlier in the war, commanders intended for unrestricted submarine warfare and strategic bombing to weaken the British and French, giving the German army time to recuperate. In addition, the move to the Hindenburg Line supported the plan of commanders Paul von Hindenburg and Erich Ludendorff to shift the German focus to Russia and the Eastern Front. The withdrawal to the new defensive line would shorten Germany's front by 25 miles (40 km), enabling 13 divisions to be employed against the Russians.

Under the plan code named Operation Alberich, the Germans abandoned their old positions in a staged series that began in late February. The majority of their movement occurred between 16 and 21 March, and the full German withdrawal to the Hindenburg Line was completed on 5 April. The German withdrawal included numerous efforts to deceive the Allies, among them night movements and skeleton crews who remained behind to provide screening fire from machine guns, rifles, and mortars. The deception activities proved generally successful, and Germany completed its withdrawal to the Hindenburg Line largely unmolested.

In August 1918, the Allies intended to launch two offensives, one led by British Field Marshal Sir Douglas Haig, Commander-in-chief (C-in-C) of the British Expeditionary Force (BEF), near Amiens, and the other by American General John J. Pershing, C-in-C of the American Expeditionary Forces (AEF), near Saint-Mihiel. Prior to the Battle of Amiens, Haig's subordinate, General Henry Rawlinson, commander of the British Fourth Army, employed several deceptive tactics, including periods of radio silence by units involved in the coming attack and false radio traffic from other parts of the British lines. In addition, Rawlinson delayed troop movement for as long as possible prior to the start of the attack to prevent German observers from obtaining data on his disposition of forces, and moved troops and materiel almost entirely at night. The British offensive was immediately successful because they had maintained the element of surprise. British troops and tanks advanced 8 miles (13 km), captured 400 artillery pieces, and inflicted 27,000 casualties, including 12,000 prisoners.

In an effort to gain an advantage near Saint-Mihiel, U.S. planners including Arthur L. Conger attempted to deceive the Germans into believing the American attack would come at Belfort, 180 miles (290 km) to the south. False orders left where spies or informants could find them and staff officer reconnaissance activity created the appearance that the U.S. intended to conduct operations in and around Belfort. Pershing gained surprise at Saint-Mihiel and his offensive was successful. In 1926, Conger discovered from a former German officer that while the Belfort Ruse had not been completely successful, it had aided Pershing. Concerned that an Allied attack in the Belfort area was at least a possibility, many German units that could have reinforced German lines in the Saint-Mihiel area delayed movement from their rear area positions near Saint-Mihiel until it was too late. As a result of the success of Pershing's offensive, they did not have time to execute their withdrawal plans, and either abandoned their weapons and fled or were taken as prisoners.

=== Eastern front ===
At a war council held with senior commanders and the czar in April 1916, Russian General Aleksei Brusilov presented a plan to the Stavka (the Russian high command), proposing a massive offensive by his Southwestern Front against the Austro-Hungarian forces in Galicia. Brusilov's plan aimed to take some of the pressure off French and British armies in France and the Italian Army along the Isonzo Front and if possible to knock Austria-Hungary out of the war. As the Austrian army was heavily engaged in Italy, the Russian army enjoyed a significant numerical advantage in the Galician sector.

Brusilov's plan was approved, and he massed 40 infantry divisions and 15 cavalry divisions in preparation for the Brusilov Offensive. Deception efforts included false radio traffic, false orders sent by messengers who were intended to be captured, and equipment displays including dummy artillery to mislead Austria-Hungary as to the location of his units. Beginning in June 1916, Brusilov's surprise offensive caused Germany to halt its Western front attack on Verdun and transfer considerable forces to the Eastern front. It also severely reduced the fighting effectiveness of Austria-Hungary's forces, effectively depriving Germany of its most important ally.

=== Palestine ===
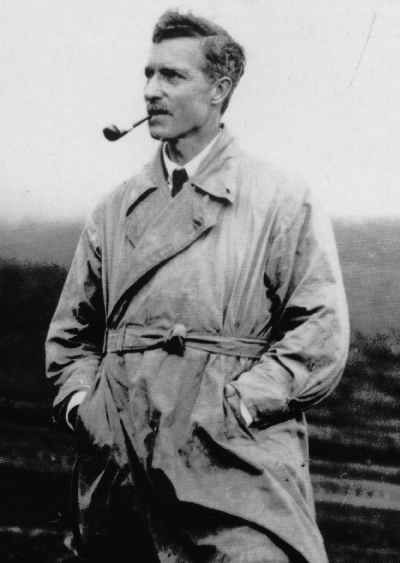
Richard Meinertzhagen, credited with several British deceptions in Palestine during World War I.

In October 1917, Edmund Allenby, commander of Britain's Egyptian Expeditionary Force, planned to attack the Ottomans in southern Palestine. Rather than repeat previous frontal assaults at Gaza, which had been unsuccessful, he planned a flanking attack at Beersheba. As part of the larger deception effort to convince the Ottomans that Gaza was his objective, an officer under Allenby's command executed a deceptive tactic now known as the Haversack Ruse. In this effort, usually attributed to Richard Meinertzhagen, the officer intentionally dropped a knapsack which contained false plans for an attack on Gaza, which the Ottomans recovered. As a result of the Haversack Ruse and other deceptive measures, the British surprised the Ottomans and achieved victory at the 31 October 1917 Battle of Beersheba.

=== At sea ===
Britain's Royal Navy made extensive use of Q-ships to combat German submarines. Camouflaged to look like a civilian sailing vessel or decrepit tramp steamer, the Q-ships were decoys that carried concealed heavy guns. The function of the Q-ships was to appear to be an undefended target. If successful, German submarines would be lured to the surface to sink or destroy the ship by using deck guns, enabling the submarine to conserve its limited supply of torpedoes for use against warships. If a German U-boat surfaced, the Q-ship would immediately display the Royal Navy's White Ensign flag in compliance with international law, then deploy its guns against the submarine. In 150 engagements, British Q-ships destroyed 14 U-boats and damaged 60. 27 of the 200 Q-ships the British employed were lost to German attacks.

== World War II ==
=== Eastern Front ===
Before Operation Barbarossa in June 1941, the German High Command explained away the creation of a massive force arrayed to invade the Soviet Union by informing Soviet leaders including Joseph Stalin that it was training in preparation for an invasion of the United Kingdom. The deception worked, and Stalin continued to ignore German preparations until after the invasion of the Soviet Union had actually commenced.

When the Allies on the Western Front planned the Normandy invasion for June 1944, the Soviet Union simultaneously planned for a major Eastern front offensive against German forces. Called Operation Bagration, this Soviet attack was designed to catch the Germans unprepared in Belorussia, at the center of their lines. To gain and maintain the element of surprise for Bagration, the Soviets executed a successful deception effort. The overall intent was to make German commanders believe the Soviets would only defend in the center of the front (Belorussia), while launching a major offensive to the south in Ukraine and Crimea and a feint to the north in Finland. Soviet military leaders successfully masked preparations for action in Belorussia and limited German reconnaissance in the center of the front while drawing German attention to deceptive activities in the north and south. Germany was caught off-guard at the start of the Bagration offensive on 23 June, and the Soviets quickly pushed retreating German forces from the Soviet Union all the way to Poland.

=== Western Front ===
==== Africa ====
From early 1941, Dudley Clarke commanded the 'A' Force, based in Cairo, Egypt, which developed much of the war's Allied deception strategy. In an initial deception failure from which Clarke derived an important lesson he put to use in the future, the British intended to retake British Somaliland by an advance from Sudan into Eritrea. Operation Camilla was intended to deceive the Italians occupying British Somaliland into thinking the British intended to retake British Somaliland by an amphibious assault from Aden. Instead of moving their troops to meet the potential amphibious landing, or retreating to Italian-occupied Somalia, the Italians withdrew into Eritrea. As a result, they possessed greater strength at the British objective when the genuine British attack occurred. Clarke's lesson was to focus deception not on what the enemy should think is happening but what the deception planner wants the enemy to do as a result.

==== North Africa ====
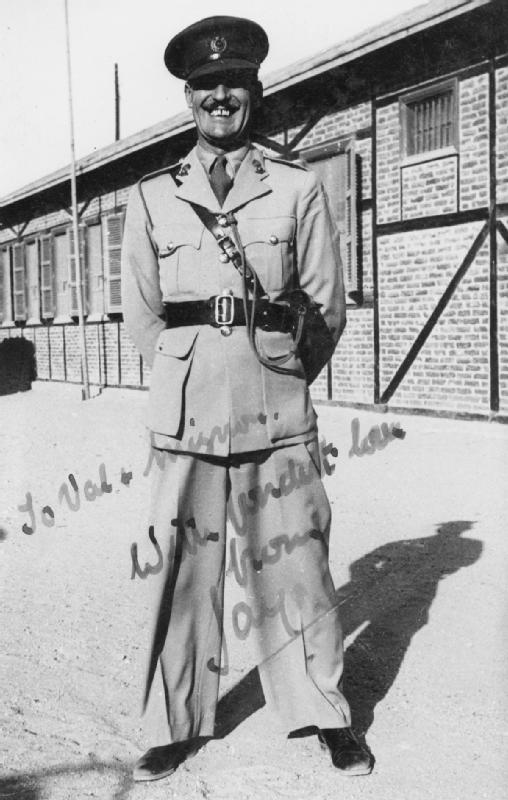
British magician Jasper Maskelyne, credited with numerous deception activities during World War II

Deception played an important part in the war in North Africa. In 1941, a British Army unit led by magician and illusionist Jasper Maskelyne prevented the destruction of Alexandria, Egypt by using lights to recreate the nighttime image of the city, while blacking out the actual city lights. Coupled with explosives that simulated German bombs landing on the city, Maskelyne's illusion caused German planes to release their ordnance on the empty coastal site he had prepared rather than on the city.

Maskelyne was subsequently tasked with preventing the Germans from attacking the Suez Canal, a key asset in the Allied supply chain. He responded by creating a system of swirling searchlights which cast a spray of strobe light over more than 100 miles (160 km) of the sky above Egypt. German pilots were unable to see the canal, and so were unable to destroy it.

As part of the deception surrounding Operation Crusader during the Siege of Tobruk, camouflage artist Steven Sykes built a dummy railhead near Misheifa in Egypt. The intent, which succeeded, was to divert German aerial attacks from the real railhead and deceive the Germans into believing that the British attack would not begin until the dummy was completed. Before the Second Battle of El Alamein, camouflage unit commander Geoffrey Barkas led Operation Sentinel and Operation Bertram, which used dummy equipment and other deceptive measures to deceive German commander Erwin Rommel about Allied strength and the timing and location of the Allied attack.

In Operation Sly Bob, Maskalyne's unit attempted to create a dummy submarine that would draw the attention of German reconnaissance aircraft along the German and Italian Italy-to-Tripoli supply line, enabling British ships to gain the element of surprise when attacking Axis shipping. By using old railroad sleeper cars, a wooden frame, nailed and welded beams, and metal tubing, Maskalyne's unit succeeded in creating a prototype that British ship commanders unaware of the deception plan nearly sank when they observed it near the Suez Canal. The difficulty in creating a viable dummy rendered the project impractical, and Sly Bob was abandoned before it was fully implemented.

Based on the experience with Sly Bob, the British attempted to portray an aging cruiser as a battleship that would pose a threat to German shipping. When the effort proved unsuccessful because the dummy equipment and fixtures added to the cruiser were unrealistic, Maskalyne's team used the partially dummied cruiser as "sucker bait". With sucker bait, a magician uses an audience's powers of observation against it by allowing members to falsely believe they see through a trick. (Note: A typical "sucker bait" trick is the disappearing rabbit. A magician makes a rabbit disappear from a box on a table, then disassembles the box to prove the rabbit is not in it. A white tuft of fur is visible on the tabletop, and the magician ostentatiously attempts to conceal it, which further draws in the audience. When the magician folds up the table and no rabbit is visible, the audience realizes their belief they had seen how the trick was performed (a trick table) was also a trick.) By appearing to attempt to camouflage the cruiser-turned-dummy battleship, which Maskalyne christened HMS Houdin after magician Jean-Eugène Robert-Houdin, but allowing German observers to see through the camouflage, Maskalyne's team enabled the Germans to conclude on their own that the British were attempting to hide a battleship. Allowing the Germans to believe they had penetrated the camouflage and detected the battleship created in the minds of German military leadership the same risk to German shipping a real battleship would have posed.

==== Normandy ====
Before the June 1944 D-Day invasion of Normandy, the Allies launched a deception codenamed Operation Bodyguard. As part of Bodyguard, the Operation Quicksilver deception portrayed First United States Army Group (FUSAG), a skeleton headquarters commanded by Omar Bradley, as an army group commanded by George Patton. In Operation Fortitude South, another component of Bodyguard, the Germans were persuaded that FUSAG would invade France at Pas-de-Calais in the fall of 1944. British and American troops used dummy equipment, false radio traffic and double agents (see Double-Cross System) to deceive German intelligence on the location and timing of the invasion. The Germans awaited the Calais landing for many weeks after the real landings in Normandy, leaving in place near Calais several divisions that could have helped delay or defeat the Normandy attack. By the time the Germans realized the Normandy landings were the actual offensive, Allied units were so well established in Normandy that they could not be dislodged.

=== Pacific theater ===
Japan continued diplomatic engagement with the U.S. on several issues of concern throughout late November and into early December 1941 even though attacking ships had sailed from their base in the remote Kuril Islands. The surprise 7 December 1941 attack on Pearl Harbor took place several hours before Japan presented a formal declaration of hostilities and officially broke diplomatic ties. Japan also made extensive use of decoys and other deceptive displays throughout the war, which took on increased importance as the tide of the war went against it in 1944 and 1945.

Prior to the October 1944 Battle off Samar, the Japanese incorporated deception into their plan of attack by luring Admiral William Halsey Jr. into leading his powerful Third Fleet to chase a decoy fleet, a target so inviting Halsey took with him every ship he commanded.

With Halsey's force out of the way, the Japanese intended to attack the Allied landings on Leyte. The U.S. responded with their few remaining forces, the three escort carrier groups of the Seventh Fleet. Escort carriers and destroyer escorts had been built to protect slow convoys from submarine attack, and were later adapted to attack ground targets, but they had few torpedoes, as they normally relied on Halsey's fleet to protect them from armored warships. These ships, organized as Task Unit 77.4.3 ("Taffy 3"), and commanded by Rear Admiral Clifton Sprague, possessed neither the firepower nor the armor to oppose the 23 ships of the Japanese force, which included Yamato's 18-inch guns, but took the initiative and attacked. In addition to ships firing on the Japanese from point-blank range, aircraft including FM-2 Wildcats, F6F Hellcats and TBM Avengers, strafed, bombed, torpedoed, rocketed, and depth-charged the Japanese force until they ran out of ammunition. They then resorted to deception, including numerous "dry runs" at the Japanese ships. Concerned that he faced a larger force than he actually did, Japanese commander Admiral Takeo Kurita decided to withdraw.

During the Battle of Iwo Jima in February and March 1945, Japanese deception included dummy tanks sculpted out of the island's soft volcanic rock. At the Japanese-held airfield in Tianhe District, China, the Japanese painted on the ground the image of a B-29 Bomber that appeared to be on fire. Their intent was for the painted image to appear real to high-flying aircraft, which would lower their altitude to investigate, thus making them targets for Japanese anti-aircraft fire. In addition, the Japanese made extensive use of bamboo-framed dummy aircraft to project airpower and protect their remaining aircraft, straw dummy soldiers and wood weapons that made defensive works appear to be manned, and wood dummy tanks to make infantry soldiers appear to have more combat power than they actually possessed.

=== At sea ===
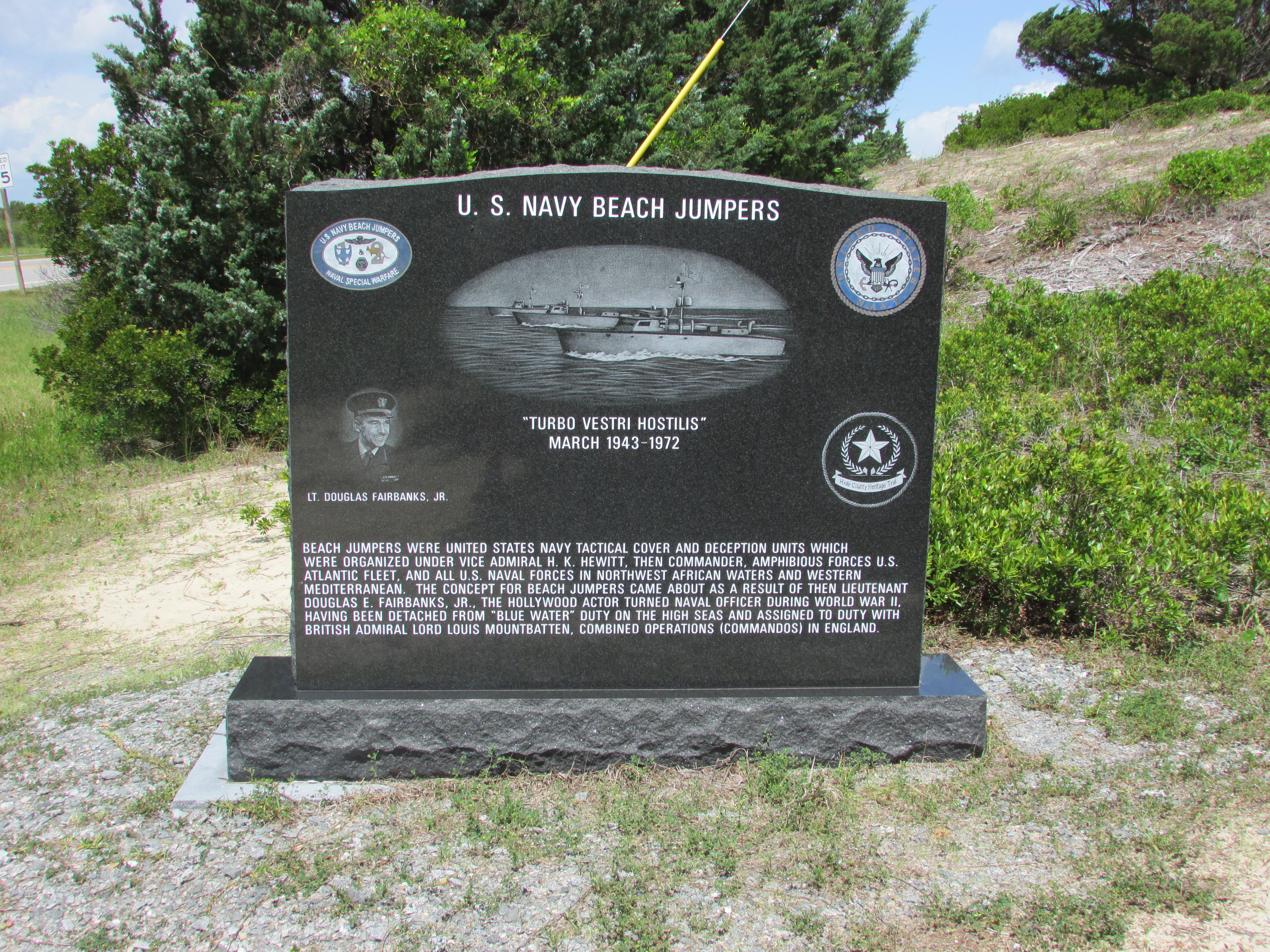
Beach Jumpers monument at Ocracoke Island, North Carolina

As a liaison to the British Navy early in the war, actor and U.S. Navy officer Douglas Fairbanks Jr. observed and participated in several raiding parties and diversions on the French coast. Upon returning to the United States, Fairbanks proposed to Ernest King, the Chief of Naval Operations the creation of a unit that would plan and execute diversionary and deception missions. King authorized Fairbanks to recruit 180 officers and 300 enlisted men for the program, which was named Beach Jumpers. There are several stories about how the unit was named; during an interview late in life, Fairbanks said British admiral Louis Mountbatten coined it with the intention of creating a designation that provided cover for the unit's activities by being partly descriptive and partly in code.

On 16 March 1943 Beach Jumper Unit ONE (BJU-1) was commissioned with the mission "To assist and support the operating forces in the conduct of Tactical Cover and Deception in Naval Warfare." Eleven BJUs deployed during the war, and were used in all theaters. The Beach Jumpers raided false landing zones and shore defenses during amphibious attacks, sowing confusion with the enemy about actual landing sites and causing the enemy to defend in the wrong place. To carry out these deceptions, their boats were equipped with two .50 caliber machine guns, 10 window (chaff) rockets, smoke generators, and floating time-delay explosive packs. They were also outfitted with naval balloons and communications and psychological operations equipment, including recorders, speakers, generators, and radio jammers. The balloons included radar reflective strips that when towed would cause Beach Jumper units to appear to enemy radar operators as a larger force than they actually were.

Beach Jumper units created diversionary landings during several battles, including Operation Husky and Operation Dragoon. The Beach Jumpers were inactivated after World War II, but were reconstituted for service during the Korean War and Vietnam War. With the U.S. military creating and fielding an Information Operations capability beginning in the early 1990s, the modern Beach Jumpers exist as part of U.S. Naval Information Forces.

== Korean War ==
In the summer of 1950, the Korean People's Army (KPA) of North Korea attacked South Korea. 140,000 South Korean and allied soldiers were nearly defeated. In August and September 1950, South Korea and its allies waged the Battle of Pusan Perimeter against the KPA and succeeded in establishing a defensive line that prevented the KPA from destroying them.

To enable the counterattack that started with an amphibious landing at Inchon (codenamed Operation Chromite), United Nations (U.N.) forces staged an elaborate deception that made it appear the landing would take place at Gunsan, 105 miles (169 km) away from the actual landing site at Inchon and closer to the Pusan Perimeter. On 5 September, the U.S. Air Force began attacks on roads and bridges to isolate Gunsan. This was followed by a naval bombardment, which was followed by heavy bombing of military installations in and near the town. These tactics were typical pre-invasion steps, and were intended to cause North Korea to believe Gunsan was the planned U.N. invasion site.

In addition to the aerial and naval bombardment, United States Marine Corps officers briefed their units on the supposed Gunsan landing within earshot of many Koreans, assuming that the information would make its way to KPA leaders through rumors or spies. On the night of 12–13 September, the British Royal Navy landed U.S. Army special operations troops and Royal Marines commandos at Gunsan, making sure that enemy forces noticed their supposed reconnaissance of the area. U.N. forces also conducted rehearsals on the coast of South Korea at several sites with conditions were similar to Inchon. These drills enabled U.N. forces to perfect the timing and actions of the planned Inchon landing while simultaneously confusing the North Koreans as to the actual landing site.

On 15 September, United Nations forces under Douglas MacArthur surprised the KPA with the Inchon landing. In the ensuing Battle of Inchon, the U.N. ended a string of victories by North Korea. The KPA collapsed within a month, and 135,000 KPA troops were taken prisoner.

== Vietnam War ==
Both North Vietnam and the forces of South Vietnam and the United States made use of deception during the Vietnam War.

=== Operation Bolo ===
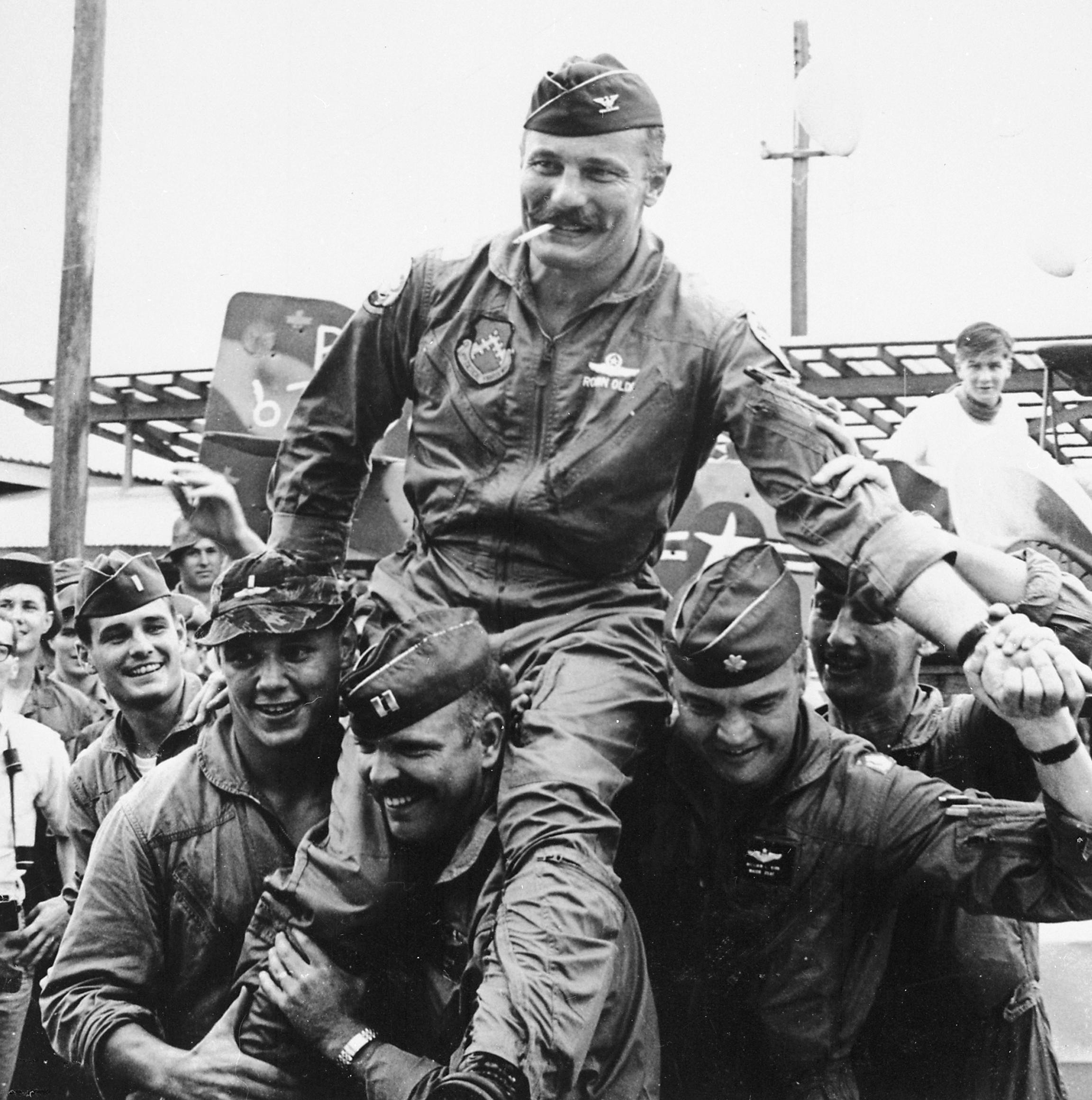
Robin Olds, who led the Operation Bolo deception, is celebrated after completing his 100th aerial combat mission in September 1967

In 1967's Operation Bolo, a United States Air Force unit led by Robin Olds successfully countered the threat posed by Soviet MiG-21 fighter planes operating in North Vietnam.

During bombing missions, unescorted U.S. Republic F-105 Thunderchief fighter-bombers would often be attacked by MiG-21s. Heavily laden with ordnance, the F-105s were no match for the faster MiGs. On occasions when the F-105s were escorted by F-4 Phantom II fighter planes, the MiGs would refuse to engage. In addition, the rules of engagement on the U.S. side prevented attacking the MiGs when they were on the ground. This measure was intended to keep the Soviet Union from becoming further engaged in the conflict by preventing casualties to the Soviet mechanics and technical advisors who were assisting North Vietnam.

To counter the MiG threat, Olds' 8th Fighter Wing prepared its F-4s to display the electronic and radar signatures of F-105s. To create this effect, the 8th Fighter Wing outfitted F-4s with QRC-160 jamming pods, a device used only by F-105s. When they flew the mission, Olds and his fellow pilots assumed the route, elevation, speed, and formation of an F-105 flight. They also staggered the takeoff and arrival times of the F-4s, enabling later-arriving F-4s to prevent the MiGs from landing.

The Bolo deception was executed successfully. The North Vietnamese believed they faced an F-105 flight and dispatched their MiGs. The later-arriving F4s prevented the MiGs from returning to their base. The 8th Fighter Wing destroyed seven MiGs in a matter of minutes, while Olds' fighters sustained no losses. The destruction of half their MiGs and uncertainty about whether future flights observed on radar and electronic sensors were unescorted F-105s or F-4s pretending to be F-105s caused North Vietnam to ground its MiGs. The MiGs failed in their mission of preventing U.S. Operation Rolling Thunder bombing runs over North Vietnam.

=== Tet Offensive ===
In 1967, the government and military of North Vietnam began planning for an offensive that would begin in early 1968. The intent within the war's area of operations was to spark an uprising by the Viet Cong and others in South Vietnam who were sympathetic to the government in the north. In a wider sense, North Vietnam hoped the offensive would cause a withdrawal of U.S. troops from South Vietnam by undermining U.S. public confidence in the war.

North Vietnam implemented several deceptive measures to mask preparations for the offensive. In October, the North Vietnamese government announced that it would observe a seven-day holiday truce from 27 January to 3 February 1968, several days longer than previous Tet truces had lasted. The U.S. and South Vietnam presumed that the coming offensive, of which they had received some intelligence, would take place before or after the truce. When the attacks had not commenced before the holiday, South Vietnamese and U.S. leaders assumed it would come after the holiday. As a result, they allowed many soldiers to take holiday leave and relaxed the usual security measures.

As an additional deceptive measure, while intending to attack South Vietnam's major cities and military installations, the North Vietnamese continued attacks along the border between the two countries during late 1967. These diversionary assaults served to draw U.S. attention to the border and U.S. forces away from the actual objectives—the heavily populated South Vietnamese coastal lowlands and cities.

When the offensive commenced, South Vietnam and the U.S. were surprised by the coordinated attacks. However, the U.S. and South Vietnam regrouped and over several days repulsed the North Vietnamese assaults. North Vietnam failed to attain the immediate objective of creating an uprising in South Vietnam. In the longer term, the offensive aided in swaying U.S. public opinion against the war, which led to a decreased U.S. presence in Vietnam and eventual withdrawal.

== Yom Kippur War ==
In the period before the 1973 Yom Kippur War between Israel and the joint forces of Egypt and Syria, Egypt executed annual maneuvers near the Sinai Peninsula, Tahrir 41, which conditioned Israel to Egyptian troop activity in the area. In addition, several months before the start of the war, Egypt created the false impression of an imminent attack, which caused Israel to announce an emergency military reserve call up. When the war started, Israel believed the initial Egyptian troop movements were another iteration of the exercises the Egyptians had previously undertaken. In addition, because an emergency call up was costly and disruptive, the Israeli government was reluctant to conduct another one until it was sure an attack was underway. As a result of the deception, Egypt had surprise on its side when it attacked.

== Operation Entebbe rescue mission ==
After the hijacking of an Air France plane in late June 1976, the perpetrators had the aircraft diverted to Entebbe Airport in Uganda, where they threatened to kill all the Jewish and Israeli passengers if their demands were not met. The Israeli government pursued diplomatic efforts to free the hostages while the Israel Defense Forces planned a rescue mission in secrecy. When the raid was launched, IDF commandos secretly landed at an old unused area of the airport, where they offloaded decoy vehicles resembling Ugandan president Idi Amin's motorcade. By making themselves appear to be Amin and his security detail, the Israelis intended to gain the element of surprise on Ugandan guards at the terminal where the hostages were held. The ruse was only partly successful because Amin had recently changed limousines, and his new one was white, while the one the Israelis were using was black. The Ugandan guards realized the trick, which led to a gunfight that cost the Israeli commandos the element of surprise, but the raid ended with the successful rescue of the hostages.

== Falklands War ==
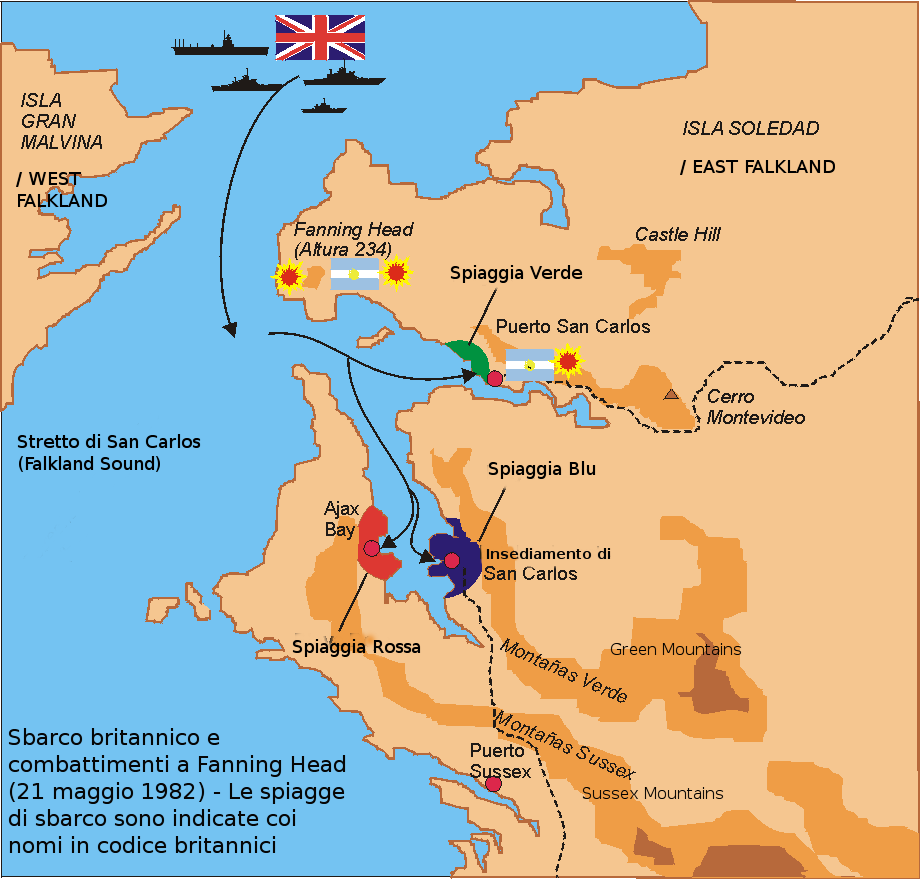
Map depicting the deceptive British landing at San Carlos during the Falklands War. The Argentinians occupying East Falkland island planned for a British attack at Port Stanley on the other side of the island.

The Falklands War took place between April and June 1982. During the period prior to the war, Argentina's military leaders, who were subordinate to general and president Leopoldo Galtieri, used the December 1981 change of command ceremony for Argentina's new chief of naval operations as cover to begin secretly planning for an invasion of the Falkland Islands. In April 1982, the forces of Argentina carried out the Invasion of South Georgia, an island possession of the United Kingdom. In mid-March, Argentina had used deception to successfully position an advance guard on South Georgia. An Argentinian company received a contract to dismantle a British whaling station for scrap. When the contractor's ship arrived, it contained members of an Argentinian Navy special forces unit who were disguised as scientists.

When the British prepared to conduct a Falklands landing in response to Argentina's invasion, Argentina anticipated an assault at Port Stanley, the capital and site of the largest airport on the islands. The British gained the element of surprise by launching a feint at Stanley while conducting their main assault at San Carlos, on the opposite side of East Falkland. The British then marched overland to Port Stanley, where they launched a land-based attack on the Argentine defenses surrounding the city. The Argentinians were caught off-guard and were soon compelled to surrender.

== Operation Just Cause ==
When the leader of Panama, Manuel Noriega realized he was being surveilled by the U.S. military prior to the United States invasion of Panama in December 1989, Noriega resorted to several deceptive measures to mask his movements and locations. These included look-alike doubles, decoy vehicles and aircraft, false convoys, frequent changes of clothes, recordings of his voice played at locations where he was not present, and frequent changes of his actual location.

On the U.S. side, deception included troop movements in and around U.S. bases in Panama made to look like routine training missions, a logistics buildup disguised as routine activity, and large-scale exercises in the United States that desensitized Panamanian leaders as to U.S. capabilities and intent. While Noriega and his subordinates knew the United States had the capacity to act, they were misled by their perceptions of U.S. activity and misreading of U.S. intent into believing that the U.S. would not attack. As a result, when the attack occurred, the U.S. had the element of surprise, which helped it gain a quick victory.

== Operation Desert Storm ==
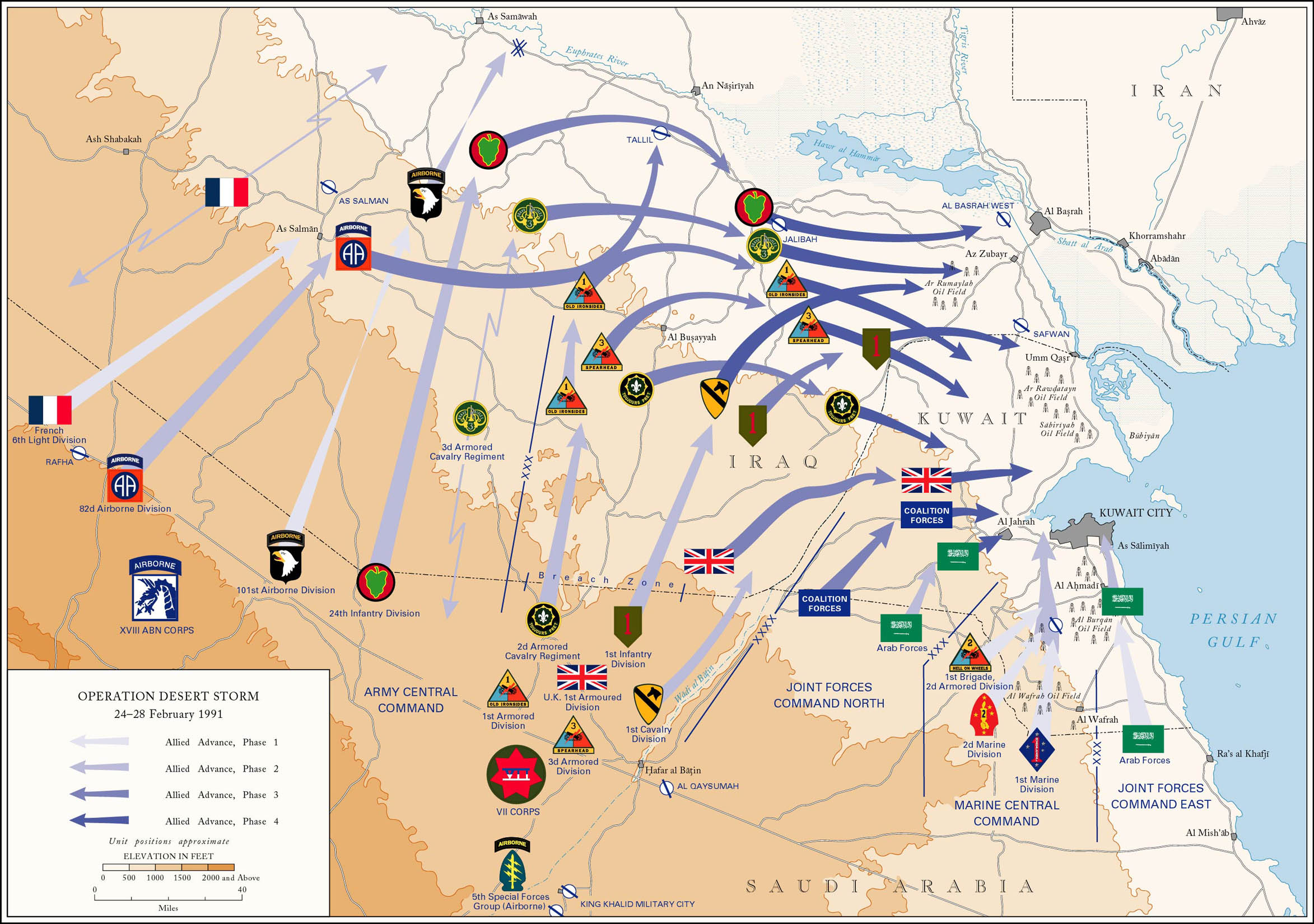
Map depicting placement of Coalition units prior to attacking Iraqi forces in early 1991. The Coalition employed deception to move the XVIII Airborne Corps and VII Armored Corps from positions in eastern Saudi Arabia to positions further west without being detected by Iraq.

During the period prior to the 1990–1991 Gulf War, Iraqi president Saddam Hussein positioned 100,000 troops near Iraq's border with Kuwait. To mask his true intention of invading Kuwait, during the summer of 1990, Saddam told ambassadors to Iraq, the leaders of other countries, and members of the international news media that his troops were on a training mission or were near the border merely as a tactic to extract concessions from Kuwait during diplomatic negotiations. On 2 August, Iraq's invasion commenced; the small Kuwaiti military was quickly overwhelmed, and Iraq occupied Kuwait.

After invading Kuwait, the creation of an anti-Iraq coalition and its movement of troops and materiel into Saudi Arabia caused Saddam to anticipate a Coalition ground assault from Saudi Arabia north into Kuwait and an amphibious landing on Kuwait's Persian Gulf coast. Prior to the start of the Coalition offensive in February 1991, its ground forces successfully moved multiple divisions west to the largely undefended border between Saudi Arabia and Iraq. When the attack commenced, the Coalition conducted a feint directly into Kuwait while the main effort—the "Left Hook" enabled by concealing the move of units to the west—attacked into Iraq and cut off Iraqi forces in Kuwait. After advancing into Iraq, Coalition forces turned right and attacked Iraqi forces in Kuwait from the rear. Facing overwhelming Coalition combat power in Kuwait and unable to retreat to Iraq, the Iraqi military in Kuwait quickly surrendered.

== Kosovo War ==
During the NATO bombing of Yugoslavia as part of the 1998–1999 Kosovo War, the Serbian Army made extensive use of deception, which caused NATO forces to expend time, effort, and resources attacking false targets. According to post-war assessments, NATO often attacked crude decoy tanks, artillery, and wheeled vehicles made of easy to obtain material including sticks and plastic. Many of these decoys included easily produced heat sources, such as burning cans of oil, which deceived the thermal imaging systems of NATO aircraft. As a result, NATO believed it inflicted far more damage on the Serbian Army than it actually had, and Serbia gained a propaganda victory by showing how easily NATO had been deceived.

== 2006 Lebanon War ==
Prior to the 2006 Lebanon War, the Hezbollah militant group employed deceptive measures intended to degrade Israel's military reputation both internationally and within Israel. Deceptive measures included the construction of false bunkers and command posts which Hezbollah allowed Israel to observe while the work was in progress, while simultaneously concealing the construction of actual facilities. When Israel attacked Hezbollah in southern Lebanon in July, the dummy sites were destroyed while the actual ones were left intact.

== Russo-Ukrainian War ==
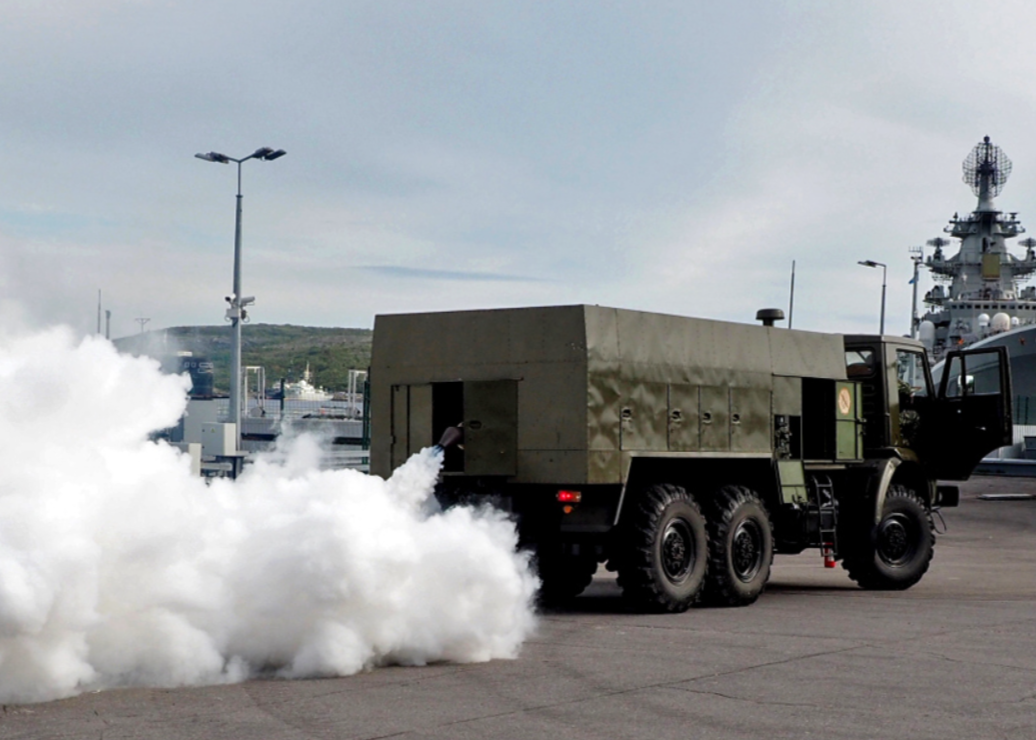
Soldiers setting up smoke screen to camouflage ships of Russia's Northern Fleet

In 2014, Russia and Ukraine went to war after Russia contested control of Ukraine's Crimea and Donbas. Russia employed disinformation and denial to facilitate its military activities, in addition to engaging in several deceptive activities. As an example, in August, Russian television news carried stories about a Russian truck convoy transporting water and baby food to Crimea. The international news media reported heavily on this convoy, presuming it was carrying Russian military supplies or materiel, and that they would be able to prove Russia was lying about the cargo. While attention was focused on this diversion, Russia's military was moving soldiers, combat equipment, and vehicles into Donbas.

== Sino-Indian border dispute ==
During the 2020–2021 China–India skirmishes, China employed military deception to gain an advantage. Intending to increase its troop presence in disputed areas of Ladakh, China's military conducted training maneuvers near the areas that were the source of tension with India. This activity conditioned India to the presence of Chinese troops in the vicinity. In addition, China began construction of a nearby airbase. In early May, China began marching troops into several of the contested locations. In mid-to-late May, the Chinese military diverted trucks from the airbase construction project and used them to rapidly transport soldiers into portions of the disputed territory. The rapid troop movements came without warning and took India by surprise. As a result, China gained numerical superiority in several of Ladakh's contested areas.

== Gaza war ==
In October 2023, Hamas employed deception to gain the element of surprise when it attacked Israel at the start of the Gaza war. These deceptive measures included a sustained effort to convince Israeli leadership that Hamas was focused on economic improvement in Gaza, not armed conflict. Hamas also trained and rehearsed its attacks in plain sight, allowing the Israelis to assume that these activities were merely posturing on the part of Hamas fighters. In addition, Hamas ramped down conflict in the Gaza Strip while increasing tensions in the West Bank; Israel moved forces from one location to the other, giving Hamas a more favorable force ratio in Gaza. Additional deceptive activities included acquiring and pre-positioning non-military vehicles intended for military use, among them bulldozers, paragliders, motorcycles, and small boats. When the attack commenced, Hamas had the advantage of catching Israel off guard, which enabled Hamas's initial success.

Israel employed a version of military deception when it resumed attacks against Hamas in March 2025. During a ceasefire, Israeli mediators were holding peace talks with Hamas early in the on Tuesday, 18 March when the surprise Israeli strikes began. At about 2 a.m., Israel launched strikes from naval ships and warplanes after weeks of preparation. According to Israeli leaders, resuming hostilities was necessary because Hamas was attempting to reassert control of Gaza during the ceasefire. Planning for this offensive was limited to a small number of Israeli staff officers and senior leaders. As a result, when the strikes commenced, Hamas leaders were caught off guard, and the Israeli people were also surprised when fighting restarted.
