= Akwamufie Palace =

Palace in Eastern Region, Ghana

Coordinates: 6.2786°N 0.0777°E

Akwamufie Palace is the seat of the Akwamuhene of the Akwamu people, as well as his official residence. It is currently occupied by the current king of Akwamu state, Odeneho Kwafo Akoto III. Odeneho Kwafo Akoto III has been steering the affairs of the kingdom of Akwamu from the Bogyawe Palace since he ascended the throne in the year 2011. It is located at Akwamufie along the bank of the Volta river in the Eastern Region in Ghana. The palace has a museum and is also a traditional monument for tourist attraction. It is also known as the Bogyawe Palace.

== History ==
The palace has artifacts which includes the key to the Christianborg castle which the Akwamus took in 1693. According to historians, the king of the Akwamus at that time called Nana Asamani sold back the castle to the Danes for 12kg of gold and still kept the keys. The palace also has the bullet proof lion skin war cloth of the Akwamuhene which is called "Mahony".
