= Akwamuhene =

Ghanaian titleship

Akwamu expansion in Ghana started between 1629 and 1710. The powerful king Otumfuo Ansa Sasraku I annexed the Guan and took over the traditional areas of the Kyerepon. According to Akwamu tradition, Otumfuo Ansa Sasraku I, also played an important role in the life of the King Osei Tutu I of Asante by protecting him from the Denkyera.

== Succession ==
History indicates that the Akwamuhene and Dormaahene were twin brothers who were both at Akwamu. However, the two got separated after the death of the Great King Ansa Sasraku about 400 years ago when there was the need to install one of them as the next king. According to history, the kingmakers were divided over who should succeed the king. Some preferred the elder brother while others favoured the younger one. And in order to avoid any conflict, the younger one, the Dormaahene, moved out of Akwamu with his supporters and journeyed through various parts of the country and finally settled at present day Dormaa Ahenkro.

The first President of Ghana, Dr Kwame Nkrumah tried to broker peace between the two traditional areas. During the Nkrumah-powered reunification process which brought the two states together, the Akwamuhene by then, Odeneho Kwafo Akoto II and then Dormaahene, Nana Dr Agyemang Badu I, made a treaty in 1960 to inter-marry so as to keep their blood ties.

== Akwamu regal list ==
| Years | Ruler | Notes |
|---|---|---|
Twifo-Hemang
| c.1505 to c.1520 | Otumfuo Agyen Kokobo, Akwamuhene |
| c.1520 to c.1535 | Otumfuo Ofusu Kwabi, Akwamuhene |
| c.1535 to c.1550 | Otumfuo Oduro, Akwamuhene |
| c.1550 to c.1565 | Otumfuo Addow, Akwamuhene |
Akwamu
| c.1565 to c.1580 | Otumfuo Akoto I, Akwamuhene |
| c.1580 to c.1595 | Otumfuo Asare, Akwamuhene | Founder of the Akwamu State, with capital at Asaremankesse |
| c.1595 to c.1610 | Otumfuo Akotia, Akwamuhene | Relocated capital at Ayandawaase |
| c.1610 to c.1625 | Obuoko Dako, Akwamuhene |
| c.1620 to c.1640 | Ohemmaa Afrakoma, Akwamuhemaa |
| c.1640 to c.1674 | Ansa Saseraku, Akwamuhene (Ansa Saseraku I) |
| c.1674 to c.1689 | Ansa Saseraku, Akwamuhene (Ansa Saseraku II) |
| c.1689 to c.1699 | Otumfuo Ansa Saseraku, Akwamuhene (Ansa Saseraku III) |
| c.1699 to c.1702 | Otumfuo Ansa Saseraku IV, Akwamuhene |
| 1702 to 1725 | Otumfuo Akwano Panyin, Akwamuhene |
| c.1725 to c.1730 | Otumfuo Ansa kwao, Akwamuhene |
| c.1730 to c.1744 | Otumfuo Akonno Kuma, Akwamuhene |
| 1744 to 1747 | Otumfuo Opuku kuma, Akwamuhene |
| c.1747 to c.1781 | Otumfuo Darko Yaw Payin, Akwamuhene |
| c.1781 to c.1835 | Otumfuo Akoto Payin, Akwamuhene |
| c.1835 to c.1866 | Otumfuo Darko Yaw Kuma, Akwamuhene |
| c.1866 to c.1882 | Otumfuo Kwafo Akoto I(Okorforboo), REGENT Akwamuhene |
| c.1882 to c.1887 | Otumfuo Akoto Ababio (Kwame Kenseng), Akwamuhene |
| c.1887 to c.1909 | Otumfuo Akoto Ababio II (Okra Akoto), Akwamuhene |
| c.1909 to c.1910 | Otumfuo Akoto kwadwo (Mensa Wood), Akwamuhene |
| c.1910 to c.1917 | Otumfuo Akoto Ababio III (Emmanuel Asare), Akwamuhene |
| c.1917 to c.1921 | Otumfuo Ansa Sasraku V (Kwabena Dapaa), Akwamuhene |
| c.1921 to c.1937 | Otumfuo Akoto Ababio IV (Emml Asare), Akwamuhene |
| c.1937 to c.1992 | Odeneho Kwafo Akoto II (Kwame Ofei), Akwamuhene |
| c.2011 toc.present | Odeneho Kwafo Akoto III (Bernard Aboagye Owiredu), Akwamuhene |

King

== See also ==
- Akwamufie Palace
