= Nana Asamani =

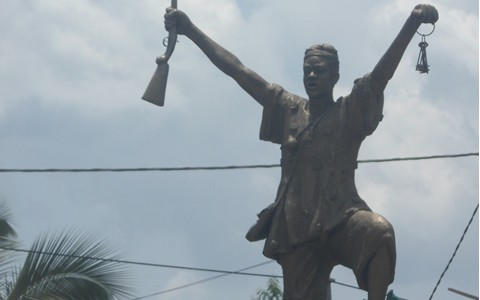
Nana Asamani of the Akwamus

Nana Asamani (or "Asameni") was the first black Governor of Christiansborg Castle, located in Osu, Accra, Ghana, on the coast of the Gulf of Guinea.

Asamani was known as the Akwamuhene who tricked the Danes and seized Christiansborg Castle in 1693. Asamani sold the castle back to the Danes in 1694 for 50 marks of gold, but kept the keys to the castle after the sale.

== Personal life ==
He was known as a businessman who traded with the Danes and the Ga-Adangbe people in Accra. He served as a broker between the Danes, the Ga-Adangbe, and the Akwamu traders.

== Seizure of Christiansborg Castle ==
Asamani planned to seize the castle in 1693. Disguising himself as a cook and interpreter, he studied the traders and merchants who visited the castle, and the arrival and departure of ships. In June 1693, Asamani told the Danes that he and a group of Akwamu traders were visiting to buy ammunition. Asamani and the traders entered the castle under the guise of testing the ammunition before finalizing the purchase, and hid ammunition, powder and shots under their clothes. Asamani attacked the Danes and captured the castle; several Dutch officials were taken as captives.

Asamani replaced the Danish flag with the Akwamu flag. Asamani appointed himself Governor of the castle, where he remained for a full year, and traded with English and Dutch merchants.

The Akwamu kept the 26 silver keys won by Asamani.

== Real world Implication ==
Needs updating
