= Agyen Kokobo =

Founder of the Akwamu kingdom

Agyen Kokobo (fl. c. 1480 – c. 1500) was a southern Akan migrant leader in what is now Ghana. He is believed to have been the earliest leader and founder of the Akwamu kingdom, which he led from around 1480 to around 1500, possibly later. While serving as the Akwamu Chief, Agyen Kokobo ruled the state with his mother as the queen mother. Even today, rulers of the Akwamu kingdom still claim to be descendants of Agyen Kokobo; in the 1960s, one man claimed to be his 28th descendant.

== Biography ==
Agyen Kokobo was a direct descendant of the last king of Kumbu. He was also the nephew of Ofori Besie and Kuruko Booman. The princess Ampranso Akomaso from Dwenemu was brought to Agyen Kokobo to start the royal line. He belonged to the matriarchal clan known as "the Abrade". Within this clan, the authority of the chief's mother was more dominant than that of the male chief himself, as they believed in the proverb, "Homes are made by the wisdom of women". This clan is the "Paramount Stool (throne) of the Akwamu State".

He is known for bringing a group of traders from the forests near the Portuguese fort of Elmina Castle to Kumkunso (now Twifo-Heman), around 1500, where a city was then established. The prosperity of the new establishment is attributed to gold trading, which was further accentuated by early European arrival on the coast. Agyen Kokobo ruled with his mother, the queen mother of the Akamawu state; the major contribution which the Akwamu brought to the Akan was military organization.

He was succeeded by Ofusu Kwabi, who was known for the killing of Ahweaben, the Nzima chief, while in battle in 1515. Still later in the century, under Adow, the clan moved slowly across the inland part of the country, because of conflicts with their Akan neighbours.

== See also ==
- List of rulers of the Akan states of Akwamu and Twifo-Heman
