= List of rulers of the Akan states of Akwamu and Twifo-Heman =

List of rulers of the Akan (Bron) state of Akwamu (formerly Twifo-Heman)

Territory comprised part of present-day southern Ghana

Tenure	Incumbent	Notes
Akwamuhenes (rulers)
Twifo-Heman
c.1480 to c.1500	Otumfour Agyen Kokobo, Akwamuhene	Founder of Twifo-Heman
c.1500 to c.1520	Otumfour Ofusu Kwabi, Akwamuhene
c.1520 to c.1540	Otumfour Oduro, Akwamuhene
c.1540 to c.1560	Otumfour Ado, Akwamuhene
Akwamu
c.1560 to c.1575	Otumfuor Asare, Akwamuhene	Founder of the Akwamu State, with capital at Asaremankesse
c.1575 to c.1585	Otumfour Akotia, Akwamuhene	Relocated capital at Ayandawaase
c.1585 to c.1600	Otumfour Ansa Saseraku, Akwamuhene (Otumfour Ansa Saseraku I)
c.1600 to c.1620	Otumfour Ansa Saseraku, Akwamuhene (Otumfour Ansa Saseraku II)
c.1620 to c.1640	Otumfour Ansa Saseraku, Akwamuhene (Otumfour Ansa Saseraku III)
c.1640 to c.1660	Otumfour Abuako Dako, Akwamuhene
c.1660 to c.1680	Otumfour Afera Kuma, Akwamuhene
c.1680 to 1702	Otumfour Manukure, Akwamuhene
1702 to 1726	Otumfour Akwano Panyini, Akwamuhene
1726 to 1730	Otumfour Dako Booman, Akwamuhene
1730 to 1744	Otumfour Akonno Kuma, Akwamuhene	He led the Akwamu last migration and founded the New Akwamu with capital, Akwamufie

== See also ==
- Akan people
- Ghana
- Gold Coast
- Lists of office-holders
