= Osei Assibey Antwi =

Ghanaian politician

Hon. Osei Assibey Antwi

Mayor of Kumasi
- In office March 2017 – August 2021
- President: Nana Akufo-Addo
- Preceded by: Kojo Bonsu
- Succeeded by: Sam Pyne

National Service Secretariat (Ghana) Executive Director
- In office September 2021 – January 7, 2025
- President: Nana Akufo-Addo
- Preceded by: Mustapha Ussif
- Succeeded by: Ruth Dela Seddoh

Personal details
- Party: New Patriotic Party
- Profession: Accountant

Osei Assibey Antwi is a Ghanaian administrator and politician who is a member of the New Patriotic Party (NPP). He served as the Metropolitan Chief Executive (MCE) of the Kumasi Metropolitan Assembly (KMA) until April 2025. In April 2025, Richard Ofori Agyemang Boadi, popularly known as “King Zuba,” was confirmed as the new MCE/Mayor after securing 55 out of 56 votes from the Kumasi Metropolitan Assembly, following his nomination by President John Dramani Mahama.

== Early life and education ==
Osei Assibey was born in October 1965. He hails from Kumawu Wonoo in the Ashanti Region. He has a Graduate Diploma in Management Studies from Institute of Commercial Management in the United Kingdom. Antwi also holds MBA in Marketing from Paris Graduate School of Management. He is a certified member of the Institute of Commercial Management. Antwi is a member of both Institute of Financial Accountants (IFA), United Kingdom and the International Professional Manager Association, (IPMA), United Kingdom.

== Career ==
He worked at Ghana Revenue Authority the then Internal Revenue Service as an assistant Inspector of Taxes responsible for Financial and Administrative. He also worked as the General Manager of Silkcoat Company Ltd in 2015. He was nominated by President Akufo-Addo to serve as Metropolitan Chief Executive of the Kumasi Metropolitan Assembly (KMA) on 13 March 2017, replacing Kojo Bonsu who had resigned in July 2016. He was confirmed on 17 March 2017 and sworn in by the Ashanti Regional Minister Simon Osei Mensah on 17 April 2017.

In September 2021, Osei Assibey Antwi was appointed as the Director-General of the National Service Secretariat (NSS). He was the successor of Mustapha Ussif, the MP for Yagaba-Kubori, who was appointed the Minister for Youth and Sports.

== Politics ==
Antwi served as Deputy Ashanti Regional Minister from 2006 to January 2009 during the second term of President John Agyekum Kuffuor after he was nominated in October 2006. He has also served in different capacities for the Ashanti Regional caucus of his party. The most notable amongst them is serving as Vice Regional Vice Chairman from 2000 to 2004 under the regional chairman Chairman Frederick Fredua Antoh and from 2004 to 2008, when he served as deputy to Yaw Amankwa. He is also a former parliamentary aspirant for the Manhyia constituency but on two occasions he stood for the primaries he lost to Dr. Kwame Addo Kuffuor, the younger brother of former President John Agyekum Kuffuor and Dr Matthew Opoku Prempeh.

== Corruption Related Charges ==
Osei Assibey Antwi is one of the officials of the Akufo government accused of massive corruption. In October 2025, he was charged together with Gifty Oware-Mensah for allegedly causing financial loss of ¢500,861,744 to the state by authorising payments of allowances to over 60,000 non-existent national service personnel between August 2021 and February 2025. He was additionally charged for allegedly stealing ¢8,080,000 from the NSA while allegedly laundering another GH¢8,256,000 from the Secretariat.

== Legal Issues ==
In February 2026, a court adjourned the trial of Osei Assibey Antwi to 25 February 2026 to allow the prosecution to amend charges following the submission of a performance audit report on the National Service Authority. He has been charged in connection with an alleged “ghost names” payroll scheme during his tenure as executive director and has pleaded not guilty.

In October 2025, the Accra High Court granted him bail to the tune of ¢800 million. Later in December 2025, the High Court revised the bail conditions to ¢120 million with two sureties after the earlier reduction to ¢630 million.

On February 17 of 2026, the trial was adjourned further to February 25 in order for prosecution to amend their case. This was necessitated by the completion of forensic audit by the Auditor General into the operations of National Service Secretariat (Ghana).
