= Subin, Kumasi =

Subin
- Interactive map of Subin
- Coordinates: 6.6919°N 1.6287°W
- Country: Ghana
- Region: Ashanti Region
- Metropolitan Assembly: Kumasi Metropolitan Assembly

Subin, a sub-metro under the Kumasi Metropolitan Assembly, in the Ashanti Region is situated at coordinates 6.6919° N and 1.6287° W.The boundaries of Subin are shared by Bantama in West Kumasi (6.7066° N, 1.6299° W), Asokwa in South Kumasi (6.6701° N, 1.5878° W), Manhyia-South (6.7053° N, 1.6142° W) and Asewase constituency (6.7026° N, 1.6045° W) in North Kumasi, and Nhylaeso Constituency in the West (6.6735° N, 1.6166° W).
