= Kumasi High School =

All male senior high school in Ashanti Region, Ghana

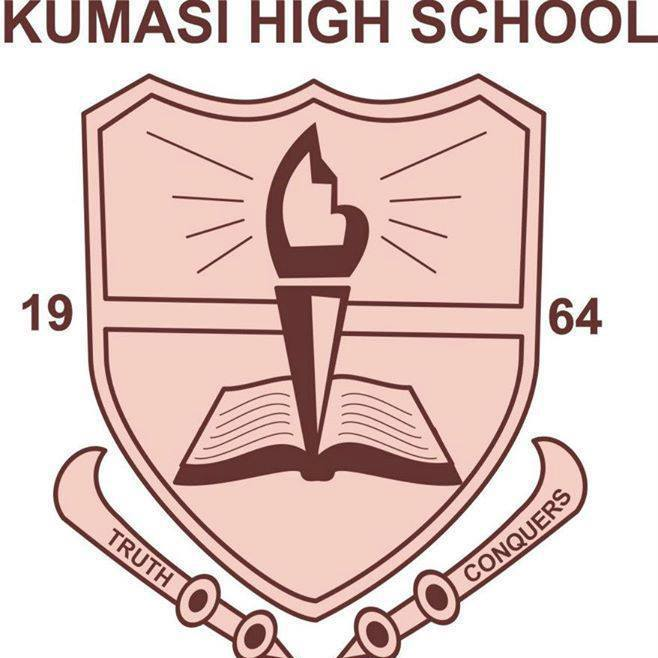

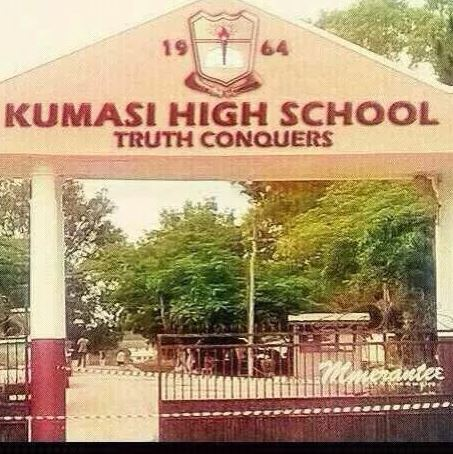
- Kumasi High School entrance

Location
- Gyinyase, Kumasi, Ashanti Region, Ghana; 6°42′13″N 1°38′50″W

Information
- Former name: Kwame Nkrumah SSS
- Type: Public – senior secondary
- Motto: Truth Conquers
- Established: 1964; 62 years ago
- Founder: Dr. S.K. Amoah
- Sister school: Kumasi Girls SHS
- School district: KMA Asokwa Submetro
- Category: A
- President: H.E Gerald Adu Frimpong
- Headmaster: Benjamin Tawiah Twum
- Chaplain: Rev. Dr. Ps. Patrick Owusu
- Staff: 136
- Grades: Senior secondary years 1–3
- Gender: Male
- Enrollment: 2,500
- Average class size: 50
- Classes offered: General Arts, General Science, Agricultural Science, Business & Visual Art
- Color: Peach
- Slogan: Mmerante3
- Athletics: Soccer, hockey, basketball, volleyball, javelin, shot-put, cross-country, tennis
- Nickname: Kuhis
- Affiliation: Kumasi Girls SHS
- Alumni: Mmerante3
- Address: P.O. Box 1247; Kumasi; Ghana
- School anthem: Arise Kuhis

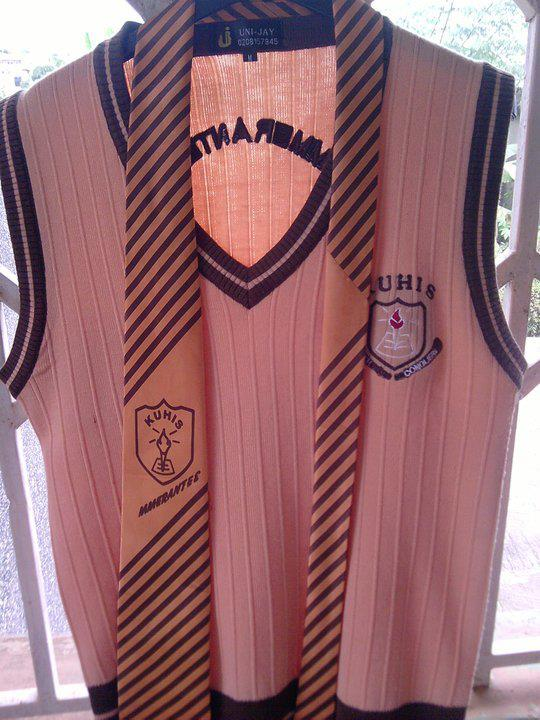
Kumasi High School uniform

Kumasi High School, commonly known as KUHIS, is a Category A public all-boys senior high school located in Kumasi, in the Ashanti Region of Ghana. Established in 1962 by S. K. Amoah, the school has developed a strong reputation for academic excellence, particularly in business education.

KUHIS is noted for its performance in both academics and extracurricular activities. The school has a history of success in the Ashanti Region inter-school competitions and Ashanti Region super zonals. Kumasi High School is tied for the most wins and current runner-up in the Luv FM High School Debate. Kumasi High School also won the inaugural USA Ambassador Business Quiz and is a one-time winner of the Ashanti Regional Science and Maths Quiz, where KUHIS triumphed over city rivals Opoku Ware School and Prempeh College in 2024.

The school has produced notable alumni who have made significant contributions in various fields both nationally and internationally.

The students are known collectively as Mmerantee (Gentlemen).

== History ==
Kumasi High School started as a private institution called Kwame Nkrumah Secondary School under the initiative of S. K. Amoah. In 1963, the School moved to Kwadaso in Kumasi from Asuoyeboa and occupied rented premises.

In the 1965–66 academic year, Amoah's school was absorbed by the government and became a public institution, with the same name as Kwame Nkrumah Secondary School. The school then moved to Kwadaso, another rented premises owned by P. K. Mensah, a contractor whose son was then a student of the school. Albert Appiah, a tutor at Prempeh College, was appointed as the first headmaster of the school. The aftermath of the 1966 military coup d'état that ousted President Nkrumah's regime saw the school's name changed to the present name, Kumasi High School. The school was a mixed institution, and during the 1966/67 academic year, the female students were transferred to Kumasi Girls Secondary School (KUGISS). This paved the way for a boys' school.

In 1977 it moved to occupy its permanent site at Gyinyase, a suburb of Kumasi. In the 1978/79 academic year, the school was authorised to run sixth form courses in business, arts and general science. The school is currently running the Senior High School system.

== Awards and recognition ==
Kumasi High School has earned recognition for its academic and extracurricular accomplishments over the years:

- Best Business School in West Africa: Recognized for excellence in business education from 1989 to 1994
- Ashanti Region Inter-School Soccer Competition: Regional champions in 1997 and 2019
- Best School Cadet in Ghana: Awarded in 2016 for outstanding discipline and performance
- National Science and Maths Quiz (NSMQ): Placed fourth nationally in 2016 and 2017
- US Embassy Nnimdeɛ Business Quiz: Winners of the national competition in 2022
- Luv FM High School Debate: Champions in 2022 and 2024; tied for the most wins and runner-up finishes in the competition
- NSMQ Ashanti Region Championship: Runners-up in 2022 and champions in 2024

== Headmasters ==
Name	Tenure	Notes
Albert Appiah	1965–1974	First headmaster after the school was absorbed into the public system
Mr. Kyeremeh	1974–1977	
K. Amo Asare	1978–1984	Oversaw the school's relocation to Gyinyase near Ahinsan Estate
Asare-Kwaah	1984–1987	
G. Amoateng	1987–1990	
Y. B. Atta	1990–1996	
E. A. Sekyere	1996–1998	
Samuel Mensah	1999–2005	
Michael Obeng Yeboah	2006–2017	Longest serving headmaster
Hall Baidoo	2018–2023	Won several awards for the school
Benjamin Tawiah	2023–present	Current headmaster

== Notable alumni ==
Kumasi High school has educated many prominent people in Ghana and across the world, including;

- Yaw Osei Adutwum, former minister for Education, Ghana & MP for Bosomtwe constituency
- Collins Owusu Amankwah, current MP for Manhyia North Constituency
- Kwadwo Baah-Wiredu, former minister for Finance, Ghana (2004-2008)
- Samuel Boadu, former head coach for Hearts of Oak, Medeama SC & Ghana U-20
- Benhazin Joseph Dahah, former MP, Asutifi North
- Henry Kwabena Kokofu, former MP for Bantama constituency
- Adams Abdul Salam, current MP for New Edubiase constituency

== See also ==
- List of boarding schools
- List of senior secondary schools in Ghana
