= Sokoban, Kumasi =

Town in Ashanti, Ghana

Sokoban is a town in Kumasi in the Ashanti Region of Ghana.

== Town structure ==
The town is under the jurisdiction of the Kumasi Metropolitan Assembly and is in the Nhyiaeso constituency of the Ghana parliament. The town has one of the biggest wood villages in Ghana that was inaugurated by the former President of Ghana John Agyekum Kufuor.The wood village includes the construction of sheds, access roads, electricity and reliable water supply on 12.35 hectares. The project is an 11 million Ghana cedis project, that was jointly funded by Agence Francaise Development and Ghana Government forms part of the Kumasi Roads and Urban Development Project. The project creates a safe to the hardworking wood workers to increase productivity in the timber industry.
