= Jibreel Ofori Owusu =

Ghanaian politician (1948–1998)

Ofori-Owusu Jibreel Kofi

MP for Bantama
- In office 7 January 1993 – 6 January 1997
- President: Jerry John Rawlings

Personal details
- Born: Kofi Jibreel Ofori-Owusu; 23 April 1948 Bantama, Ashanti Region Gold Coast (now Ghana)
- Died: 24 April 1998 (aged 50) Kumasi
- Party: National Democratic Congress
- Children: 8
- Education: Institute of Professional Studies
- Occupation: Politician
- Profession: Accountant

Ofori Owusu Jibreel (23 April 1948 - 24 April 1998) is a Ghanaian politician and member of the first parliament of the Fourth Republic of Ghana representing Bantama constituency under the membership of the National Democratic Congress.

== Early life and education ==
Ofori was born on 23 April 1948. He attended T. I Ahmadiyya Secondary School in Kumasi, and the Institute of Professional Studies (now University of Professional Studies) where he obtained his degree in accounting. He worked as an Accountant before going into parliament.

== Politics ==
He began his political career in 1992 when he became the parliamentary candidate for the National Democratic Congress (NDC) to represent Bantama constituency in the Ashanti Region prior to the commencement of the 1992 Ghanaian parliamentary election. He assumed office as a member of the first parliament of the Fourth republic of Ghana on 7 January 1993 after being pronounced winner at the 1992 Ghanaian election held on 29 December 1992. He lost his seat to the opposition candidate Richard Winfred Anane at the 1996 Ghanaian general election.

== Career ==
He is an accountant by profession and a former member of parliament for the Bantama constituency in the Ashanti Region of Ghana.

== Personal life ==
He is a Christian.
