= Atasemanso =

Town in Ashanti region of Ghana

- Country: Ghana
- Region: Ashanti region

Atasemanso is a town in the Kumasi Metropolis in the Ashanti region of Ghana.

== Town structure ==
The town in under the jurisdiction of the Kumasi Metropolitan Assembly and is in the Nhyiaeso constituency of the Ghana parliament.
