= Stephen Amoah =

Ghanaian politician

Hon. Dr. Stephen Amoah
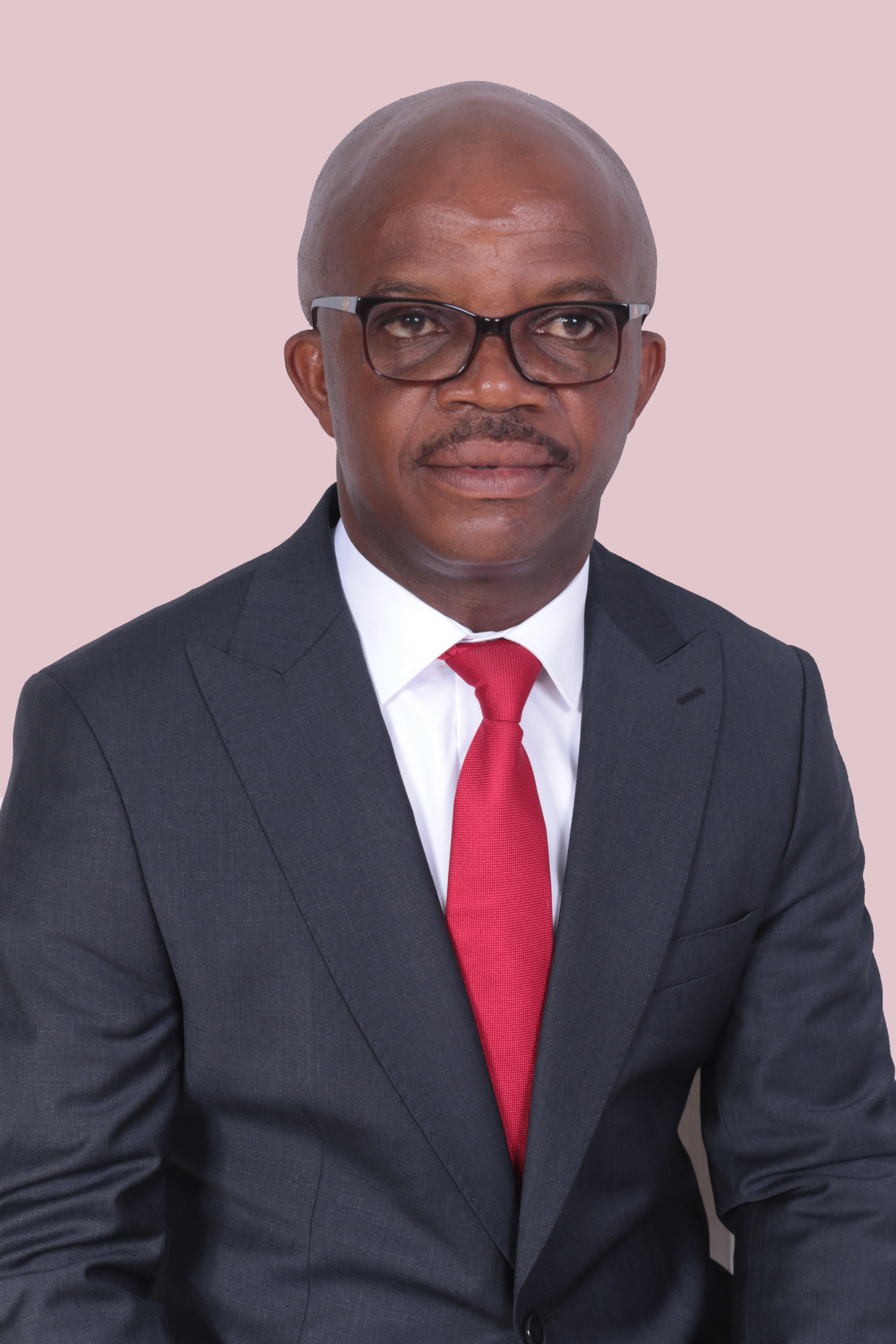

Member of Parliament for Nhyiaeso Constituency, Board Member of GCB Bank
- Incumbent
- Assumed office 7 January 2021
- Preceded by: Kennedy Kwasi Kankam

Personal details
- Born: Stephen Amoah; 27 March 1970 (age 56) Kronum Afrancho, Ghana
- Party: New Patriotic Party
- Occupation: Politician
- Profession: Consultant
- Committees: Finance Committee; Privileges Committee

Stephen Amoah (born 27 March 1970), popularly known as Sticka is a Ghanaian politician who is a member of the New Patriotic Party (NPP). He is the member of the 8th parliament for the Nhyiaeso Constituency. He is currently a board member of GCB Bank.

== Early life and education ==
Stephen Amoah was born on 27 March 1970. He hails from Kronum Afrancho in the Ashanti Region of Ghana. He completed Opoku Ware School, Kumasi. He holds a Master of Science degree in Strategic Finance Management from University of Derby, United Kingdom in 2007. He also had his Bachelor of Science Degree in Computer Science from the Kwame Nkrumah University of Science and Technology (KNUST), Ghana. He also has a Certificate in Entrepreneurship from MIT in 2019. He also holds a PhD in Actuarial Science from KNUST.

== Career ==
Amoah was the Chief Finance Officer of Kencity and also served in the past as the Deputy National Coordinator of the National Insurance Authority (NHIA). In February 2017, He was appointed by President Akufo-Addo as the chief executive officer for the Microfinance and Small Loans Centre (MASLOC). He is the CEO of Zintex Portfolio Services Limited. He is a finance and investment consultant.

=== Football team ===
In August 2022, Amoah established the Kumasi FC which is a football club in Kumasi specifically Nhyiaeso. It is a football academy with training center, gymnasium, medical center and other facilities.

== Politics ==
Amoah stood for the NPP primaries in ahead of the 2020 elections. In June 2020 he won the primaries for the Nhyiaeso Constituency after defeating incumbent member of parliament Kennedy Kwasi Kankam who had unseated Richard Winfred Anane in 2016 NPP primaries.

He won by garnering 332 votes while the incumbent had 315 votes out of the 647 total vote cast.

Amoah was elected member of parliament for Nhyaieso in the 2020 December parliamentary elections. He won the seat after getting 51,531 votes representing 81.71% against his closest contender Richard Kwamina Prah of the National Democratic Congress who had 11,033 votes representing 17.49%.

In 2024 after the death of John Kumah who was the deputy finance minister, Amoah was appointed by the president Nana Addo Danquah Akuffo Addo as the new deputy finance minister effective from April 2, 2024. He won the Nhyiaeso Constituency. parliamentary seat for the 2nd term in the 2024 Ghana general elections.

=== Committees ===
Amoah is a member of the Finance Committee and also a member of the Privileges Committee.

== Personal life ==
Amoah is a Christian.

== Philanthropy ==
In April 2022, Amoah presented printers, computers and over thousand desks to schools in the Nhyiaeso Constituency.

== Controversy ==
In December 2021, the La Magistrate Court issued a bench warrants for the arrest of Amoah and Samuel Anim for their refusal to appear before court for road traffic offenses. He later appeared before the court after presenting himself to the GPS.

In November 2024, it was alleged that he pulled a gun during a rally due to some of the supporters showing off toy guns
