= Kennedy Kwasi Kankam =

Ghanaian politician

Hon. Kennedy Kwasi Kankam

Member of Parliament for Nhyiaeso Constituency
- In office 7 January 2017 – 6 January 2021
- Preceded by: Richard Winfred Anane
- Succeeded by: Stephen Amoah

Personal details
- Born: Kennedy Kwasi Kankam; 22 January 1978 (age 48) Adiebeba, Ghana
- Party: New Patriotic Party
- Occupation: Politician
- Profession: Accountant, Manager
- Committees: Public Accounts Committee; Environment, Science and Technology Committee

Kennedy Kwasi Kankam is a Ghanaian politician and member of the Seventh Parliament of the Fourth Republic of Ghana representing the Nhyiaeso Constituency in the Ashanti Region on the ticket of the New Patriotic Party. He is currently the municipal chief executive for Asokore Mampong Municipal Assembly.

== Early life and education ==
Kankam was born on 22 January 1978 and hails from Adiebeba in the Ashanti Region of Ghana. Being the oldest of four kids, he grew up in a middle-class household. Kennedy was a driven and ambitious student who was committed to succeeding in life. He had his basic education at Nhyiaeso International School in Kumasi from July 1982 to July 1994. He further attended Prempeh College from September 1995 to November 1997. He later went to Christian Service University College where he graduated with a bachelor's degree in administration from 2009 to 2013. He later went to KNUST for his master's degree in accounting from 2014 to 2016. He further went to Oxford University for his diploma in effective writing in September 2017.

== Career ==
Kankam was the managing director for Kekka Company Limited since 2005. He was the deputy administrative manager for Metro Mass Transit Limited from 2002 to 2004. He was the marketing manager for Nick and Cilogar Investment Limited. He is the current captain of the Kumasi Royal Golf Club.

== Politics ==
Kankam is a member of the New Patriotic Party and the former member of parliament for Nhyiaeso Constituency. In June 2020, he lost his parliamentary seat to Stephen Amoah during the NPP's parliamentary primaries. He was nominated by Nana Akufo-Addo and currently the Municipal Chief Executive of the Asokore Mampong Municipality in the Ashanti Region.

=== Committees ===
Kankam was a member of the Public Accounts Committee and also a member of the Environment, Science and Technology Committee.

== Personal life ==
Kankam is a Christian. He is married. He enjoys playing golf and watching football.

== Controversy ==
In June 2021, Kankam was directed by the Auditor-General to recover an amount of about 500,000 Ghana cedis which he gave to over 300 people in the Nhyiaeso Constituency. It was alleged the amount went out as a loan but no recoveries were made.

The audit report states that no attempts have been made to collect the money months after it was disbursed.

“A total of GH500,000.00 was transferred from the MPs Constituency Labour Project Fund and Social Investment Fund to [a privately-owned bank] by the [then] Member of Parliament for Nhyiaeso (Hon. Kennedy Kwasi Kankam), alongside the erstwhile Finance Officer (Mr Daniel Kofi Kankam) and Coordinating Director (Mr Samuel Donkor), for distribution to 430 people on loan, repayable by August 2020”.

== Philanthropy ==
In August 2019, Kankam donated a 33-seater bus and also rented an office for the NPP branch in his constituency.
