= Plug-in electric vehicles in Ghana =

The adoption of plug-in electric vehicles in Ghana is supported by the government through the National Electric Vehicle Policy, launched in December 2023 in Dubai during CORPS 28. This forms part of the country’s strategy to transition toward sustainable transportation and reduce greenhouse gas emissions. The policy seeks to create an enabling environment for electric vehicle adoption, aligned with the National Energy Transition Plan (2022–2070) and Ghana’s international climate commitments. Its phased implementation framework outlines a preparatory stage (2024–2026), a scale-up period aiming for 35% EV penetration by 2035, and a long-term goal to end the sale and import of new petrol and diesel vehicles by 2045. The policy emphasizes principles such as health and safety, equity and fairness, inclusivity, circular economy practices, and battery recycling

== Adoption and market size ==
Between 2017 and 2021, Ghana imported approximately 17,660 plug-in electric vehicles. This number includes motorized electric two- and three-wheelers (≈ 9,431 units) with nearly all (≈ 98%) of these E-2W and E-3W being BEVs.

As of 2023, Energy Minister Matthew Opoku Prempeh disclosed that there were about 17,000 plug-in electric vehicles in use in Ghana.

As of August 2024 there were 7 public charging stations in Ghana, all located in Accra.
