= Kokofu (disambiguation) =

Kokofu is a town in the Ashanti Region of Ghana.

Kokofu may also refer to:

- Henry Kwabena Kokofu (born 1960), Ghanaian politician

== See also ==
- Kokufu, the capitals of the historical Provinces of Japan
- Kokufu-Tagajō Station, Tagajō, Miyagi Prefecture, Japan
