= Rattray Park =

Park and tourist site in Kumasi, Ashanti Region of Ghana

- Interactive map of Rattray Park
- Nearest city: Kumasi
- Area: 42,000 m^{2} (450,000 sq ft)
- Operator: Kumasi Metropolitan Assembly
- Website: http://rattrayparkkumasi.com/

Rattray Park is a recreational and a modern amusement park located in Kumasi in the capital city of the Ashanti Region of Ghana.

== History ==
The park was constructed by the Kumasi Metropolitan Assembly in its bid to restore Kumasi as the Garden City of West Africa. It was inaugurated by the President of Ghana John Dramani Mahama and the Asantehene Otumfuo Nana Osei Tutu II along with the Kumasi Mayor Kojo Bonsu on June 20, 2015.

== Etymology ==
The park was christened Rattray to honour Captain Robert Sutherland Rattray, a Scottish who was the Assistant Colonial Secretary in the Gold Coast and clerk to the Legislative Assembly of Accra in 1919.

== Facilities ==
The park's facilities include an artificial lake, a golf cart, WiFi connection, children's playground, a gym and a 6 square meter dancing fountain which is the first of its kind in the country. There are also other amenities such as restaurants and cafeterias.
