= Old Tafo Municipal District =

- Municipal District
- Districts of Ashanti Region

- Location of Old Tafo Municipal District within Ashanti
- Coordinates: 6°44′9″N 1°36′29″W
- Country: Ghana
- Region: Ashanti
- Capital: Tafo

Area
  - Total: 5 km^{2} (1.9 sq mi)

Population (2021 Census)
  - Total: 114,368
  - Density: 23,000/km^{2} (59,000/sq mi)
- Time zone: UTC+0 (GMT)

Old Tafo Municipal District is one of the forty-three districts in Ashanti Region, Ghana. Originally it was a sub-metropolitan district council within the Kumasi Metropolitan Assembly until 15 March 2018, when it was elevated to municipal district assembly status to become Old Tafo Municipal District. The municipality is located in the central part of Ashanti Region and has Tafo as its capital town.
