= Abdul-Rauf Tanko Ibrahim =

Ghanaian politician

Hon. Abdul-Rauf Tanko Ibrahim

Member of Parliament for Yagaba-Kubori Constituency
- In office 7 January 2009 – 6 January 2013
- President: John Atta Mills; John Mahama
- Succeeded by: Ussif Mustapha

Member of Parliament for Yagaba-Kubori Constituency
- In office 7 January 2005 – 6 January 2009
- President: John Kufuor
- Preceded by: New Constituency

Personal details
- Born: 10 October 1968 (age 57)
- Party: National Democratic Congress
- Profession: Politician, Consultant

Abdul-Rauf Tanko Ibrahim is a Ghanaian politician, a Development Planner/Architect, Quantity Surveyor and member of the Fourth, Fifth and Seventh Parliament of the Fourth Republic of Ghana representing the Yagaba-Kubori Constituency in the North Eastt Region of Ghana on the ticket of the National Democratic Congress.

== Early life and education ==
Abdul-Rauf Ibrahim was born on 10 October 1968. He comes from Yagaba in the North East Region of Ghana. He attended Navrongo Secondary School where he acquired his GCE 'A' Level Certificate in the year 1989.

== Career ==
Abdul-Rauf Ibrahim was the managing director of Tass Kalia Enterprise Limited from 1983 to 2016. He was also the Hajj Chairman at the Office of the President from the year 2013 to 2016. He is a Development Planner, Architect and a Quantity Surveyor.

== Politics ==
Abdul-Rauf Ibrahim is a member of the National Democratic Congress. He contested and won in the 2004 Ghanaian general election on the ticket of the National Democratic Congress for the Yagaba-Kubori constituency which was a new constituency with 6,460 votes out of the 12,080 valid votes cast thus 53.5%. He retained his seat and became a member of the Fifth Parliament of the Fourth Republic of Ghana in the year 2008. In the year 2012, he lost his seat as a member of parliament in the 2012 Ghanaian general election to Ussif Mustapha of the opposition Party, New Patriotic Party. He again stood for the seat again in the 2016 Ghanaian general election and won. As a result, he became a member of the Seventh Parliament of the Fourth Republic of Ghana on the ticket of the National Democratic Congress.

He was also among the twenty one (21) members of the Judiciary committee, he was among the Committee on Roads and Transport composed of eighteen members which have all matters relating to Roads and Transport generally. He was also a member of the Standing Order Committee.

== Personal life ==
Abdul-Rauf Ibrahim is married with six children. He is Muslim by religion.
