= Nhyiaeso, Kumasi =

Nhyiaeso
- Suburb
- Location in Ghana
- Country: Ghana
- Region: Ashanti Region
- District: Kumasi Metropolitan District

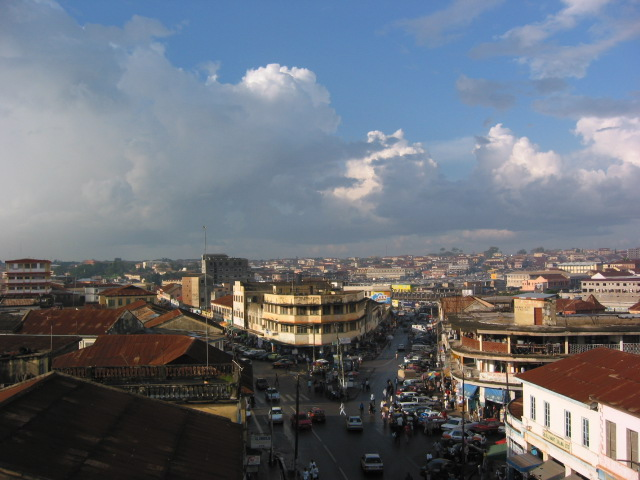
Aerial view of Kumasi in 2003

Nhyiaeso is a suburb of Kumasi. Kumasi is the regional capital of the Ashanti Region of Ghana. It is a residential area in the Kumasi Metropolitan Assembly. It is about 2 kilometres north of the centre of the regional capital. The town is in the Nhyiaeso Constituency. The town is both a residential and business area.

== Adjoining towns ==
The town is bordered on the north by Santasi, on the south and east by Kejetia - Adum and on the west by Danyame.

== Notable places ==
Nhyiaeso is known for its string of hotels and guest houses. Among them are the Royal Lamerta Hotel and Yegoala Hotel. There are several banks in the town, including CAL Bank, Barclays bank, and Standard Chartered. The French government also has a French teaching centre - the Alliance Francais teaching centre. Tigo, one of Ghana's telecommunication companies, has its regional office in the town.

== See also ==
- Nhyiaeso Constituency
