= Rita Agyeman-Budu =

Ghanaian High Court Judge and women's rights advocate (1960 - 2025)

High Court Judge

High Court Judge
- In office July 2016 – July 2025

President, International Association of Women Judges (IAWJ) Ghana Chapter
- In office September 2022 – July 2025

Chair, IAWJ Africa Region

Personal details
- Born: Rita Amaku Ayiku; 19 September 1960 Kumasi, Ghana
- Died: 18 July 2025 (aged 64)
- Spouse: Kwame Agyeman-Budu (m. 1984)
- Children: Dr. Kwaku Agyeman-Budu; Nana Sarpong Agyeman-Budu; Yaw Twumasi Agyeman-Budu
- Education: Mfantsiman Girls Secondary School; Ghana Institute of Journalism; University of Ghana; Ghana School of Law
- Alma mater: University of Ghana; Ghana School of Law; St. John's University Law School
- Occupation: Judge
- Known for: Pioneer Judge, Gender-Based Violence Court; President, IAWJ Ghana Chapter; Chair, IAWJ Africa Region
- Awards: Agostinho Neto Prize for Best Student in English (GIJ, 1991)

Her Ladyship Justice Rita Agyeman-Budu (née Rita Amaku Ayiku) was a distinguished Ghanaian High Court Judge, women's rights advocate and President of the International Association of Women Judges (IAWJ) Ghana Chapter. She was born on September 19, 1960, in Kumasi, Ashanti Region, Ghana. She died in July 2025 at the age of 64, leaving behind a legacy of judicial excellence and advocacy for gender equality.

== Early life and background ==
Rita Amaku Ayiku was born in Kumasi to Mr. Emmanuel Okutu Ayiku, a Chief Telecommunications Inspector from Big Ada, and Elizabeth Serebour, a trader from Adansi Fomena. She was the fourth female in her family, and her early life was shaped by hard work, community values, and modest means.

On September 25, 1961, she was baptised at Bantama Methodist Church which marked the beginning of her lifelong Christian faith. She was formally received into the Methodist Church on May 22, 1977, which happened during her time at Mfantsiman Girls Secondary School.

== Personal life ==
On September 22, 1984, a week after her 24th birthday, Rita married Kwame Agyeman-Budu, the love of her life. Their union was blessed with three children: Dr. Kwaku Agyeman-Budu; born in September 1984, now an academic and Dean of the Law School at the Ghana Institute of Management and Public Administration (GIMPA), Nana Sarpong Agyeman-Budu; born in 1987, Yaw Twumasi Agyeman-Budu (Agya Yaw); born in December 2002 which two decades after her first child.
