= Asokwa =

Town in Kumasi in the Ashanti Region of Ghana

- Town
- Location of Asokwa in Ashanti Region
- Coordinates: 6°30′0″N 01°25′0″W 6° 30' 0" N, 1° 25' 0" W
- Country: Ghana
- Region: Ashanti Region
- District: Asokwa Municipal District
- Time zone: GMT
  - Summer (DST): GMT

Asokwa is a town in Kumasi in the Ashanti Region of Ghana and the capital of the Asokwa Municipal District. The town is also home to the Asokwa Municipal Assembly.

== Town structure ==
The town in under the jurisdiction of the Kumasi Metropolitan Assembly and is in the Asokwa constituency of the Ghana parliament.

== Municipal Assembly ==
The Asokwa Municipal Assembly (AskMA) was carved out of the Kumasi Metropolitan Assembly (KMA) by a Legislative Instrument (L.I.) 2294, 2018 by an Act of Parliament on the 21st day of December, 2017 under section 3 of the Local Governance Act, 2016 (Act 93..
