= Sofo Line, Kumasi =

Sofo Line
- Suburb
- Location in Ghana
- Coordinates: 6°39′N 1°37′W
- Country: Ghana
- Region: Ashanti Region
- District: Kumasi Metropolitan District

Sofo Line is a suburb of Kumasi. Kumasi is the regional capital of the Ashanti Region of Ghana. It is both a residential and industrial area in the Kumasi Metropolitan Assembly. It is about 5 kilometres northwards from centre of the regional capital.

== Notable place ==
Prempeh College a single-sexed second cycle school is in the town. It is a mission school under both the Methodist Church, Ghana and the Presbyterian Church, Ghana.
