= Kojo Bonsu =

Ghanaian businessman and politician

Hon. Kojo Bonsu
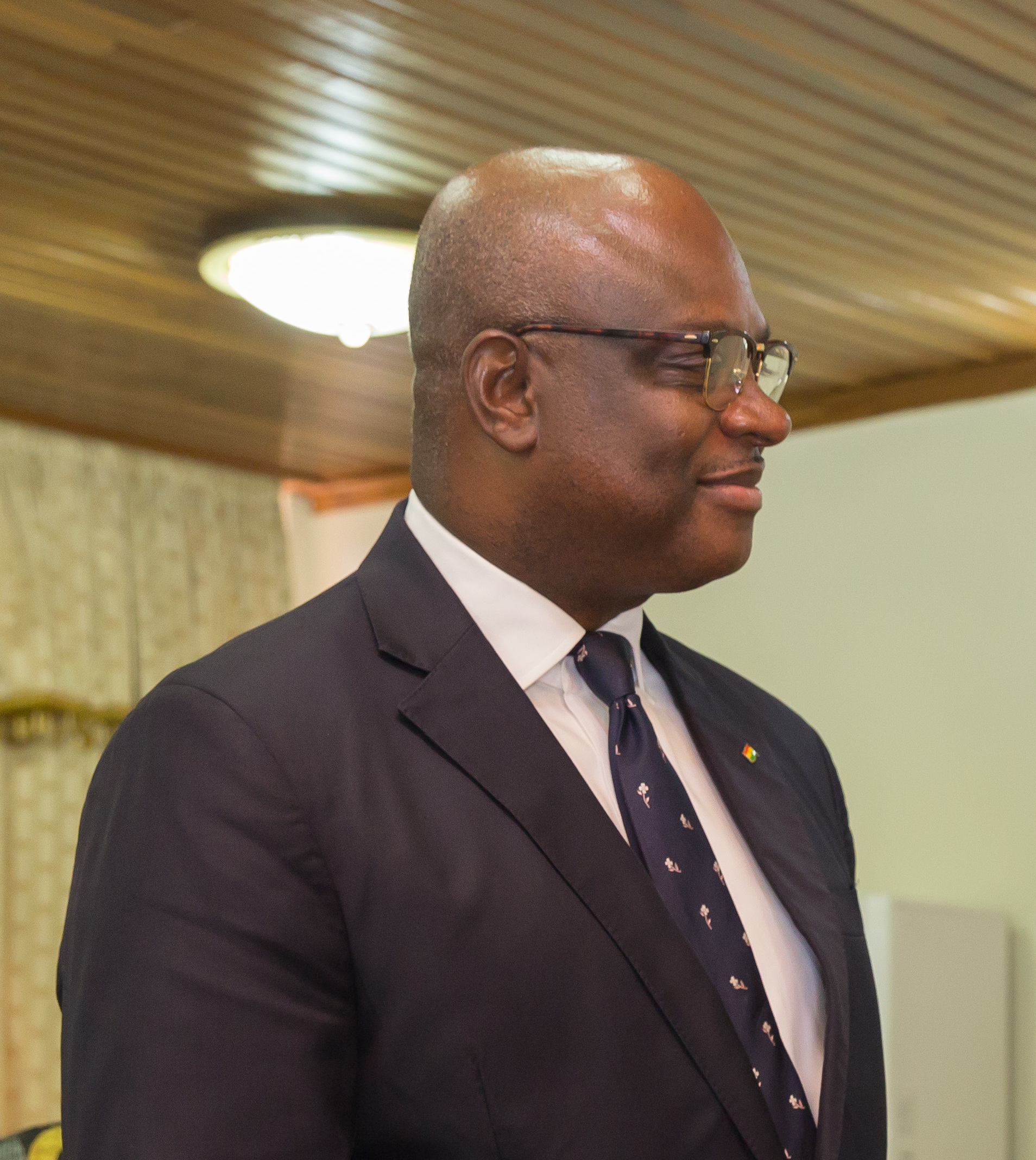
- A picture of Kojo Bonsu

Mayor of Kumasi
- In office March 2013 – July 2016
- Preceded by: Samuel Sarpong
- Succeeded by: Osei Assibey Antwi

Personal details
- Party: National Democratic Congress
- Profession: Businessman, Sports administrator, Politician

Kojo Bonsu (born Michael Kojo Bonsu or Mensa - Bonsu) is a Ghanaian businessman, sports administrator, and politician, who served as the Metropolitan Chief Executive of the Kumasi Metropolitan Assembly from 2013 to 2016. He is a member of the National Democratic Congress. He has been appointed as Ghana's Ambassador to China.

== Early life and education ==
Bonsu is a native of Offinso, a town in the Ashanti Region of Ghana. He had his Ordinary Level education at the Tamale Secondary School, between 1974 and 1979. Lack of water was one of the challenges he experienced on campus. It was there that his dream of becoming a football administrator begun. He got admission at the Drayton School in London, however, due to several businesses he was handling at the time, he was unable to enroll himself. Between 1985 and 1990, when Bonsu joined giant sports kit manufacturers, Adidas, he enrolled into their football Business Unit at Herzogenaurach, Germany, and in the process obtained a Diploma in Sports Business and Marketing. He holds a master's degree in International Relations.

== Career ==
=== Early career ===
After completing his training in sports Business and marketing, Bonsu worked with Adidas and became their first representative in West Africa and served as an Assistant Marketing Officer. He rose to become the kit maker's manager in Ghana and the whole of West Africa. Within which period he brokered deals between the company and the Ghana football Association specifically the Ghana football national team.

== Family ==
Bonsu has nine biological siblings. They shared a home in Offinso, a town in Ghana's Ashanti region, but as they grew older, their lives started to diverge. His mother was a respected Offinso Queen Mother who was wed to a rigid military officer.

=== Football administration ===
"You were the key advocate on the board when the monumental decision to rebrand GOIL was taken – the results of which have seen GOIL being propelled to the number one position (retail) among oil marketing companies in Ghana”.

— Citation of Honour by managing director of GOIL, Mr. Patrick A.K. Akorli, 19 October 2015.

He is a director of Tamale-based club Real Tamale United. Bonsu was also an executive member of Asante Kotoko. In 2003, he launched his bid to be the Ghana Football Association's President. He went against former president of the GFA Kwesi Nyantakyi, politician and executive member of Accra Hearts of Oak, Vincent Odotei Sowah, a former FA vice-chairman, Joseph Ade Coker and former executive council chairman, Y.A Ibrahim. He subsequently lost to Kwesi Nyantakyi in the elections in December 2005.

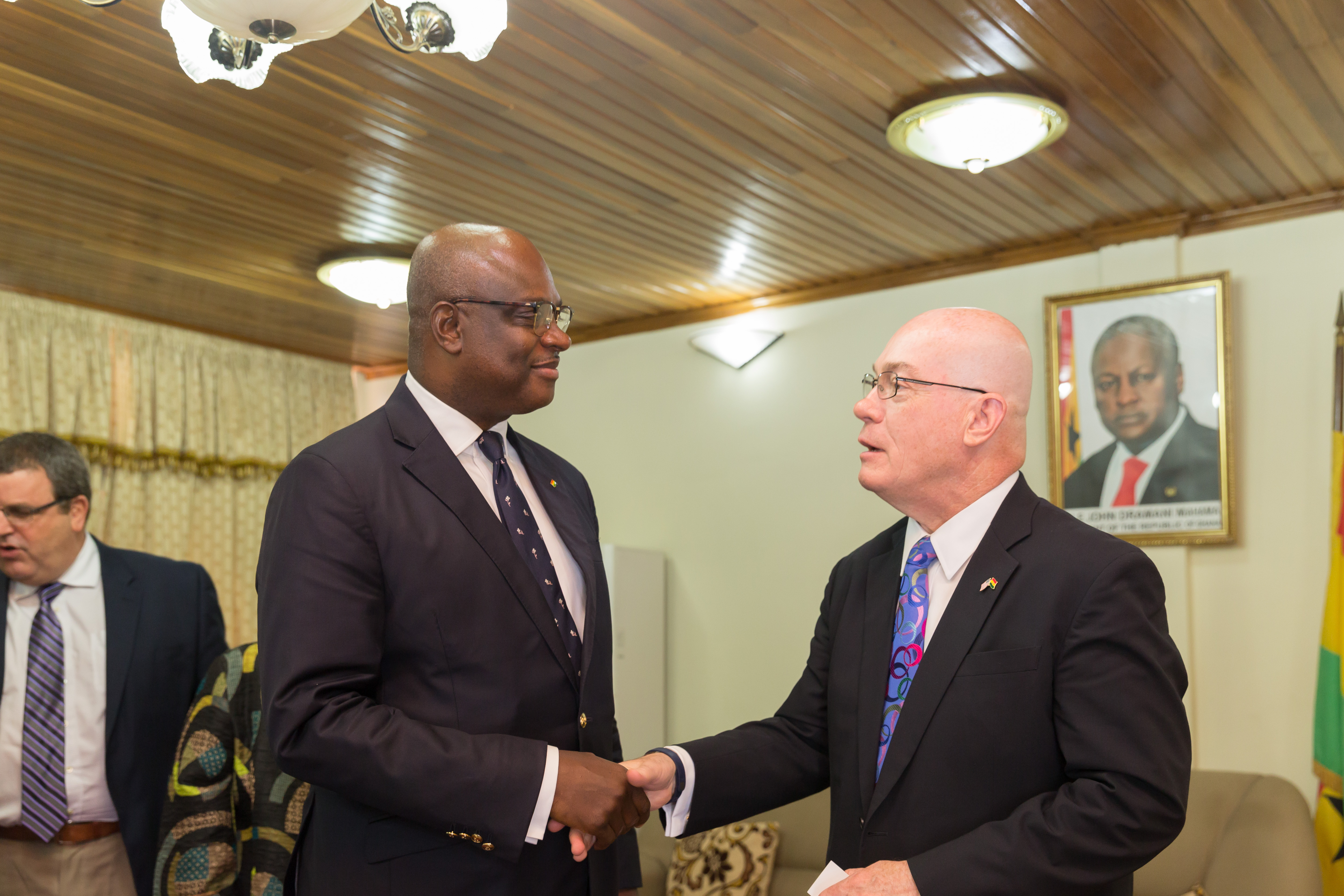
Bonsu interacting with US Ambassador Robert P. Jackson during his visit to Kumasi

In January 2010, Bonsu was appointed board chairman of the National Sports Authority then a council under the Ministry of Youth and Sports. Bonsu is known to have spearheaded the rebranding of the sports council until it subsequently became a sports authority.

=== Ghana At 50 ===
As part of Ghana's 50th Anniversary Celebration, Bonsu organised the second largest event dubbed “Ghana As One Gala Night” at Ghana's Black Star Square with International artists; The Whispers, The Shalamar, Pat Thomas, AB Cresntil, Gyedu Blay Amboley, Paapa Yankson and Ola Williams.

=== Managing Director of Goil ===
Bonsu served as a board member for Ghana Oil Company (GOIL) from July 2009 to April 2015. He also became the acting managing director of the company after the long-serving managing director Yaw Agyemang-Duah, retired after serving with the company for 16 years.

He served in the managing director role from July 2011 to February 2012. In October 2015, He was acknowledged and honoured by the company for playing a key role in the company's rebranding process.

=== Mayor of Kumasi ===
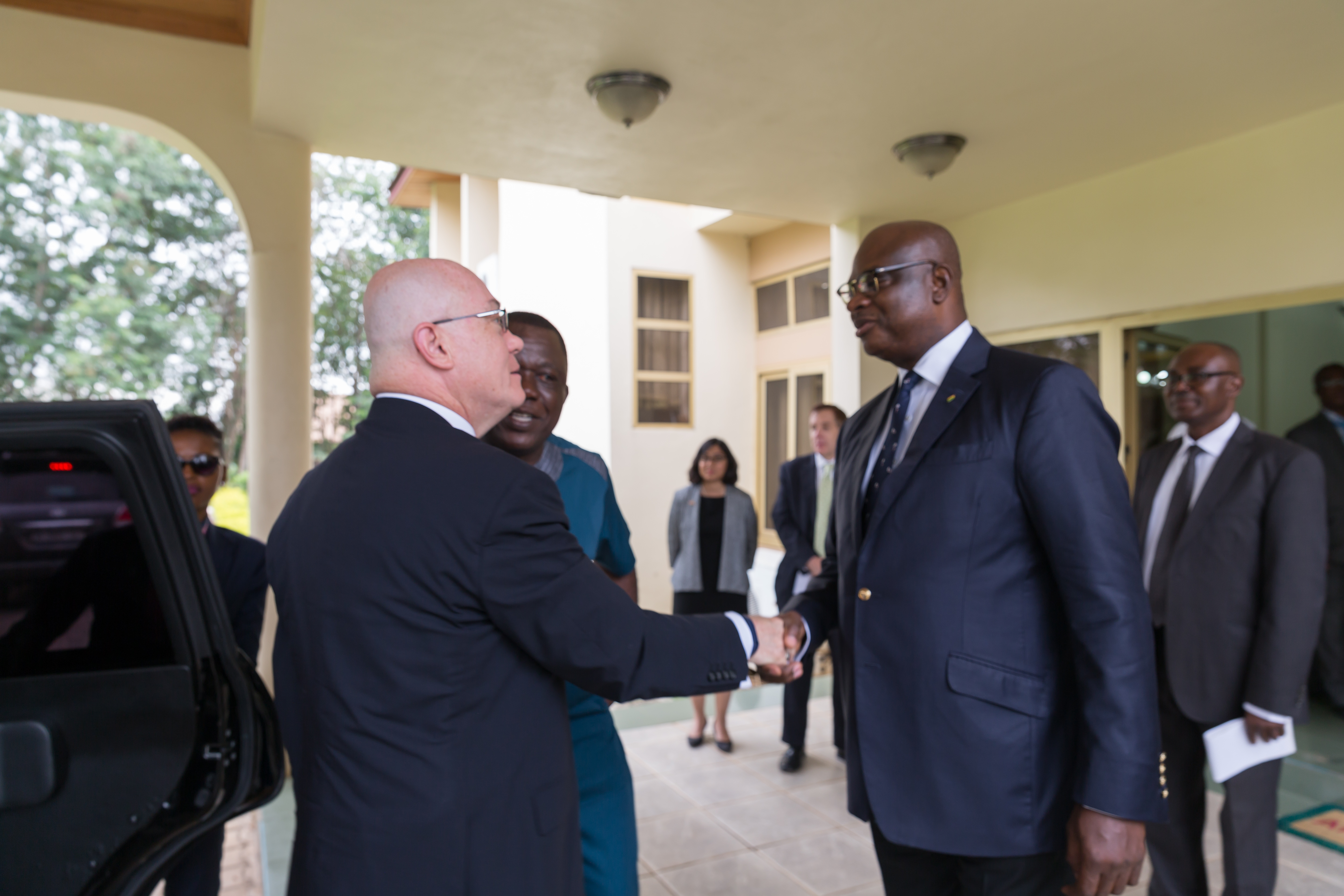
Mayor Kojo Bonsu with US Ambassador Robert P. Jackson during his visit to Kumasi.

In 2013, President John Dramani Mahama nominated Bonsu for the position of Metropolitan Chief Executive for the Kumasi Metropolitan Assembly. In July 2016, he vacated his office and resigned after the Kumasi Traditional Council called him to order for his decision to take Nana Agyenim Boateng, the Amoamanhene, off the Kejetia project board without giving a notice to Otumfuo Nana Osei Tutu II, the Asantehene.

As the Mayor of Kumasi, he was resisted severally by stakeholders, including traditional authorities, market women, and some key players, due to his predecessors inability to fulfill their mandates.

In his mandate as the Mayor, he built the first ever recreational facility, the Kumasi Rattray Park.

In 2014, he secured a loan facility from the Deutsche Bank UAE through parliamentary approval to build the largest modern market in West Africa, the Kejetia Market, called the "Kejetia Dubai," completed in 2017. He also built the Asawase market, Tafo market, and Atonsu-Agogo market. He renovated the Kumasi Prempeh Assembly Hall

He is the founder and former publisher of Agoo Magazine, an African lifestyle magazine that was founded in 2001.

== Political career ==
Ahead of the 2020 elections, in September 2018 towards the National Democratic Congress' Presidential primaries he declared his intention to contest as Party's president flagbearership role. In December 2018, he announced his decision to drop out of the race for the role and threw his support to whoever would emerge winner at the end of the primaries.

Again, ahead of the 2024 elections, Kojo Bonsu expressed confidence in his ability to lead the National Democratic Congress (NDC) into the general election of 2024 by winning the party's presidential primary. After delegates voted in the primaries on 13 May 2023, Mahama received 98.9% of the vote, while Kojo Bonsu, received 1.1%, making Mahama the clear winner.

== Personal life ==
He is an avid supporter of Ghanaian-based club Asante Kotoko and Tottenham Hotspur F.C. He speaks fluent French.
