= Patricia Appiagyei =

Ghanaian politician (born 1956)

Hon. Mrs. Patricia Appeagyei
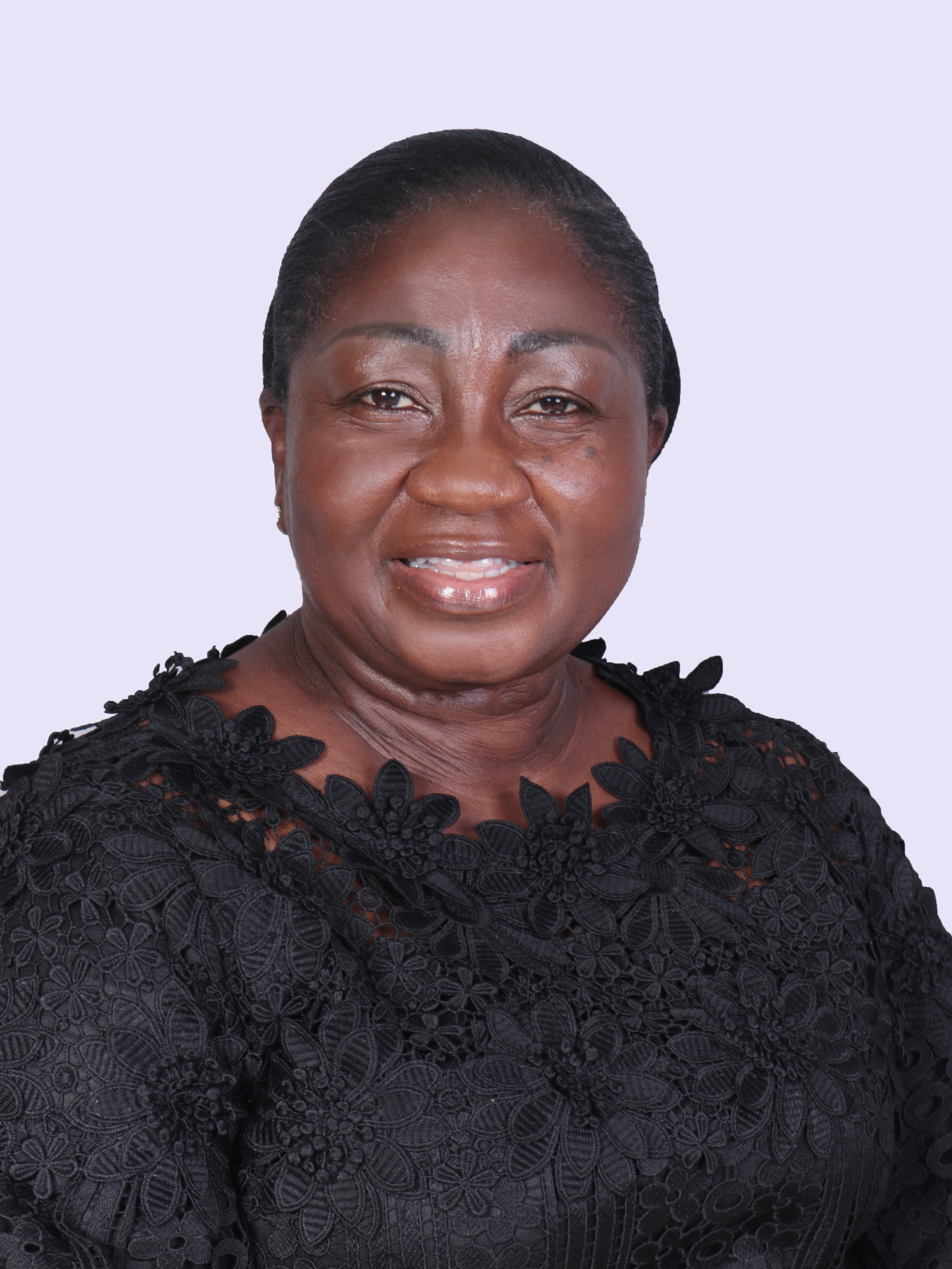
- PATRICIA APPIAGYEI.jpg

Deputy Minister for Ministry of Environment, Science, Technology and Innovation (Ghana)
- Incumbent
- Assumed office March 2017
- President: Nana Akufo-Addo

Member of Ghanaian parliament for Asokwa constituency
- Incumbent
- Assumed office 7 January 2013
- Preceded by: Maxwell Kofi Jumah

Mayor of Kumasi
- In office 2005–2009
- President: John Kufour
- Preceded by: Maxwell Kofi Jumah

Personal details
- Born: 28 November 1956 (age 69) Accra, Ghana
- Party: New Patriotic Party
- Education: KNUST
- Profession: Economic developer
- Committees: Lands and Forestry Committee; Appointments Committee

Patricia Appiagyei (born 28 November 1956) is a Ghanaian politician, one-time Deputy Ashanti Regional Minister and the first female mayor of Kumasi Metropolitan Assembly. She is the Member of Parliament (MP) in the Seventh Parliament of the Fourth Republic of Ghana and the 8th Parliament of the Fourth Republic of Ghana, representing Asokwa Constituency. She is a member of the New Patriotic Party in Ghana.

== Early life and education ==
Appiagyei was born on 28 November 1956 in Kumasi and hails from Konongo/Asawase-Kumasi, in the Ashanti Region of Ghana. She had her secondary education at the St Louis Senior Secondary in Kumasi and proceeded to Kwame Nkrumah University of Science and Technology, where she studied BA Social Science Economics/Law in 1980.She further did her Post graduate diploma- Development Economics in 1988.

== Career ==
Appiagyei previously worked with City Investments Company Limited as the executive director of marketing from 1995 to 2010. She was also previously the mayor of Kumasi.

== Politics ==
Appiagyei was a Deputy Minister for Ashanti region from 2001 to 2005 and was shortly appointed a Deputy Ashanti Regional Minister in 2005. From 2005 to 2009 she served as the Municipal Chief Executive for Kumasi. She is currently the Member of Parliament (MP) for Asokwa Constituency after beating former deputy Local Government minister, Maxwell Kofi Jumah, to win the New Patriotic Party (NPP) primary election and subsequently won the parliamentary seat during the 2016 Ghanaian general elections. She won the 2020 general election to represent her constituents in the 8th Parliament of the Fourth Republic of Ghana. Hon Patricia Appiagyei is currently the most experienced female NPP member of Parliament.

In 2017, she was appointed by Nana Akufo-Addo and approved by parliament to serve as the deputy minister for Environment, Science and Technology and Innovation. She is a board member for the Nuclear Power Ghana.

In February 2024, she assumed the role of deputy majority leader in parliament after Alexander Afenyo-Markin was promoted from deputy majority leader to the position of majority leader due to Osei Kyei-Mensah-Bonsu resignation from the role.

=== Committees ===
Appiagyei is a member of the Lands and Forestry Committee and also a member of the Appointments Committee.

== Personal life ==
Appiagyei is the second wife of Dr K. K. Sarpong, a former CEO of Kotoko FC and Ghana National Petroleum Corporation, and has three children. She is a practicing Christian.

== Philanthropy ==
In July 2021, she paid visits to some areas in Kumasi including Old Asokwa, Kaase, Asokwa Extension, Atonsu and Agogo which got flooded after a two-day downpour. She assured the people affected of a new market place. She also visited the New Bethel Presbyterian Primary and JHS.
