= Maxwell Kofi Jumah =

Ghanaian politician (born 1950)

Hon Maxwell Kofi Jumah

Member of parliament for Asokwa Constituency
- In office 7 January 2005 – 6 January 2013
- Succeeded by: Patricia Appiagyei

Deputy Minister for Local Government and Rural Development
- In office 7 August 2007 – 6 January 2009
- President: John Agyekum Kufour

Mayor of Kumasi
- In office 2001–2004
- President: John Agyekum Kufour
- Preceded by: Nana Akwasi Agyeman
- Succeeded by: Patricia Appiagyei

Personal details
- Born: 26 June 1950 (age 76) Antoa, Ghana
- Party: New Patriotic Party
- Spouse: Married
- Education: Rutgers University
- Profession: Manager/Administrator

Maxwell Kofi Jumah (born 26 June 1950) is a Ghanaian politician and a former Mayor of Kumasi, former Member of Parliament for the Asokwa Constituency in the Ashanti Region.

== Early life and education ==
Jumah hails from Amakom Antoa in the Ashanti Region of Ghana. He was born on the 26 June 1950 in his hometown. Kofi Jumah holds a Master in Business Administration Degree in Finance and International Marketing from Rutgers University Graduate School of Management, United States of America in 1983. He is an old student of Prempeh College.

== Career ==
Jumah worked as the managing director of GIHOC Distilleries Company Limited (GDCL) His appointment was terminated in January 2025.

== Political career ==
In May 2001, Jumah was appointed by then-President of the Republic of Ghana, John Agyekum Kufuor as the Kumasi Chief Executive of the Kumasi Metropolitan Assembly. He then proceeded to represent Asokwa Constituency after winning his poll in the 2004 Ghanaian General Elections. He continued to represent his Constituency in 5th parliament of the 4th republic of Ghana after being re-elected in the 2008 Ghanaian General Elections. In August 2007, he was sworn in as deputy local government rural and development Minister by the President of the Republic of Ghana, John Agyekum Kufuor. He served in that role till 6 January 2009 when power was handed over to the John Evan Atta Mills government.

== Elections ==
Jumah was elected as the member of parliament for the Asokwa constituency of the Ashanti Region of Ghana for the first time in the 2004 Ghanaian general elections. He won on the ticket of the New Patriotic Party. His constituency was a part of the 36 parliamentary seats out of 39 seats won by the New Patriotic Party in that election for the Ashanti Region. The New Patriotic Party won a majority total of 128 parliamentary seats out of 230 seats. He was elected with 42,942 votes out of 55,771 total valid votes cast. This is equivalent to 77% of total valid votes cast. He was elected over Mahama Nyaba of the People's National Convention, Ishmael Butler of the National Democratic Congress, Peter Amankwa of the Convention People's Party and Kobina Amo-Aidoo an independent candidate. These obtained 660, 9,155, 512 and 2,502 votes respectively of total valid votes cast. These were equivalent to 1.2%, 16.4%, 0.9% and 4.5% respectively of total valid votes cast.

In 2008, he won the general elections on the ticket of the New Patriotic Party for the same constituency. His constituency was part of the 34 parliamentary seats out of 39 seats won by the New Patriotic Party in that election for the Ashanti Region. The New Patriotic Party won a minority total of 109 parliamentary seats out of 230 seats. He was elected with 34,801 votes out of 55,819 total valid votes cast. This was equivalent to 62.35% of total valid votes cast. He was elected over Kwaku Baah Bonsu of the National Democratic Congress and Gyimah Akwanuasah an independent candidate. These obtained 7,653 and 13,365 votes respectively of total valid votes cast. These were equivalent to 13.71% and 23.94% respectively of the total votes cast.

== Personal life ==
Jumah is married with 5 children. He is a Christian.

== Controversy ==
On April 29, 2026, Jumah was arrested by the Economic and Organised Crime Office (EOCO) as part of an ongoing investigation into alleged financial irregularities. His arrest was followed by a raid on his Kumasi residence. He was granted a bail bond of GHS 55 million.

== Honours and awards ==
In June 2019, Jumah was awarded at the third edition of the Ghana Manufacturers Awards as the chief executive officer (CEO) of the Year for his work at Best GIHOC Distilleries Company Limited.
