= Nana Akwasi Agyeman =

Ghanaian politician

Barima Nana Akwasi Agyeman was a Ghanaian civil servant and a member of the Asante Royal family who served as Mayor of Kumasi serving as Metropolitan Chief Executive (MCE) for the Kumasi Metropolitan Assembly. He was popularly known as Okumkom, literally meaning ''killer of hunger''. He is the longest serving mayor of Kumasi serving for over 20 years as mayor. He died at the age of 86. He was a prominent member of National Democratic Congress.

== Early and family life ==
Agyeman was born into the Oyoko Royal family and was a member of the Asante Royal family until his death. He was reported to have been in a pole position amongst those who were shortlisted to be the Asantehene in both 1970 and in 1999, but eventually wasn't selected.

== Career and politics ==
Agyeman served as Mayor of Kumasi and chairman of Kumasi Metropolitan Assembly during the Supreme Military Council government of late Head of state Ignatius Kutu Acheampong in 1977. He continued in that capacity through the presidency of Hilla Limann in 1979 to 1981 and also during the era of Jerry John Rawlings till he was replaced in January 2001 by Maxwell Kofi Jumah.

He was a member of the National Democratic Congress and considered as a close confidant of Jerry John Rawlings. Whilst serving as Mayor of Kumasi in the 1990s, he was appointed by Jerry John Rawlings to serve also as a Deputy Minister of Science and Environment. Agyeman also served as a special envoy in his latter days in the public sector to Jerry John Rawlings whilst he was in government.

== Death and burial ==
Agyeman died 14 January 2020 at Komfo Anokye Teaching Hospital in Kumasi after an illness. His funeral and burial took place from 24 February to 27 February 2020 and was chaired by the Asantehene, Otumfuo Osei Tutu at the Manhyia Palace as Agyeman was a royal. The funeral was well attended by politicians, civil servants and high-profile personalities in Ghana including former presidents; Jerry John Rawlings and his wife Nana Konadu Agyeman-Rawlings, John Kufuor and John Dramani Mahama. President Nana Akufo-Addo and his vice president Bawumia were also present.

== See also ==
- Kumasi Metropolitan Assembly
- List of rulers of Asante
- Jerry John Rawlings
