= Cecilia Dapaah =

Ghanaian politician (born 1954)

Hon. Cecilia Abena Dapaah

Minister for Sanitation and Water Resources
- In office September 2018 – 22 July 2023
- President: Nana Akufo-Addo

Member of Parliament for Bantama Constituency
- In office 7 January 2005 – 6 January 2013
- Preceded by: Richard Winfred Anane
- Succeeded by: Henry Kwabena Kokofu

Personal details
- Born: 27 November 1954 (age 71)
- Party: New Patriotic Party
- Children: 1
- Education: University of Ghana, Atlanta Institute of Management

Cecilia Abena Dapaah (born 27 November 1954) is a Ghanaian politician. She is a member of the New Patriotic Party and a former Member of Parliament for the Bantama constituency. She served as the deputy Minister for Water Resources, Works and Housing, and Minister for Aviation and Santitation and Water Resources respectively.

== Early life and education ==
Cecilia Abena Dapaah was born on 27 November 1954 hails from Mpasatia in the Ashanti Region. She attended the University of Ghana, and graduated with a Bachelor of Arts degree in French and linguistics in 1979. She holds a certificate in leadership from the Harvard Kennedy School, and a postgraduate certificate in International Development Studies from the University of Oslo.

== Political life ==
Dapaah was a development worker by profession and a special assistant to President John Kufour. In 2001, she was appointed the chairperson of the Board of Ghana Cocoa Processing Company. She was moved from the board in 2005, and made the deputy Minister for Water Resources, Works and Housing. In 2007, she was made a substantive minister till the end of the John Kufour administration in 2008.

Cecilia Dapaah was a member of the Parliament of Ghana from 2005 to 2013. She served on various parliamentary committees in Ghana including Works and Housing; Advisory Committee to the Speaker of the Parliament; Employment, Social welfare and Youth; Foreign Affairs; and Special Budget.

=== Member of Parliament ===
Dapaah was elected as the member of parliament for the Bantama constituency of the Ashanti Region of Ghana for the first time in the 2004 Ghanaian general elections. She won on the ticket of the New Patriotic Party. Her constituency was a part of the 36 parliamentary seats out of 39 seats won by the New Patriotic Party in that election for the Ashanti Region. The New Patriotic Party won a majority total of 128 parliamentary seats out of 230 seats. She was elected with 41,064 votes out of 49,174 total valid votes cast equivalent to 83.5% of total valid votes cast. She was elected over Alhasan Napoh of the National Democratic Congress and Yaw Owusu Boafo of the Convention People's Party. These obtained 14.8% and 1.7% respectively of total valid votes cast.

In 2008, she won the general elections on the ticket of the New Patriotic Party for the same constituency. Her constituency was part of the 34 parliamentary seats out of 39 seats won by the New Patriotic Party in that election for the Ashanti Region. The New Patriotic Party won a minority total of 109 parliamentary seats out of 230 seats. She was elected with 36,708 votes out of 48,476 total valid votes cast equivalent to 75.72% of total valid votes cast. She was elected over Nana Osei Akoto-Kuffour of the National Democratic Congress, Osei-Tutu Richard of the Convention People's Party, Eunice Owusu-Ansah of the Reformed Patriotic Democrats and Stephen Kwaku Saahene an independent candidate. These obtained 14.45%, 5.52%, 0.91% and 3.39% respectively of the total votes cast.

=== Minister for Aviation ===
On 7 January 2017, President Akuffo-Addo nominated her for the position of Minister of Aviation. She was vetted by the Appointments Committee of the Parliament of Ghana on 8 February 2017. During her vetting, she testified that she would improve the aviation industry in Ghana, and that her priority was to restart a national carrier by 2019. She was of the view that the unavailability of the carrier was depriving Ghana of several millions of cedis in revenue. The last national carrier was Ghana International Airlines, which collapsed in 2010. In March 2017, she announced that Ghana was progressing with its desire to become the aviation hub of the West African region.

=== Minister for Sanitation and Water Resources ===
Dapaah was moved to the Ministry of Sanitation and Water Resources in 2018. She was made caretaker Minister for Gender, Children and Social Protection for a year (2021–2022). She served in her role as Minister for Sanitation and Water Resources before resigning on July 22, 2023, due to an alleged scandal involving the stealing of $1,000,000, €300,000 and Millions in local currency by her house helps from her bedroom.

==== Controversy ====
According to a press statement released by the Office of the Special Prosecutor (OSP), Dapaah was taken into custody on Monday, July 24, 2023, at 11:55 GMT. The arrest was connected to alleged corruption and corruption-related activities involving substantial sums of money and valuable items, which were reportedly stolen from her residence in 2022 by two of her domestic workers.

One Madam Hannah Fosua, said to be the wife of a former driver of the Minister claimed her husband lost his job working for Ms Dapaah because he drew attention to the behaviour of the accused persons.

Andy Appiah-Kubi, the Member of Parliament for Asante-Akim North suggested on TV3 that President Nana Addo Dankwa Akufo-Addo should have kept his comments about the innocence or otherwise of the Minister to himself.

In September 2023, the Accra High Court ordered the Office of the Special Prosecutor to unfreeze and return the money in her bank accounts. The office obeyed the directive but later froze her bank account again and her investments. The office returned her seized cash amounts.

== Personal life ==
Dapaah is married with one child. She is a member of the Methodist Church.

== See also ==
- List of MPs elected in the 2004 Ghanaian parliamentary election
- List of MPs elected in the 2008 Ghanaian parliamentary election
