= Danyame, Kumasi =

Danyame
- Suburb
- Location in Ghana
- Coordinates: 6°39′N 1°37′W
- Country: Ghana
- Region: Ashanti Region
- District: Kumasi Metropolitan District

Danyame is suburb of Kumasi. Kumasi is the regional capital of the Ashanti Region of Ghana. It is a residential area in the Kumasi Metropolitan Assembly. It is about 1 kilometre northwards from centre of the regional capital.

== Notable place ==
The town has the northern command's officers mess. It also has several hotels and guest houses including:

- Mikilin Hotel
- Georgia hotel
- Lé Grand's Pub (and grill house)
