= Kronom =

Community in Ashanti Region, Ghana

- Town
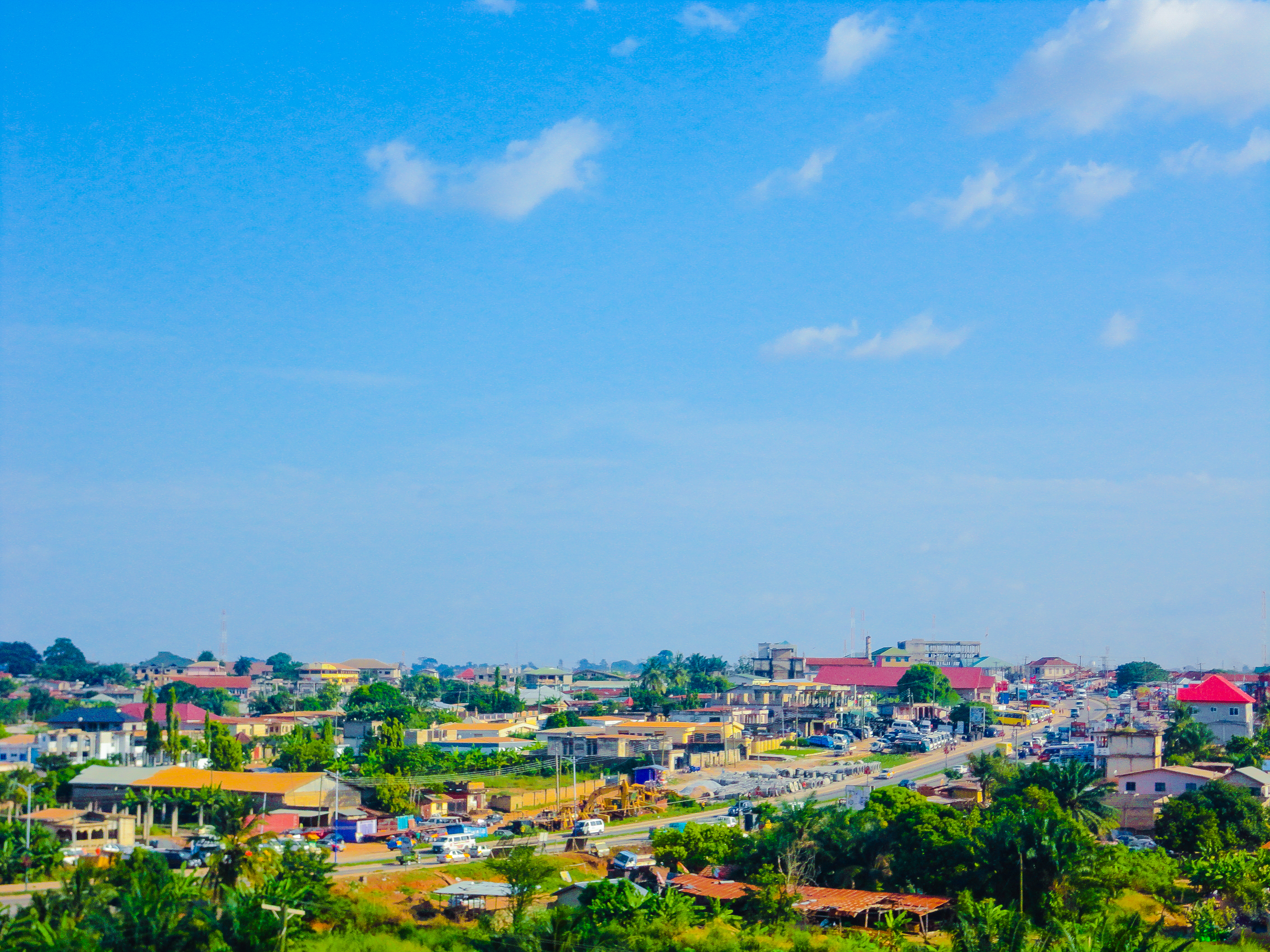
- Country: Ghana
- Region: Ashanti Region
- District: Suame Municipality

Population
  - Total: —
- Time zone: GMT
  - Summer (DST): GMT

Kronom or Kronum is a suburb of Kumasi and a town in the Suame Municipality in the Ashanti Region of Ghana. Kronum is situated on the Suame-Offinso highway. The suburb is bounded to the south by Bremang and to the north by Afrancho.
