= Manhyia North =

Constituency in the Ashanti Region of Ghana

- constituency for the Parliament of Ghana
- District: Kumasi Metropolitan Assembly
- Region: Ashanti Region of Ghana

Current constituency
- Party: New Patriotic Party
- MP: Akwasi Konadu

Manhyia North is one of the constituencies represented in the Parliament of Ghana. It elects one Member of Parliament (MP) by the first past the post system of election. Manhyia North is located in the City of Kumasi Metropolitan District of the Ashanti Region of Ghana.

== Boundaries ==
The seat is located within the Kumasi Metropolitan District of the Ashanti Region of Ghana.

== Members of Parliament ==
Election	Member	Party
2012	Collins Owusu Amankwah	New Patriotic Party
2016	Collins Owusu Amankwah	New Patriotic Party
2020	Akwasi Konadu	New Patriotic Party

Ghana Parliamentary Election, 2016 : Manhyia North
Party	Candidates	Votes	%	+/_
New Patriotic Party	Collins Owusu Amankwah	36,299	71.80	
National Democratic Congress	Yahuza Abdul Rahman	10,955	21.67	
Progressive Peoples Party (Ghana)	Bertrin Amponsah Britwum	2,868	5.67	
People National Convention	Sheihu Mangah	265	0.52	
Great Consolidated Peoples Party	Alhassan Mohammed Jaguri	172	0.34	
