= Akwasi Konadu =

Ghanaian politician

Hon. Akwasi Konadu
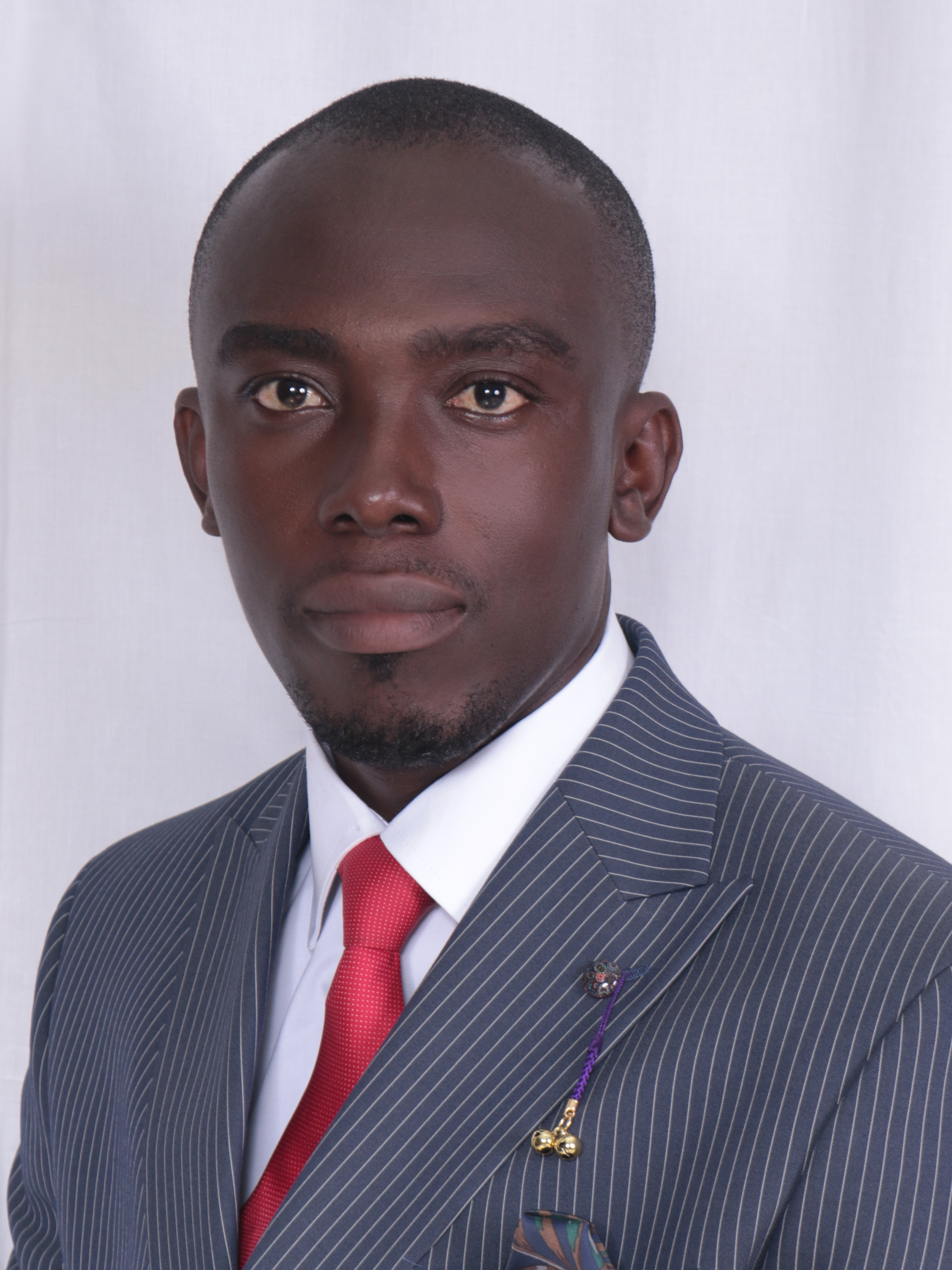

Member of Parliament for Manhyia North Constituency, Director for Ghana Water Company Limited
- Incumbent
- Assumed office 7 January 2021

Personal details
- Born: Akwasi Konadu; 25 July 1982 (age 43) Paakoso, Ghana
- Party: New Patriotic Party
- Occupation: Politician
- Profession: Operations Manager
- Committees: Poverty Reduction Strategy committee; Health Committee

Akwasi Konadu is a Ghanaian politician who is a member of the New Patriotic Party (NPP). He is the member of parliament for the Manhyia North Constituency in the Ashanti Region of Ghana. He is currently the Director at the Ghana Water Company Limited.

== Early life and education ==
Konadu was born on 25 July 1982 and hails from Paakoso in the Ashanti Region. He had his secondary education at Opoku Ware Secondary School. He had his Diploma in Education from the University of Education - Winneba. He further had his bachelor's degree in Sociology with Philosophy in 2005 from the University of Ghana. He also had his master's degree in Development Policy and Planning from KNUST.

== Career ==
Konadu was the Assistant Auditor for KDA Accounting Services in Kumasi. He was also the Project supervising officer for Bonsafo Barwuah Foundation. He was the Operations manager for Greenfield Company Limited.

== Politics ==
Konadu entered the race for the parliamentary candidate in the NPP primaries in the Manhyia North Constituency ahead of the 2020 elections. He unseated the incumbent member of parliament Collins Owusu Amankwah, who had served in parliament for two terms since January 2013, in a tight contest in June 2020 to become the candidate for the party to represent for the Manhyia North Constituency in the 2020 elections. He won after polling 278 votes whilst the incumbent had 273 votes beating him by 5 votes. Prior to the win Konadu had contest in both the 2012 primaries and 2016 primaries against Collins Owusu Amankwaah and lost on both occasions.

Konadu was elected member of parliament for Manhyia North in the 2020 December parliamentary elections. He was declared winner in the parliamentary elections after securing 39,562 votes representing 69.9% against his closest contender the National Democratic Congress' candidate, Hamza Swallah had 15,943 votes representing 28.2%.

=== Committees ===
Konadu is a member of the Poverty Reduction Strategy Committee and also a member of the Health Committee.

== Personal life ==
Konadu is a Christian.
