= Nana Agyei Baffour Awuah =

Ghanaian lawyer and politician

Hon. Nana Agyei Baffour Awuah MP

Member of the Ghana Parliament for Manhyia South
- Incumbent
- Assumed office 7 January 2025
- Preceded by: Matthew Opoku Prempeh

Personal details
- Born: 27 July 1982 (age 44) Ashanti Region, Ghana
- Party: New Patriotic Party
- Education: Lincoln's Inn; Kwame Nkrumah University of Science and Technology
- Occupation: Politician
- Profession: Lawyer

Nana Agyei Baffour Awuah (born July 27, 1982) is a Ghanaian lawyer and politician currently serving as the Member of Parliament for the Manhyia South Constituency in the Ashanti Region. He was elected in the 2024 general elections on the ticket of the New Patriotic Party (NPP), succeeding former MP and Energy Minister Matthew Opoku Prempeh.

== Early life and education ==
Baffour Awuah was born in Achiase, a town in the Ashanti Region of Ghana. He attended the Kwame Nkrumah University of Science and Technology and later studied law in the United Kingdom, where he was called to the Bar at Lincoln's Inn.

== Career ==
Baffour Awuah worked as a legal practitioner and was the Senior Partner at Sarkodie Baffour Awuah and Partners, a law firm based in Accra

=== Politics ===
He contested and won the NPP primaries for Manhyia South in July 2024, securing 71% of the votes. In the December 2024 general elections, he was elected Member of Parliament with approximately 76.2% of the valid votes cast.
