= Tafo =

Town in Ashanti Region, Ghana

Coordinates: 6°44′9″N 1°36′29″W

Tafo Tafo(der)
- Town
- Location in Ghana
- Country: Ghana
- Region: Ashanti Region
- District: Kumasi Metropolitan Assembly

Population (2012)
  - Total: 60,919
- Ranked 30th in Ghana
- Time zone: GMT
  - Summer (DST): GMT

Tafo is a town in Kumasi Metropolitan District in the Ashanti Region of Ghana near the regional capital Kumasi. Tafo is the thirtieth most populous settlement in Ghana, in terms of population, with a population of 60,919 people. Because of the town's population and housing development in recent years, it is debatable whether Tafo is still regarded as a separate town, or already a suburb of Kumasi, the capital of the Ashanti region. The town is near Kumasi, with a distance of approximately 3.3 kilometers to the center of a similar name sounding village named New Tafo and must be distinguished from Tafo (However per traditional/kingship administrative system new Tafo and Old Tafo are basically run by a single Chief who happens to be the leader of the left wing of Kumasi Traditional council. Its therefore under same authority but political administration runs them separately. Nana Tafohene is the Chief of both Tafo which comprises the two). Tarkwa is located just 4.6 km away from Tafo. The city center of Kumasi is located approximately 9.8 kilometers away. Tafo is one of the urban constituencies of the Kumasi Metropolitan Assembly. The town's parliamentary candidate shall have one direct seat to the Parliament of Ghana.

== History ==
Tafo is the headquarters of an Ashanti King, the Tafohene. Historically it was a stop on an important trade route linking Begho and the Niger river valley to the coast, before eventually being supplanted by nearby Kumasi.

An important Cocoa Research Institute was opened in June 1938 at Tafo. At one point the institute had 1,000 employees. Now it only has about 200 employees who perform essentially research and monitoring activities in the area of cocoa cultivation. On test fields in the laboratory and the biological control, African locust are tested and developed with specific pathogens.

In the census of 18 March 1983, there was 25,688 people living in Tafo. A population estimation for January 2007 indicated 53,165 inhabitants.

== Healthcare ==
Tafo Hospital, a major hospital in Tafo, is the health care institution of the local population and plays a major role in the overall well-being of the Town's population.

== Weather ==
In Tafo, so far, the lowest temperature was measured at 12 °C, which is also the lowest temperature registered in Kumasi and Ghana.

== See also ==
- Railway stations in Ghana
