= Gyinyase =

Community in Ashanti Region, Ghana

Gyinyase Atonsu Gyinyase
- Town
- Location of Gyinyase in Ashanti Region
- Coordinates: 06°39′39.35″N 01°34′28.63″W
- Country: Ghana
- Region: Ashanti Region
- District: Asokwa Municipal District
- Time zone: UTC0 (GMT)

Gyinyase (also known as Atonsu Gyinyase) is a community located near Atonsu in the Asokwa Municipality in Ashanti Region of Ghana.

== Notable natives ==
- Collins Owusu Amankwah
