= Daniel Okyem Aboagye =

Ghanaian politician (1973–2023)

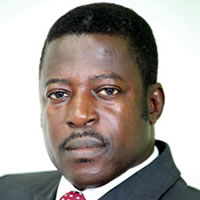

Member of the Ghana Parliament for Bantama Constituency
- Preceded by: Henry Kwabena Kokofu
- Succeeded by: Francis Asenso-Boakye
- Majority: Yes

Personal details
- Born: 31 December 1973 Atwima Boko, Ghana
- Died: 23 September 2023 (aged 49) Kumasi, Ashanti Region, Ghana
- Party: New Patriotic Party
- Education: Troy University

Daniel Okyem Aboagye (31 December 1973 – 23 September 2023) was a Ghanaian politician who was a member of the Seventh Parliament of the Fourth Republic of Ghana, representing the Bantama Constituency in the Ashanti Region on the ticket of the New Patriotic Party.

== Early life and education ==
Okyem Aboagye was born in Atwima Boko in the Ashanti Region of Ghana on 31 December 1973.

Aboagye studied at the University of Ghana where he received a bachelor's degree in Business Administration. He graduated in 2002 with an MBA and MIS in Accounting from Troy University, Alabama, USA. Okyem Aboagye was certified in 2003 as a public accountant at the Certified Public Accountant of USA.

== Career ==
Aboagye started his career as the branch manager of SINAPI ABA TRUST in 1998. He later became the project manager of Opportunity International in 2003–2006. Okyem Aboagye was the financial controller of Globe Union in the US and CEO of MGI Microfinance in 2008–2012. He was the CEO of 2M Express Transport Services.

== Politics ==
In 2015 he contested and won the NPP parliamentary primaries for Bantama (Ghana parliament constituency) in the Ashanti Region of Ghana. He won this parliamentary seat during the 2016 Ghanaian general elections. In June 2020, he lost the bid to represent the New Patriotic Party after losing in the primaries to Francis Asenso-Boakye, who is now the member of parliament for the Bantama (Ghana parliament constituency).

=== Committees ===
Aboagye served as a member of the Finance and Economic Committee in the Seventh Parliament of the Fourth Republic of Ghana.

== Personal life and death ==
Aboagye was married with children.

Okyem Aboagye died at the Komfo Anokye Teaching Hospital on 23 September 2023, at the age of 49.
