= GIHOC Distilleries =

Ghanaian distillery company

GIHOC Distilleries Company Limited is a state-owned Ghanaian distillery company, established in 1958 by the pre-independence Industrial Development Corporation (IDC) as the State Distilleries Corporation. It was the first modern distillery in West Africa. In 1968, it became part of the Ghana Industrial Holding Corporation (GIHOC), and in 1993, it was restructured into a limited liability company wholly owned by the Government of Ghana.

As of February 2025, the Acting Chief Executive Officer of GIHOC Distilleries Company Limited is Jones Borteye Applerh, appointed following the dismissal of the former managing director, Maxwell Kofi Jumah.

== History ==
GIHOC Distilleries was established in 1958 as part of Ghana's early industrialization strategy. It initially operated as the State Distilleries Corporation under the Industrial Development Corporation (IDC).

In 1968, it was absorbed into the newly created Ghana Industrial Holding Corporation (GIHOC), and in 1993 it became a limited liability company, maintaining 100% government ownership.

== Management ==
In January 2025, President John Dramani Mahama removed then-Managing Director Maxwell Kofi Jumah from office following internal investigations and public controversy. Jumah was later arrested and questioned by the Ghana Police CID for alleged misappropriation of company assets and unauthorized sale of vehicles belonging to GIHOC.

Jones Borteye Applerh was appointed Acting CEO in February 2025 to oversee reforms and modernization of the company.

== Operations ==
GIHOC operates across all 16 regions of Ghana and has expanded its distribution reach into Liberia, Nigeria, and Ivory Coast. The company produces a wide range of alcoholic beverages including gin, bitters, brandy, and liqueurs. Some notable brands include Castle Bridge Gin, Mandingo Bitters, Herb Afrik, and Chevalier Brandy.

In 2025, the Government of Ghana announced plans to revamp GIHOC through modernization of its machinery, infrastructure, and export-oriented operations under the African Continental Free Trade Area (AfCFTA) program.

== Controversy ==
In mid-2025, GIHOC filed a complaint against former Managing Director Maxwell Kofi Jumah for allegedly transferring company vehicles without authorization. Police recovered three GIHOC-owned vehicles from his possession.

In April 2026, Jumah was arrested by the Economic and Organised Crime Office. This was reported as part of an ongoing investigation into alleged financial irregularities.
