= Bantama (Ghana parliament constituency) =

Constituency in the Ashanti Region of Ghana

- constituency for the Parliament of Ghana
- District: Kumasi Metropolitan District
- Region: Ashanti Region of Ghana

Current constituency
- Party: New Patriotic Party
- MP: Francis Asenso-Boakye

Bantama is one of the constituencies represented in the Parliament of Ghana. It elects one Member of Parliament (MP) by the first past the post system of election. Bantama is located in the Kumasi Metropolitan district of the Ashanti Region of Ghana.

== Boundaries ==
The seat is located within the Kumasi Metropolitan District of the Ashanti Region of Ghana.

== Members of Parliament ==
First elected	Member	Party	Ref
1969	Horace Walter Kofi-Sackey	Progress Party	
1992	Jibreel Ofori Owusu	National Democratic Congress	
1996	Richard Winfred Anane	New Patriotic Party	
2004	Cecilia Abena Dapaah	New Patriotic Party	
2012	Henry Kwabena Kokofu	New Patriotic Party	
2016	Daniel Okyem Aboagye	New Patriotic Party	
2020	Francis Asenso-Boakye	New Patriotic Party	

== Elections ==
2008 Ghanaian parliamentary election: Bantama Source: Ghana Home Page
Party	Candidate	Votes	%	±%
New Patriotic Party	Cecilia Abena Dapaah	36,708	75.7	—
Independent	Nana Osei Akoto-Kuffour	7,007	14.5	—
National Democratic Congress	Osei-Tutu Richard	2,667	5.5	—
Reformed Patriotic Democrats	Eunice Owusu-Ansah	1,641	3.4	—
Independent	Stephen Kwaku Saahene	443	0.9	—
Majority		29,701	61.2	—
Turnout				

== See also ==
- List of Ghana Parliament constituencies
