= Francis Asenso-Boakye =

Ghanaian politician

Hon. Francis Asenso-Boakye MP
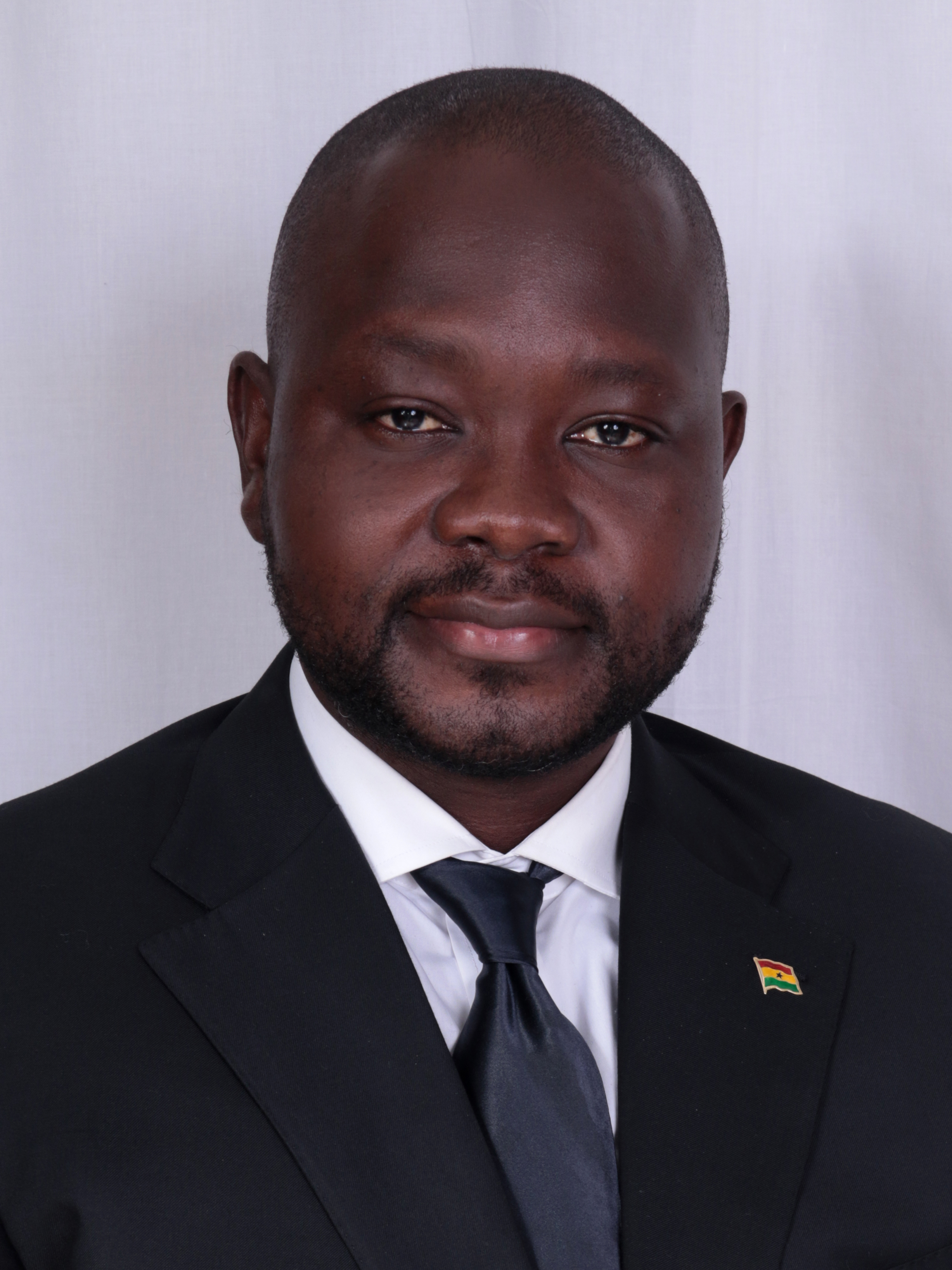

Member of Ghana Parliament for Bantama Constituency
- Incumbent
- Assumed office 7 January 2021
- President: Nana Addo Dankwa Akufo-Addo
- Preceded by: Daniel Okyem Aboagye

Personal details
- Born: 24 September 1977 (age 49) Maase, Ghana
- Party: New Patriotic Party
- Children: Three
- Education: Kwame Nkrumah University of Science and Technology (KNUST); Michigan State University
- Occupation: Politician
- Profession: Businessman
- Committees: Government Assurance Committee; Lands and Forestry Committee

Francis Asenso-Boakye (born 24 September 1977) is a Ghanaian politician and businessman. He is a member of the New Patriotic Party. He is the member of parliament for the Bantama Constituency in the Ashanti Region of Ghana. He was the deputy Chief of Staff and Political Assistant to Nana Addo Dankwa Akufo-Addo; President of the Republic of Ghana. He last served as Minister for Roads and Highways under that government.

== Early life and education ==
He was born on 24 September 1977 and hails from Maase in the Ashanti Region of Ghana. Prior to joining mainstream politics, he was a student activist of the New Patriotic Party who played a key role in the formation of the tertiary students’ wing of the party, the Tertiary Students Confederacy Network (TESCON). He served as its Founding President while pursuing his undergraduate studies at the Kwame Nkrumah University of Science and Technology (KNUST). Prior to his tertiary education, Francis Asenso-Boakye completed his 'O' and 'A' levels at Osei Kyeretwie Secondary School and Tweneboa Kodua Secondary School, both located in the Ashanti Region of Ghana. Asenso-Boakye after completing a degree program at the Kwame Nkrumah University of Science and Technology, pursued a master's degree in Public Policy and Administration as a Rotary Scholar at the Michigan State University, Michigan, USA. In addition to his educational qualifications, he holds a Certificate in Public Sector Management from Tulane University, Louisiana, USA.

== Career ==
Prior to joining the staff and campaign of Nana Addo Dankwa Akufo-Addo, Asenso-Boakye had worked at the Ministry of Employment and Social Welfare, Global Media Alliance, Delta Acquisitions and Development, Delaware, USA, Michigan House of Representatives, Michigan, USA, been a planning officer at Ghana Free Zones Board, a project manager for the Tema Export Processing Zone and a research analyst at the Ghana Investment Promotion Center.

He worked at the Ministry of Employment and Social Welfare on a program to eliminate child labour in cocoa-growing communities in Ghana.

Asenso-Boakye has been a policy and research associate in the Office of State Representative and for the Michigan Legislative Black Caucus, Michigan House of Representatives, USA, where his work focused on policy and legislative issues affecting the interests of African American and minority communities.

On his return to Ghana, Asenso-Boakye worked for the then NPP Presidential Candidate and current president of the Republic of Ghana, Nana Addo Dankwa Akufo-Addo, as political assistant, a position he held until elected into office as a member of parliament.

== Political life ==
In January 2017, Francis Asenso-Boakye was appointed the political assistant and Deputy Chief of Staff at the Flagstaff House by President Nana Addo Dankwa Akufo-Addo. In June 2020, Asenso-Boakye won the Bantama NPP primaries against the incumbent Daniel Okyem Aboagye in a bid to contest for a seat in the Parliament of Ghana. In the 2020 General Elections, he polled 88.84% of total votes cast to emerge as the parliamentary representative of Bantama (Ghana parliament constituency).He served as the Minister for Ministry of Works and Housing (Ghana) before being appointed as the Minister of Roads and Highways.

In 2025,as a ranking member in parliament,he publicly urged prioritizing the dualisation and completion of the critical Accra-Kumasi and Accra-Takoradi highway projects to enhance national trade corridors.

He has also advocated for the design optimisations on public pedestrian footbridges,including adding ramps and lighting,to address high pedestrian road safety risks.

=== Committees ===
Asenso-Boakye is a member of Government Assurance Committee and also a member of Lands and Forestry Committee.

== Personal life ==
Asenso-Boakye is married with three children. He is a Christian.

Political offices
Preceded by	Head of Operations; Ghana; 2017 –	Incumbent
