= Mpasatia =

- Country: Ghana
- Region: Ashanti Region

Mpasatia is a town in the Ashanti Region of Ghana. The town is known for the Mpasatia Secondary Technical School.The town is about fourteen miles from Kumasi. Mpasatia is in the Atwima Mponua District in Ashanti Region.The town has three Junior High Schools and one Senior High School. The main occupation in this town is farming. It is also one of the mining towns in Atwima Mponua District. The total population of the town is about 4000. It is the second largest town in Atwima Mponua District.it is a flat land surrounded by two rivers. That is river Waawe and River Asuo Kofi. Some of the surrounding villages are Yawbour, Seseko, Kwapaa, Bedifi and Amaadu Nkwanta. The town is divided into four areas, that is Ahenbronum, Amangoase, Carbery and Atenesu.

== Notable people ==
The town has produced prominent people including:

- Cecilia Dapaah — former MP for Bantama and minister under the Nana Akufo-Addo administration
- Gabriel Opoku-Asare, a top corporate executive and government official. https://citinewsroom.com/2025/05/mahama-brings-former-diageo-leader-on-board-presidential-committee-on-accelerated-export-devt
