= Collins Owusu Amankwah =

Ghanaian politician

Member of the Ghana Parliament for Manhyia North Constituency
- Incumbent
- Assumed office 7 January 2017
- Preceded by: New constituency

Personal details
- Born: August 21, 1980 (age 46)
- Party: New Patriotic Party
- Education: Kumasi High School; University of Ghana

Collins Owusu Amankwah is a Ghanaian politician and member of the Seventh Parliament of the Fourth Republic of Ghana representing the Manhyia North Constituency in the Ashanti Region on the ticket of the New Patriotic Party.

== Early life and education ==
Collins was born on 21 August 1980 and hails from Gyinyase in the Ashanti Region. He had his Bachelor of Arts degree in sociology from University of Ghana, Legon and also had his LLB from GIMPA. He is an old student of Kumasi High School.

== Career ==
Collins worked as the General Manager for All Friends FM (94.5 MHz), Kumasi from 2011 to 2013 before going into Parliament. He was also a scale manager at Jakwapo Express Limited from 2002 to 2004. He was also the Executive Director for Clean City Initiative from 2008 to 2018.

== Political career ==
He is a member of the NPP. He was voted into Parliament for the first time in 2013 after the completion of the 2012 Ghanaian General Election. After serving his four years term, he was re-elected again after defeating his opposition with a dominating percentage of 71.80% of the total valid vote, his political went down after the election in january 2024.

== Personal life ==
Collins is a Christian. He is married with two children.
