= Henry Kwabena Kokofu =

Ghanaian politician

Member of the Ghana Parliament for Bantama Constituency
- In office 7 January 2013 – 6 January 2017
- Preceded by: Cecilia Abena Dapaah
- Succeeded by: Daniel Okyem Aboagye

Personal details
- Born: October 5, 1960 (age 65)
- Party: New Patriotic Party
- Education: Kwame Nkrumah University of Science and Technology

Henry Kwabena Kokofu (born 5 October 1960) is a Ghanaian politician and was a member of the Sixth Parliament of the Fourth Republic of Ghana representing the Bantama Constituency in the Bantama on the ticket of the New Patriotic Party.

== Personal life ==
Kokofu identifies as a Christian. He is married.

== Early life and education ==
Kokofu was born on 5 October 1960. He hails from Adiebeba-Kumasi, a town in the Ashanti Region of Ghana. He attended the Kwame Nkrumah University of Science and Technology and obtained his Bachelor of Science degree in Natural Resource Management in 1971. In 2007, he acquired a Master of Science degree in Agroforestry from the same university. He also attended Ghana School of Law and obtained his Bachelor of Laws degree in law. He is an old student of Kumasi high school.

== Politics ==
Kokofu is a member of the New Patriotic Party (NPP). In 2012, he contested for the Bantama (Ghana parliament constituency) seat on the ticket of the NPP sixth parliament of the fourth republic and won. During the elections he garnered 49,054 votes, which represented 83.26% of the total valid votes cast, and hence defeated the other contestants including Samuel Yaw Adusei, Benjamin Owusu-Achaw, Jerry F. Akonnor, Nana Kwasi Abayie, Regina Serwaa Adjei and Samuel Appiah. He did not contest in the 2016 Ghanaian general elections; instead, Daniel Okyem Aboagye represented the New Patriotic Party and won. As a result, Kokofu served as the member of parliament for Bantama (Ghana parliament constituency) till 6 January 2017.
