= Suame Municipal District =

Municipal district in Ashanti region, Ghana

- Municipal District
- Districts of Ashanti Region

- Location of Suame Municipal District within Ashanti
- Coordinates: 6°43′N 1°39′W
- Country: Ghana
- Region: Ashanti
- Capital: Suame

Population (2021)
  - Total: 136,290
- Time zone: UTC+0 (GMT)

Suame Municipal District is one of the forty-three districts in Ashanti Region, Ghana. Originally it was a sub-metropolitan district council within the Kumasi Metropolitan Assembly until 15 March 2018, when it was elevated to municipal district assembly status to become Suame Municipal District. The municipality is located in the central part of Ashanti Region and has Suame as its capital town.
