= Asokwa Municipal District =

- Municipal District
- Districts of Ashanti Region

- Location of Asokwa Municipal District within Ashanti
- Coordinates: 6°40′N 1°35′W
- Country: Ghana
- Region: Ashanti
- Capital: Asokwa

Area
  - Total: 25.31 km^{2} (9.77 sq mi)

Population (2021)
  - Total: 125,642
  - Density: 4,964/km^{2} (12,860/sq mi)
- Time zone: UTC+0 (GMT)

Asokwa Municipal District is one of the forty-three districts in Ashanti Region, Ghana. Originally it was a sub-metropolitan district council within the Kumasi Metropolitan Assembly until 15 March 2018, when it was elevated to municipal district assembly status to become Asokwa Municipal District. The municipality is located in the central part of Ashanti Region and has Asokwa as its capital town.

In 2018, March 18 the district was inaugurated. It recorded a total population of 125,642 during the 2021 population and housing census with 61,000 males and 64,642 females.
