= Ghana National Energy Transition Framework =

National strategy developed by the Government of Ghana

The National Energy Transition Framework is a national strategy developed by the Government of Ghana through the Ministry of Energy to guide the country's transition from primarily fossil-fuel based energy towards a low-carbon, sustainable energy system. The framework was launched in 2022 and forms part of Ghana's broader climate, energy policy and development agenda, aligning with international climate commitments and the National Energy Transition Plan (2022–2070)

It was projected that the implementation of the framework would lead to a reduction of electricity tariffs to below 4.5 cents per kilowatt hour.

== Objectives ==
According to the National Energy Transition Framework (Abridged Version, 2022), the specific objectives of Ghana's Energy Transition Framework are to:

- Identify viable pathways for the country to transition towards carbon neutrality within a secure and efficient energy sector
- Harness opportunities for a fair and equitable transition, recognizing Ghana's reliance on carbon-intensive industries for economic growth
- Evaluate the potential impacts of the transition on infrastructure, government revenue, employment, and social development
- Develop medium- to long-term targets and policies for achieving a carbon-neutral economy
- Estimate the costs of implementation and identify financing options to support the realization of these objectives.
