= Mustapha Ussif =

Ghanaian politician

Hon. Mustapha Ussif
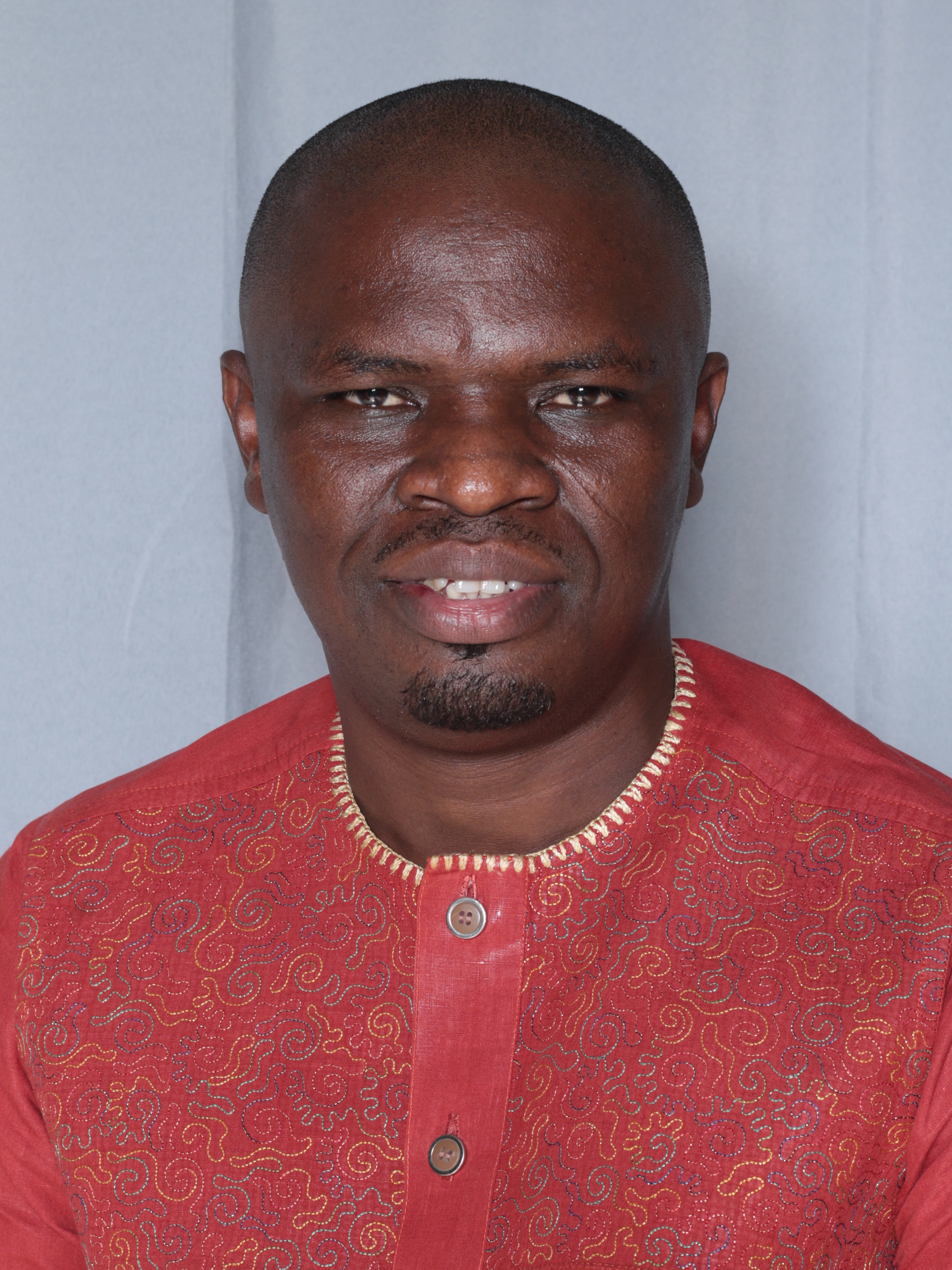

Minister of Youth and Sports
- In office 5 March 2021 – 6 January 2025
- Preceded by: Isaac Kwame Asiamah
- Succeeded by: Kofi Adams

Member of Ghana parliament for Yagaba-Kubori constituency
- Incumbent
- Assumed office 7 January 2021
- Preceded by: Abdul-Rauf Tanko Ibrahim

Member of Ghana parliament for Yagaba-Kubori constituency
- In office 7 January 2013 – 6 January 2017
- Preceded by: Abdul-Rauf Tanko Ibrahim
- Succeeded by: Abdul-Rauf Tanko Ibrahim

Personal details
- Born: 16 August 1979 (age 47) Ghana
- Party: New Patriotic Party
- Education: Bagabaga Teacher Training College; Anglia Ruskin University; University of Gloucestershire

Mustapha Ussif (born 16 August 1979) is a Ghanaian politician. He is a member of the New Patriotic Party(NPP) and a member of the 8th parliament of the 4th Republic of Ghana representing the Yagaba-Kubori Constituency in the North East Region of Ghana. On 21 January 2021, he was nominated by Nana Akufo-Addo to serve as Minister of Youth and Sports.

== Early life and education ==
Ussif was born on 16 August 1979. He hails from Tantaala in the Northern Region of Ghana. He studied at Bagabaga Teacher Training College(BATCO) and Anglia Ruskin University where he obtained his Bachelor of Arts degree in International Business and Management in 2010. He continued at the University of Gloucestershire where he graduated in 2011 with a master's degree in Finance and Investment.

== Career ==
Ussif worked as an Investment Analyst at Ray and Associates, UK in 2010. That same year, he joined Action Aid UK where he worked as a Freelance Consultant.

== Politics ==
=== Member of Parliament ===
Ussif entered parliament on 7 January 2013 on the ticket of the New Patriotic Party after defeating the incumbent member of parliament Abdul-Rauf Tanko Ibrahim. He represented the Yagaba-Kubori Constituency from 2013 to 2017 in the 6th parliament but subsequently lost in his bid to be reelected into the 7th parliament to his previous opponent Abdul-Rauf Tanko Ibrahim of the National Democratic Congress during the 2016 Ghanaian general election. In that 6th parliament, he served on the Mines and Energy Committee, and the Standing Orders Committee.

He stood for the NPP's parliamentary primaries unopposed and was declared the person to represent the party in the 2020 December elections. He beat the incumbent member of parliament Abdul-Rauf Tanko Ibrahim who he had faced on two occasions in the past elections. He won with 18,153 votes representing 64.01% whilst his opponent had 9,393 votes representing 33.14%

=== Executive Director of NSS ===
In 2017, He was appointed to serve as the executive director of the National Service Scheme by president, Nana Akufo-Addo during the first term of his government.

=== Minister of Youth and Sports ===
After winning back the Yagaba-Kubori Constituency seat in 2020, Ussif was nominated on 21 January 2021 by President Nana Akufo-Addo to serve as Minister of Youth and Sports during his second term. After going through vetting in Parliament of Ghana and passing he was sworn into office on 5 March 2021 along with 27 other minister-designates at the Jubilee House, Accra.

== Personal life ==
Ussif is married with two children. He identifies as a Muslim.
