= Richard Ofori Agyemang Boadi =

Ghanaian politician

Richard Ofori Agyemang Boadi is a Ghanaian politician and administrator. He currently serves as the Metropolitan Chief Executive (MCE) of the Kumasi Metropolitan Assembly (KMA), effectively acting as the Mayor of Kumasi. His appointment was confirmed in April 2025 after being nominated by President John Dramani Mahama.

== Early life and education ==
Richard Ofori Agyemang Boadi hails from the Ashanti Region of Ghana. He began his early education at Amankwatia Salvation Army KG and Primary School. He continued at Kokote M/A Junior High School and later attended Dwamena Akenten Senior High School.

== Career ==
Before his appointment in Kumasi, Boadi served as the Municipal Chief Executive (MCE) for the Obuasi Municipal Assembly. During his tenure, he was involved in various development programs including sanitation initiatives and youth-oriented projects. In April 2025, Boadi was nominated by President John Dramani Mahama as MCE for the Kumasi Metropolitan Assembly. He was confirmed by the Assembly with 55 votes out of 56. As Mayor, he initiated city management reforms, including decongestion exercises and market redevelopment projects such as Kejetia Market Phase II and Krofrom Market.
