= Manhyia South =

Constituency in the Ashanti Region of Ghana

- constituency for the Parliament of Ghana
- District: Kumasi Metropolitan District
- Region: Ashanti Region of Ghana

Current constituency
- Party: New Patriotic Party
- MP: Nana Agyei Baffour Awuah

Manhyia South is one of the constituencies represented in the Parliament of Ghana. It elects one Member of Parliament (MP) by the first past the post system of election. Nana Agyei Baffour Awuah is the member of parliament for the constituency. Manhyia South is located in the Kumasi Metropolitan district of the Ashanti Region of Ghana.

== Boundaries ==
The seat is located within the Kumasi Metropolitan District of the Ashanti Region of Ghana. The constituency is engulfed by Asawase, Manhyia North, Bantama and Subin constituencies

== Members of Parliament ==
Election	Member	Party
1997	Dr Kwame Addo Kufuor	New Patriotic Party
2001	Dr Kwame Addo Kufuor	New Patriotic Party
2005	Dr Kwame Addo Kufuor	New Patriotic Party
2009	Dr Matthew Opoku Prempeh	New Patriotic Party
2013	Dr Matthew Opoku Prempeh	New Patriotic Party
2017	Dr Matthew Opoku Prempeh	New Patriotic Party
2021	Dr Matthew Opoku Prempeh	New Patriotic Party
2025	Nana Agyei Baffour Awuah, Esq.	New Patriotic Party

== Elections ==
2016 Ghanaian parliamentary election: Manhyia South Source:Peace FM Online
Party	Candidate	Votes	%	±%
New Patriotic Party	Mathew Opoku Prempeh	35,958	86.17	
National Democratic Congress	Sylvester Lewis Kofie	5,043	12.08	
Progressive People's Party	Boadu Richard	519	1.24	
Convention People's Party	Asante Eugene	210	0.50	
Majority		30,915	74.09	

2012 Ghanaian parliamentary election: Manhyia South Source:Peace FM Online
Party	Candidate	Votes	%	±%
New Patriotic Party	Mathew Opoku Prempeh	35,152	82.05	
National Democratic Congress	Mohammed Kamaldeen Yakubu	6,890	16.08	
United Front Party	Daniel Oppong	515	1.20	
Convention People's Party	Yaw Nkunim	189	0.44	
National Democratic Party	Gabriel Kofi Owiredu	97	0.23	
Majority		28,262	65.97	

== See also ==
- List of Ghana Parliament constituencies
