= Matthew Opoku Prempeh =

Ghanaian politician and medical doctor

Hon. Dr, Matthew Opoku Prempeh
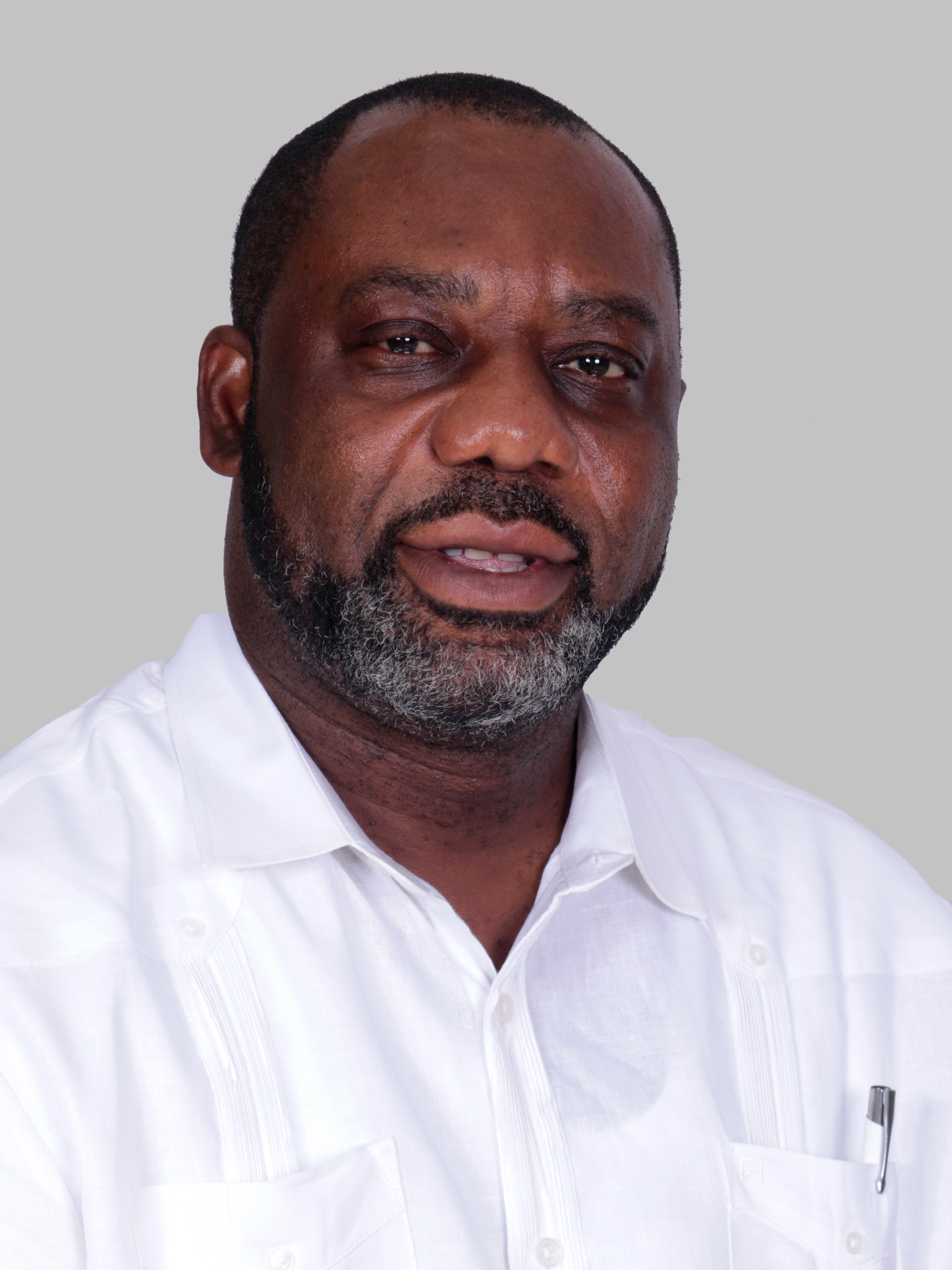
- Opoku Prempeh in 2021

Former Member of Parliament for Manhyia South Constituency
- In office 7 January 2009 – 7 January 2025
- Succeeded by: Nana Agyei Baffour Awuah

Minister of Energy
- Incumbent
- Assumed office 7 January 2021 - 2024
- Preceded by: John Peter Amewu

Minister of Education
- In office 10 January 2017 – 6 January 2021

Personal details
- Born: Matthew Opoku Prempeh; 23 May 1968 (age 58) Pakyi No 2, Ghana
- Party: New Patriotic Party
- Education: Prempeh College; Kwame Nkrumah University of Science and Technology
- Occupation: Politician
- Profession: Medical doctor
- Committees: Defense and Interior Committee; Appointments Committee

Matthew Opoku Prempeh (born 23 May 1968) is a Ghanaian medical doctor and politician. He was the vice presidential candidate of the New Patriotic Party for the 2024 Presidential and Parliamentary elections. He is a former Member of Parliament for the Manhyia South Constituency and a former Minister of Education in Ghana. He is popularly known as NAPO, an acronym for his traditional name, Nana Poku. He also served as the Minister of Energy from 2021 to 2024.

== Early life and education ==
Matthew Opoku Prempeh was born on 23 May 1968 in Ashanti New Town, a suburb of Kumasi, and hails from Pakyi No. 2 in the Ashanti Region. Born to Oheneba Kwame Kyeretwie and Madam Elizabeth Akosua Nyarko, NAPO’s father was one of the many sons of the 14th Asantehene, Otumfuo Agyemang Prempeh II.

He started his basic education at KNUST Primary and continued to Prempeh College in Kumasi, Ashanti Region of Ghana, for his middle school education.

He studied Human Biology and Medicine at Kwame Nkrumah University of Science and Technology (KNUST) and completed his MB CHB in 1994. He continued with post-graduate studies in MSc. Clinical Epidemiology at the Netherlands Institute of Health Sciences in 1998 and at the Kennedy School of Government at Harvard University where he studied Leadership and Government(certificate course). In 2002, he pursued postgraduate training in surgery in the UK (MRCS).

== Career ==
Prior to entering parliament, Prempeh served as CEO of Keyedmap Security Services Limited from 2004 to 2009. He is also a medical doctor and served as a member of the Royal College of Physicians and Surgeons of the United Kingdom from 1999 to 2003.

== Politics ==
=== Member of parliament ===
As a Member of Parliament, he represented Manhyia South in Kumasi, formerly Manhyia Constituency. He was first elected to parliament in 2008 and got re-elected in 2012. In 2016, he secured a third term in Parliament by obtaining 35,958 votes, or 87.17% of the total valid votes cast in the constituency. Prempeh again contested his seat in the 2020 Ghanaian general election and won by a large margin. Prempeh won his party's internal election to contest the 2024 elections as Parliamentary candidate, but stepped down following his nomination as Vice Presidential Candidate of the NPP by Mahamudu Bawumia. Prempeh is a member of the Defense and Interior Committee and also of the Appointments Committee of Parliament.

=== Minister of Education ===
He was appointed by President Nana Akufo-Addo on 10 January 2017 to serve as Minister for Education in Ghana. He served in that role for 4 years until 6 January 2021 when the tenure of the president and his ministers ended.

In May 2017, President Nana Akufo-Addo named Prempeh as one of the nineteen ministers in his cabinet. The names of the 19 ministers were submitted to Parliament and announced by Speaker, Mike Ocquaye. As a Cabinet minister, Prempeh was part of the inner circle of the president and helped in making key decisions for the country.

Prempeh also contributed to the educational sector of Ghana as a Minister of Education, such as improving the infrastructure, promoting vocational and technical education (TVET), and leading the implementation of the government's free senior high school policy.

=== Minister of Energy ===
After the NPP victory in the 2020 elections, Prempeh was appointed Minister for Energy. He served in this role from 2021 until July 2024 when he resigned to concentrate on campaigning for the general election following his selection as Vice Presidential candidate too Mahamudu Bawumia.

=== 2024 General Elections ===
Dr Mahamudu Bawumia selected Dr. Matthew Opoku Prempeh as his running mate for the 2024 general elections. His appointment as the vice presidential candidate was also endorsed by the National Executive Council (NEC) of the New Patriotic Party (NPP).

== Honours ==
In May 2021, the University of Education Winneba conferred on him an Honorary Doctorate Degree. In July 2021, the University of Professional Studies also awarded him an Honorary Doctor of Humane Letters. The University of Cape Coast is the latest institution to recognize Dr. Prempeh’s contributions to the development of Ghana and his immense service to the University of Cape Coast, Ghana. In May 2022, a group by the name of Friends of NAPO presented some educational materials to schools in the Manhyia South Constituency to mark his 54th birthday. Prempeh College named a dormitory block after him on 17 June 2023.

In November 2024, a newly constructed hostel at the University of Professional Studies, Accra (UPSA) was named after him in recognition of his contributions to education.
