= Asokwa (Ghana parliament constituency) =

Constituency in the Ashanti Region of Ghana

- constituency for the Parliament of Ghana
- District: Kumasi Metropolitan District
- Region: Ashanti Region of Ghana

Current constituency
- Created: 2004
- Party: New Patriotic Party
- MP: Patricia Appiagyei

Asokwa is one of the constituencies represented in the Parliament of Ghana. It elects one Member of Parliament (MP) by the first past the post system of election. Asokwa is located in the Kumasi Metropolitan District of the Ashanti Region of Ghana.

== Boundaries ==
The seat is located within the Kumasi Metropolitan District of the Ashanti Region of Ghana.

== History ==
The constituency was first created in 2004 by the Electoral Commission of Ghana along with 29 other new ones, increasing the number of constituencies from 200 to 230.

== Members of Parliament ==
Election	Member	Party
2004	Constituency created	
2004	Maxwell Kofi Jumah	New Patriotic Party
2008	Maxwell Kofi Jumah	New Patriotic Party
2012	Patricia Appiagyei	New Patriotic Party

== Elections ==
2012 Ghanaian parliamentary election: Asokwa
Party	Candidate	Votes	%	±%
NPP	Patricia Appiagyei	54,904	80.32	
NDC	Charles Kojo Obeng	12,647	18.50	
PPP	Emmanuel Chris Nyamekye	568	0.83	
CPP	Isaac Halifax Bekoe	156	0.23	
NDP	Osei Bonsu William	85	0.12	

2008 Ghanaian parliamentary election: Asokwa
Party	Candidate	Votes	%	±%
New Patriotic Party	Maxwell Kofi Jumah	34,801	62.0	
Independent	Gyimah Akwanuasah	13,665	24.4	
Convention People's Party	Kwaku Baah Bonsu	7,653	13.6	
Majority		21,136	37.6	

== See also ==
- List of Ghana Parliament constituencies
