= Nhyiaeso (Ghana parliament constituency) =

Constituency in the Ashanti Region of Ghana

- constituency for the Parliament of Ghana
- District: Kumasi Metropolitan District
- Region: Ashanti Region of Ghana

Current constituency
- Created: 2004
- Party: New Patriotic Party
- MP: Stephen Amoah

Nhyiaeso is one of the constituencies represented in the Parliament of Ghana. It elects one Member of Parliament (MP) by the first past the post system of election. Nhyiaeso is located in the Kumasi Metropolitan district of the Ashanti Region of Ghana.

This seat was created prior to the Ghanaian parliamentary election in 2004 and has been held by the New Patriotic Party since then.

The Member of Parliament for the Nhyiaeso Constituency is Stephen Amoah since 2017.

== Boundaries ==
The seat is located within the Kumasi Metropolitan District of the Ashanti Region of Ghana.

== History ==
The constituency was first created in 2004 by the Electoral Commission of Ghana along with 29 other new ones, increasing the number of constituencies from 200 to 230.

== Members of Parliament ==
Election	Member	Party
2004	Constituency created	
2004	Richard Winfred Anane	New Patriotic Party
2016	Kennedy Kwasi Kankam	New Patriotic Party
2020	Stephen Amoah	New Patriotic Party

== Elections ==
2004 Ghanaian parliamentary election:Nhyiaeso Source:Ghana Home Page
Party	Candidate	Votes	%	±%
New Patriotic Party	Richard Winfred Anane	36,307	77.9	N/A
National Democratic Congress	Eric Baah-Nuako	8,908	19.1	N/A
Convention People's Party	Kwame Appiah Boateng	1,411	3.0	N/A
Majority		27,399	58.8	N/A

== See also ==
- List of Ghana Parliament constituencies
