= Yagaba-Kubori (Ghana parliament constituency) =

Ghana parliament constituency

- constituency for the Parliament of Ghana
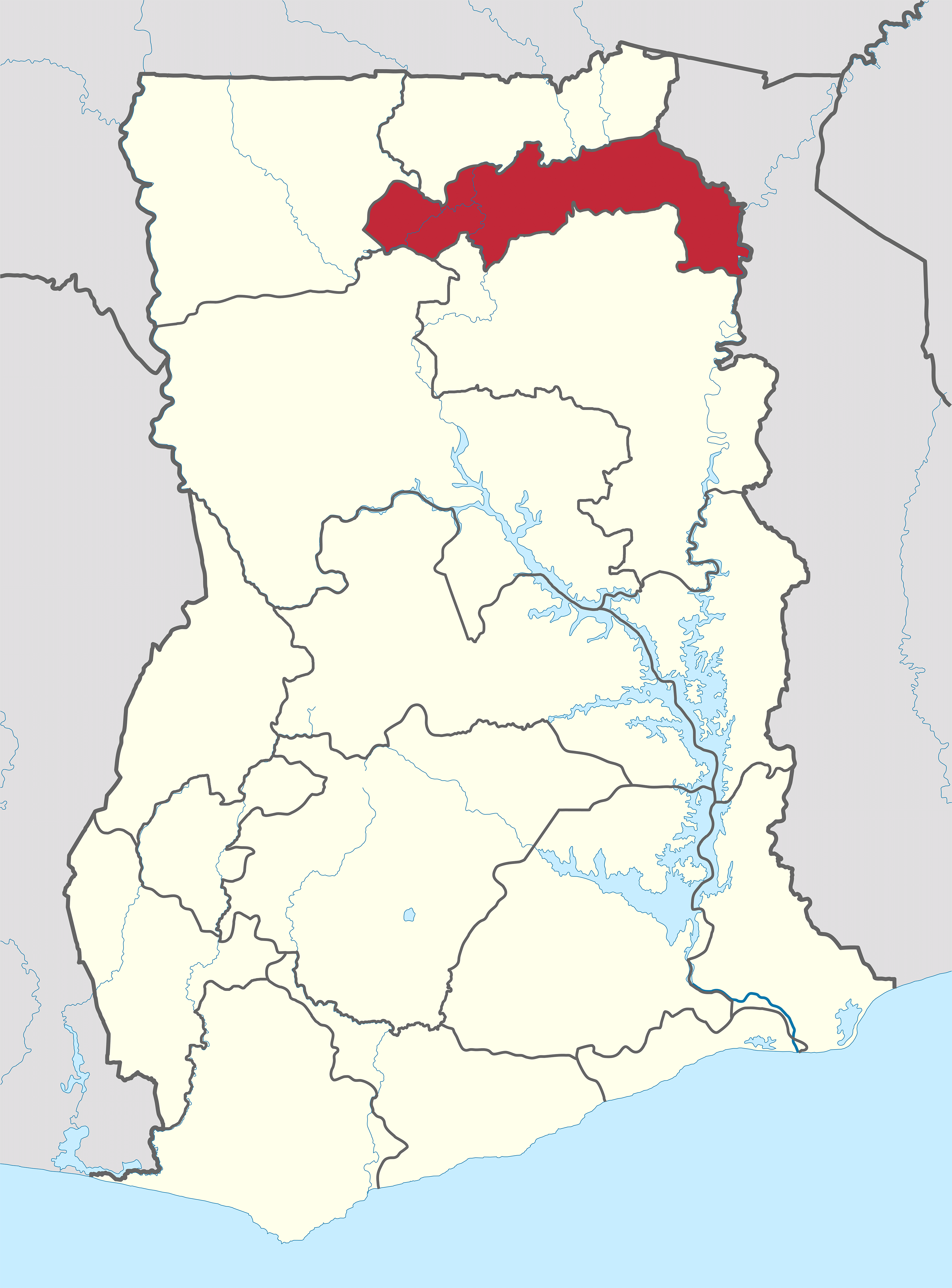
- District: Mamprugu Moaduru
- Region: North East Region of Ghana

Current constituency
- Party: New Patriotic Party
- MP: Mustapha Ussif

Yagaba-Kubori is one of the constituencies represented in the Parliament of Ghana. It elects one Member of Parliament (MP) by the first past the post system of election. Mustapha Ussif is the current member of parliament for the constituency. It is located in the North East Region of Ghana.

He succeeded Abdul-Rauf Tanko Ibrahim. He was elected on the ticket of the National Democratic Congress (NDC) and won a majority of 1,330 votes more than candidate closest in the race, to win the constituency election to become the MP. He had represented the constituency in the 4th Republican parliament on the ticket of the National Democratic Congress.

== See also ==
- List of Ghana Parliament constituencies
