= Richard Winfred Anane =

Ghanaian politician

Hon. Richard Winfred Anane

Member of the Ghana Parliament for Nhyiaeso Constituency
- In office 7 January 2013 – 6 January 2017
- President: John Mahama

Member of Parliament for Nhyiaeso Constituency
- In office 7 January 2009 – 6 January 2013
- President: John Atta Mills; John Mahama

Member of Parliament for Nhyiaeso Constituency
- In office 7 January 2005 – 6 January 2009
- President: John Kufuor

Minister for Health, Minister for Roads and Highways
- In office 2001–2006
- President: John Kufuor

Personal details
- Born: 12 March 1954 (age 72)
- Party: New Patriotic Party
- Children: 4
- Education: Kwame Nkrumah University of Science and Technology
- Profession: Medical Doctor

Richard Winfred Anane (born March 12, 1954) is a physician and former Ghanaian politician who served as Minister for Roads and Highways, Minister for Health, and Member of Parliament for Nhyiaeso serving from 1997 to 2017.

== Early life and education ==
Anane was born on 12 March 1954. He hails from Santasi in the Ashanti Region. He received his high school education at Asanteman Senior High School. In 1983, Anane received an MB CHB from Kwame Nkrumah University of Science and Technology (KNUST) in Kumasi.

== Career ==
Anane was a doctor at Hebron Clinic, Bantama, before he became a Member of Parliament in 1997.

== Political career ==
Anane is a member of the New Patriotic Party. He contested in the 2012 Ghanaian general elections on the ticket of the New Patriotic Party and won. He obtained 36,067 votes out of the 47, 535 valid votes cast, representing 75.9% of the total votes cast in the 2012 election, exemplifying his popularity in his constituency. Anane served in multiple cabinet-level positions under John Agyekum Kufuor, being Minister for Health and Minister for Roads and Highways respectively from 2001 to 2006.

== Elections ==
Anane was elected as the member of parliament for the Nhyiaeso constituency of the Ashanti Region of Ghana in the 2004 Ghanaian general elections. He won on the ticket of the New Patriotic Party. His constituency was a part of the 36 parliamentary seats out of 39 seats won by the New Patriotic Party in that election for the Ashanti Region. The New Patriotic Party won a majority total of 128 parliamentary seats out of 230 seats. He was elected with 36,307 votes out of 46,626 total valid votes cast. This was equivalent to 77.9% of total valid votes cast. He was elected over Eric Baah-Nuako of the National Democratic Congress and Kwame Appiah Boateng of the Convention People's Party. These candidates obtained 8,908 and 1,411 votes respectively of total valid votes cast. These were equivalent to 19.1% and 3% respectively of total valid votes cast.

In 2008, he won the general elections on the ticket of the New Patriotic Party for the same constituency. His constituency was part of the 34 parliamentary seats out of 39 seats won by the New Patriotic Party in that election for the Ashanti Region. The New Patriotic Party won a minority total of 109 parliamentary seats out of 230 seats. He was elected with 36,067 votes out of 47,535 total valid votes cast. This was equivalent to 75.87% of total valid votes cast. He was elected over Joseph Bernard Boadu of the National Democratic Congress, Kwame Appiah Boateng of the Convention People's Party, Kwaku Bonsu of the Reformed Patriotic Democrats and Kwame Owusu an independent candidate. These candidates obtained 9,426, 1,055, 197 and 790 votes respectively of the total valid votes cast. These were equivalent to 19.83%, 2.22%, 0.41% and 1.66% respectively of the total votes cast.

In 2012, he won the general elections on the ticket of the New Patriotic Party for the same constituency. He was elected with 45,389 votes out of 56,558 total valid votes cast. This was equivalent to 76.21% of total valid votes cast. He was elected over Nana Afua Anima of the National Democratic Congress, Yaw Sekyere of the Progressive People's Party, Emmanuel Dapaah of the Convention People's Party and Peter Boakye-Yiadom of the National Democratic Party. These candidates obtained 12,304, 666, 807 and 392 votes respectively of the total valid votes cast. These were equivalent to 20.66%, 1.12%, 1.35% and 0.66% respectively of the total votes cast.

== Personal life ==
Anane is a Roman Catholic. He is married with four children.
