= Bantama =

Coordinates: 6°39′N 1°37′W

- Suburban Area
- Location in Ghana
- Country: Ghana
- Region: Ashanti Region
- District: Kumasi Metropolitan District
- Elevation: 912 ft (278 m)
- Time zone: GMT
  - Summer (DST): GMT

Bantama is suburb of Kumasi. Kumasi is the regional capital of the Ashanti Region of Ghana. Bantama is both a residential and commercial area in the Kumasi Metropolitan Assembly. It is in the center of the regional capital.

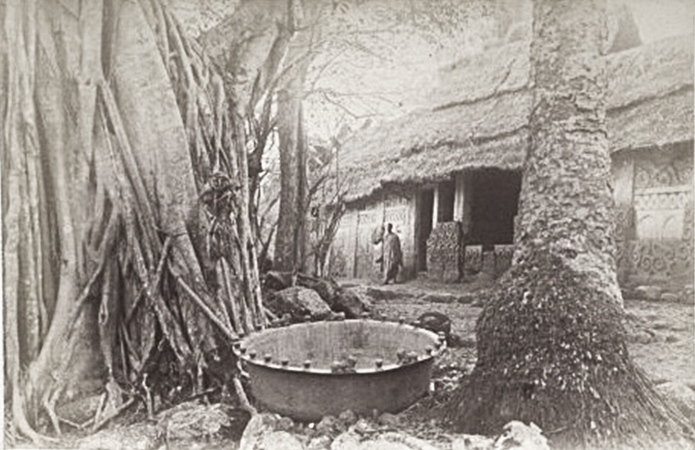
A pre-colonial Ashanti mausoleum at Bantama in the 1870s

== Notable places ==
- Komfo Anokye Teaching Hospital and Nursing Training School.
- Komfo Anokye Sword Museum.
- The Bantama Market Square.
