= Kumasi Metropolitan Assembly =

Metropolitan district in Ashanti region, Ghana

- Metropolitan District
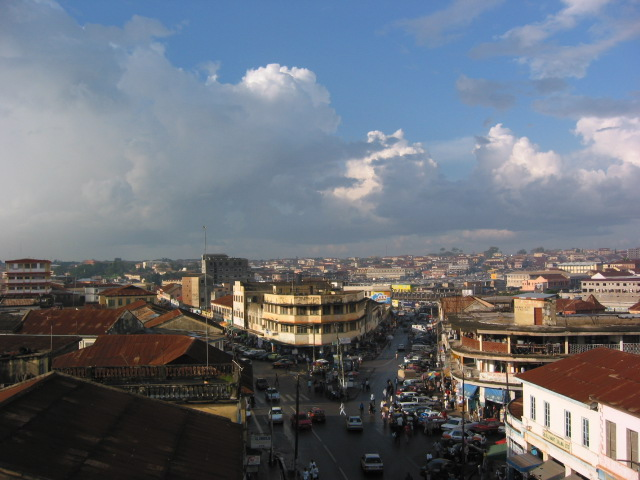
- Aerial view of submetro Nhyiaeso in Kumasi Metropolitan Assembly (Kumasi Metropolis) in 2003

- Flag Seal

- Districts of Ashanti Region

- Location of Kumasi Metropolitan Assembly within Ashanti
- Coordinates: 6°41′N 1°37′W
- Country: Ghana
- Region: Ashanti
- Capital: Kumasi
- Founded: 1680
- Founder: King Asantehene Osei Tutu I
- Seat: Kumasi Metropolis Hall
- Submetros: 9 Submetros: Nhyiaeso; Bantama; Manhyia; Subin

Government
  - Type: Mayor–council absolute monarchy
  - Body: Manhyia Palace - Kumasi Metropolitan Assembly
  - Metropolis Chief Executive: Osei Tutu II
  - City Mayor: Richard Ofori Agyemang Boadi (KMA/NDC)

Area
  - Total: 299 km^{2} (115 sq mi)

Population (2021 Census)
  - Total: 443,981
  - Density: 1,480/km^{2} (3,850/sq mi)
- Time zone: UTC+0 (GMT)
- Website: www.kma.gov.gh

Kumasi Metropolitan Assembly (abbreviated as the KMA) is one of the 261 Metropolitan, Municipal and District Assemblies (MMDAs) in Ghana. It forms part of the forty-three districts in Ashanti Region, Ghana with Kumasi being its administrative capital. The metropolis is located in the central part of Ashanti Region and has Kumasi as its capital city. With a projected population of over two million and an annual growth rate of about 5.4%, it is a rapidly expanding metropolis. The Metropolis is about 254 kilometers long, with a centrally located commercial area and a largely circular physical structure. The fast rate of urbanization is confirmed by estimates that 48%, 46%, and 60% of the Metropolis are rural, peri-urban, and urban, respectively.

== History ==
The city of Kumasi was founded by King Osei Tutu I in the 1680s to serve as the capital of the Asante State .

Due to the location of Kumasi and its dominance in the politics of the Gold coast in the early days, Kumasi evolved into a major commercial hub with all the major trading routes across the country converging within it. Kumasi also came under the British rule in 1890. Kumasi grew with time and eventually evolved to become the second largest city in terms of land area, population size, economic activity and socio-economic lifestyle to Accra the largest in Ghana. The beautiful greenery layout of the city accorded it the accolade of being called the “Garden City of West Africa”

Originally founded in 1680, "Kumasi" later became known as the Kumasi City Council from 1988 until 1995, when it was upgraded into metropolitan assembly status. Evolving around the three communities of Adum, Krobo and Bompata, Kumasi has eventually grown in a concentric form to cover an area of approximately ten (10) kilometers in radius. The direction of growth was originally and initially along the arterial roads due to the accessibility and permeability they offered resulting in a radial pattern of development.

== Location ==
The Kumasi Metropolitan is about 270 km north of the Accra, which is the national capital of Ghana, 120 km south east of Sunyani the capital of the Bono Region and it is located between Latitude 6.35° N and 6.40° S and Longitude 1.30° W and 1.35° E and elevated 250 to 300 meters above sea level. The surface area is approximately 214.3 square kilometers which is about 0.9 percent of the region’s land area.It is located in the transitional forest zone.

== Structure ==
The Kumasi Metropolitan Assembly (KMA) was established by Legislative Instrument 1614 of 1995 under Local Government Law 1988, NDPC law 207, which replaced the Local Government Act 462, 1993. The LI 1614 of 1995 under the under Local Government Law 1988, NDPC law 207 established the Kumasi Metropolitan area and divided it into an initial 4 sub-metropolitan area namely Asokwa, Bantama, Manhyia and Subin.

In 2005, The LI, 1914 was amended as LI 1805, 2005 divided the Metropolitan Assembly into 10 Sub-Metropolitan District Councils namely Asawase, Asokwa, Bantama, Kwadaso, Manhyia, Nhyiaeso, Oforikrom, Suame, Subin and Tafo.

In 2012, Asawase Sub-Metropolitan District Council was carved out from KMA to create the Asokore Mampong Municipal District Assembly through LI 2112. Thus leaving the Kumasi Metropolis with nine sub-metropolitan districts councils. For effective administration, Kumasi Metropolises continuously worked in its divided 9 Sub-Metropolitan District Councils namely Asokwa, Bantama, Kwadaso, Manhyia, Nhyiaeso, Oforikrom, Suame, Subin and Tafo.

In 2017, five (5) former sub-metropolitan district councils were upgraded to municipal assembly status, which consist of the following: Asokwa Municipal District, Kwadaso Municipal District, Oforikrom Municipal District, Old Tafo Municipal District and Suame Municipal District.

== Administration ==
The political governance of the Metropolises vested in Kumasi Metropolitan Assembly (KMA). It is made up of the Metropolitan Chief Executive who is the head and also represents the central government, 136 Assembly members who have power to vote, Members of Parliament and heads of departments of the Assembly.

The Metropolitan Chief Executive or the Mayor of Kumasi is appointed by the President and accepted by not less two-thirds of the General Assembly through voting.

The current Metropolitan Chief Executive is Richard Ofori Agyemang Boadi, who was appointed in April 2025 to oversee the administrative and developmental affairs of Kumasi.

== Sources ==
- "Districts: Kumasi Metropolitan". Statoids.
- Kumasi Metropolitan District
