= List of museums in Ghana =

Museums in Ghana are administered by the Ghana Museums and Monuments Board (GMMB). The agency's history starts with the establishment of an Ethnographic Museum at Achimota College in 1929. The museum was transferred to the Department of Archaeology at the University of the Gold Coast, when the establishment was opened in 1948.

In order to preserve the country's past, the British set up an "Interim Council of the National Museum of the Gold Coast", focus on the creation of a national museum. Both the "Interim Council of the National Museum of the Gold Coast" and the Monuments and Relics Commission merged, leading to the passing of the Museum and Monuments Board Ordinance (GOLD COAST No. 20 of 1957), resulting in the establishment of the GMMB.

There are approximately 28 museums located in the country. The following is a list of museums, including botanical collections and gardens, in Ghana.

== List ==
Name	Photo	Location	Year established	Coordinates	Ref.
Armed Forces Museum		Kumasi	1953	6.6913673°N 1.6248718°W	
Bisa Aberwa Museum		Sekondi-Takoradi	2019	4°55′17.9″N 1°44′38.42″W	
Cape Coast Castle Museum		Cape Coast	1974	5.1036°N 1.2414°W	
Tetteh Quarshie cocoa farm		Mfuom	1879	5.1036°N 1.2414°W	
Elmina Castle Museum		Elmina	1997	5°04′57″N 1°20′53″W	
Elmina Java Museum		Elmina	2003	5.0995°N 1.3468°W	
Fort Apollonia Museum of Nzema Culture and History		Beyin	2010	5.00°N 2.645°W	
Natural History Museum		Legon		5°39′03.4″N 0°11′03.1″W	
Ghana Herbarium, Department of Botany, University of Ghana		Legon	1948	5°39′11.9″N 0°11′17.9″W	
Gramophone Records Museum and Research Centre of Ghana		Cape Coast	1994	5°38′21.5″N 0°09′13.7″W	
Hidden Connections, Wildlife Department, Kakum National Park				5°21′00.2″N 1°22′55.0″W	
Kwame Nkrumah Mausoleum		Accra	1992	5°32′40″N 0°12′10″W	
Opoku Ware II Museum		Kumasi		6°40′46.9″N 1°34′29.8″W	
Manhyia Palace Museum		Kumasi	1925	6°42′13″N 1°36′57″W	
Museum of Archeology, University of Ghana		Legon	1951	5°39′07.9″N 0°10′52.7″W	
Institute of African Studies Teaching Museum		Legon		5°38′57.5″N 0°10′51.8″W	
Museum of Science and Technology		Accra	1963	5.556761°N 0.206059°W	
National Museum of Ghana		Accra	1957	5°33′37.5″N 0°12′23.1″W	
New Juaben Palace Museum		Juaben		6°49′01.9″N 1°25′24.4″W	
Nurom Hat Museum		Kumasi	1960	6°43′01.5″N 1°37′48.3″W	
Prempeh II Jubilee Museum		Kumasi	1954	6°42′05.3″N 1°37′48.0″W	
Upper East Regional Museum		Bolgatanga	1991	10°47′39.3″N 0°51′21.6″W	
Ussher Fort Museum		Accra	2007	5.5385°N 0.2082°W	
Volta Regional Museum		Ho	1973	6.608611°N 0.468889°E	
W. E. B. Du Bois Memorial Centre for Pan African Culture		Accra	1985	5°34′56.3″N 0°10′15.4″W	
Yaa Asantewaa Museum		Ejisu	2000	6.7136°N 1.4670°W	
Centre for National Culture		Kumasi	1956	6°42′02.3″N 1°37′45.1″W	
Nkyinkyim Museum		Nuhalenya-Ada	2009	5°54′49.3″N 0°28′28.9″E	

== See also ==
- Lists of museums
