= St. Hubert Minor Seminary Senior High School =

Catholic school in Ashanti Region, Ghana

St. Hubert Minor Seminary Senior High School (often referred to as SAHUSS) is a public Catholic senior high school for boys located in Santasi, a suburb of Kumasi in the Ashanti Region of Ghana.
