= Amakom =

- Urban area
- Location within Ghana
- Coordinates: 6°41′N 1°36′W
- Country: Ghana
- Region: Ashanti Region
- District: Kumasi Metropolitan
- Time zone: GMT
  - Summer (DST): GMT

Amakom is a suburb of Kumasi in the Ashanti Region of Ghana. It is located in between Asokwa and Asafo Kumasi. It has a market called Anwona dwam where traders from nearby towns come and sell and buy. It has about close to 10 areas and has contributed to the progress of Kumasi Metropolitan Assembly and Ghana as a whole. It is believed that Manhyia came to meet Amakom in existence same as Kumasi. Amakom is one the oldest suburbs in Kumasi and Ashanti region.

It has produced public figures and celebrities like Kofi Adu, who is an actor, and has contributed to the Kumawood and the Cinema of Ghana movies since the early 2000s.
