= Manhyia (disambiguation) =

Manhyia is a town in the Eastern Region of Ghana.

Manhyia may also refer to:

- Manhyia (Ghana parliament constituency)
- Manhyia Palace Official residence of the Asantehene
- Manhyia Palace Museum
