= Kwame Baah =

Kwame Baah may refer to:

- Kwame Baah (politician) (1938–1997), Ghanaian soldier and politician
- Kwame Baah (footballer) (born 1998), Ghanaian footballer
- Kwame Baah (music manager) (born 1992), Ghanaian music manager and musician
