= Centre for National Culture (Kumasi) =

Museum in Kumasi, Ghana

- Former name: Asante Cultural Centre; National Cultural Centre
- Established: 1956; 70 years ago
- Location: Kumasi, Ghana
- Coordinates: 6°42′02.3″N 1°37′45.1″W
- Type: Cultural centre
- Founder: Alex A. Y. Kyerematen
- Director: Peter Kofi Marfo
- Owners: Centre for National Culture, Ghana

Centre for National Culture, formerly known as the National Cultural Centre, is a culture centre in Kumasi, located in the Ashanti Region of Ghana. It was established in 1956. It's the location of the Prempeh II Jubilee Museum.

== History ==
Before Ghana's independence, Alex A. Y. Kyerematen, with support from then Asantehene Prempeh II and the Asanteman Council, started planning on the establishment of the "Asante Cultural Centre" to preserve and showcase Asante culture. It was planned to have facilities such as a library, a traditional chapel, an exhibition hall, a theatre, a dance arena, and a museum. It was to be an open-air museum and a cultural centre.

The centre opened in 1956. A ceremony was held for the opening of the museum, where Prempeh II laid the foundation stone for the centre's main attraction, the "Traditional House for the Ashanti Museum and Art Gallery."

The centre came into conflict with national policies of Ghanaian first president, Kwame Nkrumah, and was subsequently renamed to the "National Cultural Centre" in 1963. The centre was renamed again in 1990 to the "Centre of National Culture" in part due to the PNDC Government policy framework of decentralization.

== See also ==
- List of museums in Ghana

== Cited work ==
- Dumouchelle, K. (2011). "Traditions of Modernity: Currents in Architectural Expression in Kumasi". Ghana Studies. 12. University of Wisconsin Press: 155–188. doi:10.1353/ghs.2009.0007.
