= Museum of Science and Technology (Accra) =

Science museum in Accra, Ghana

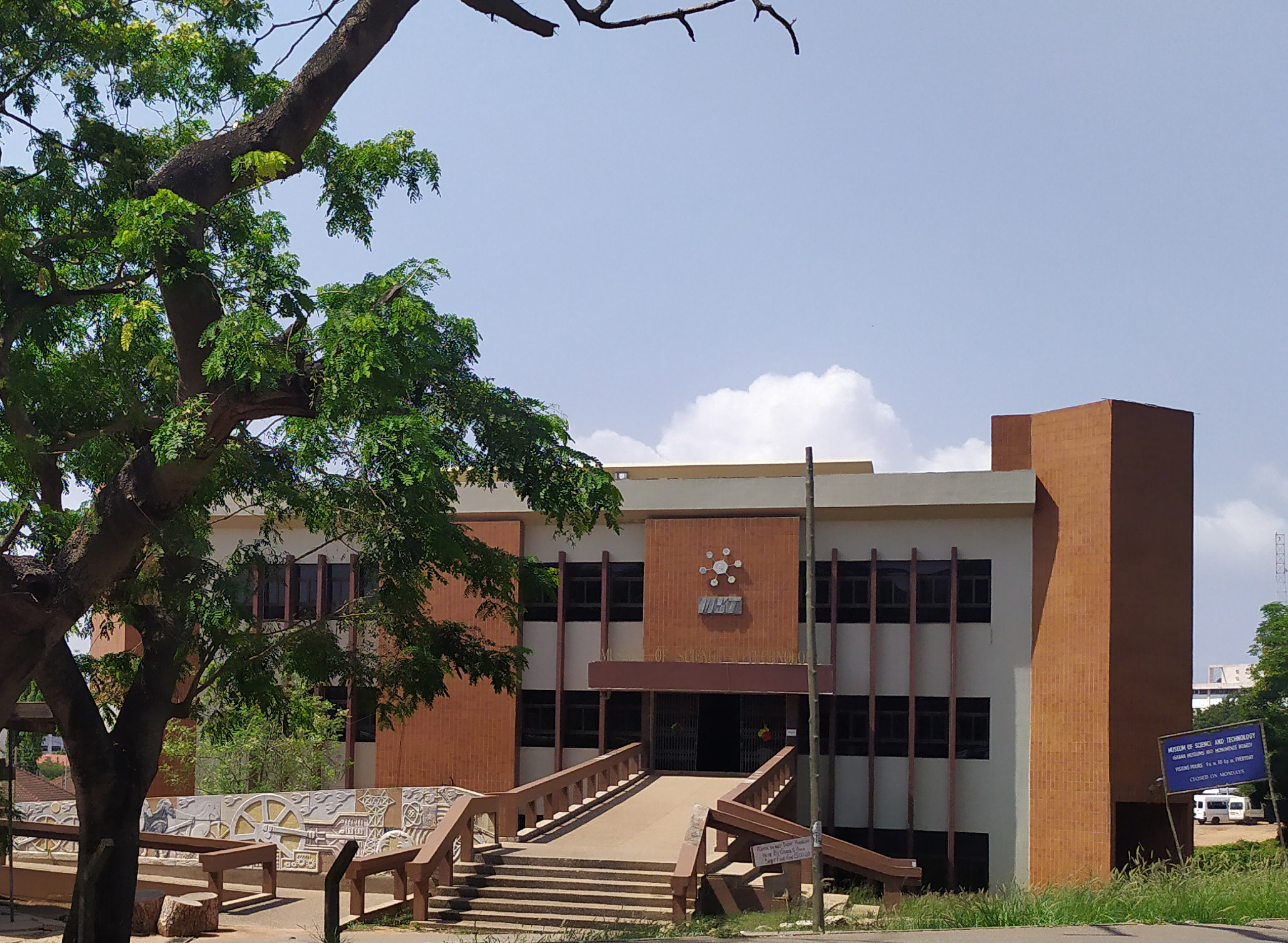
- Museum of Science and Technology building in Acrra
- Established: 1965
- Location: Accra
- Coordinates: 5.556761°N 0.206059°W
- Type: Science museum
- Accreditation: Ghana Museums and Monuments Board
- Owner: Government of Ghana
- Website: www.ghanamuseums.org/science-tech-museum.php

The Museum of Science and Technology in Accra, Ghana was established in 1963 and first opened its doors in 1965. The museum is under the administration of the Ghana Museums and Monuments Board and the National Commission on Culture.

== Background ==
The aim in establishing the museum was to create an awareness of past and present developments in science and technology in Ghana. Two lecturers from the University of Ghana presented a proposal to Kwame Nkrumah, who was the President of Ghana at the time. The original museum building has been shut down and the exhibits have migrated into its current building which experienced enormous delays in its construction.

== Location ==
The museum is located in the heart of Accra. It is located close to the intersection of Barnes Road to the east and Liberia Road to the south in Accra. West of the museum is the University of Ghana Accra City Campus and to the north are the offices of the National Service Scheme and the Regional Coordination Council.

== Activities ==
In addition to displaying exhibits to the public, the museum contains a library. It also organises educational activities for school children. In 2019, there was an Evolution of Science exhibition funded by Wellcome which highlighted activities related to health and space research.

== Opening hours ==
The museum usually opens daily on week days from 9:00 am to 4:30pm. It also charges gate fees.

== See also ==
- List of museums in Ghana
