= Upper East Regional Museum =

Museum in Bolgatanga, Upper East Region of Ghana

The Upper East Regional Museum
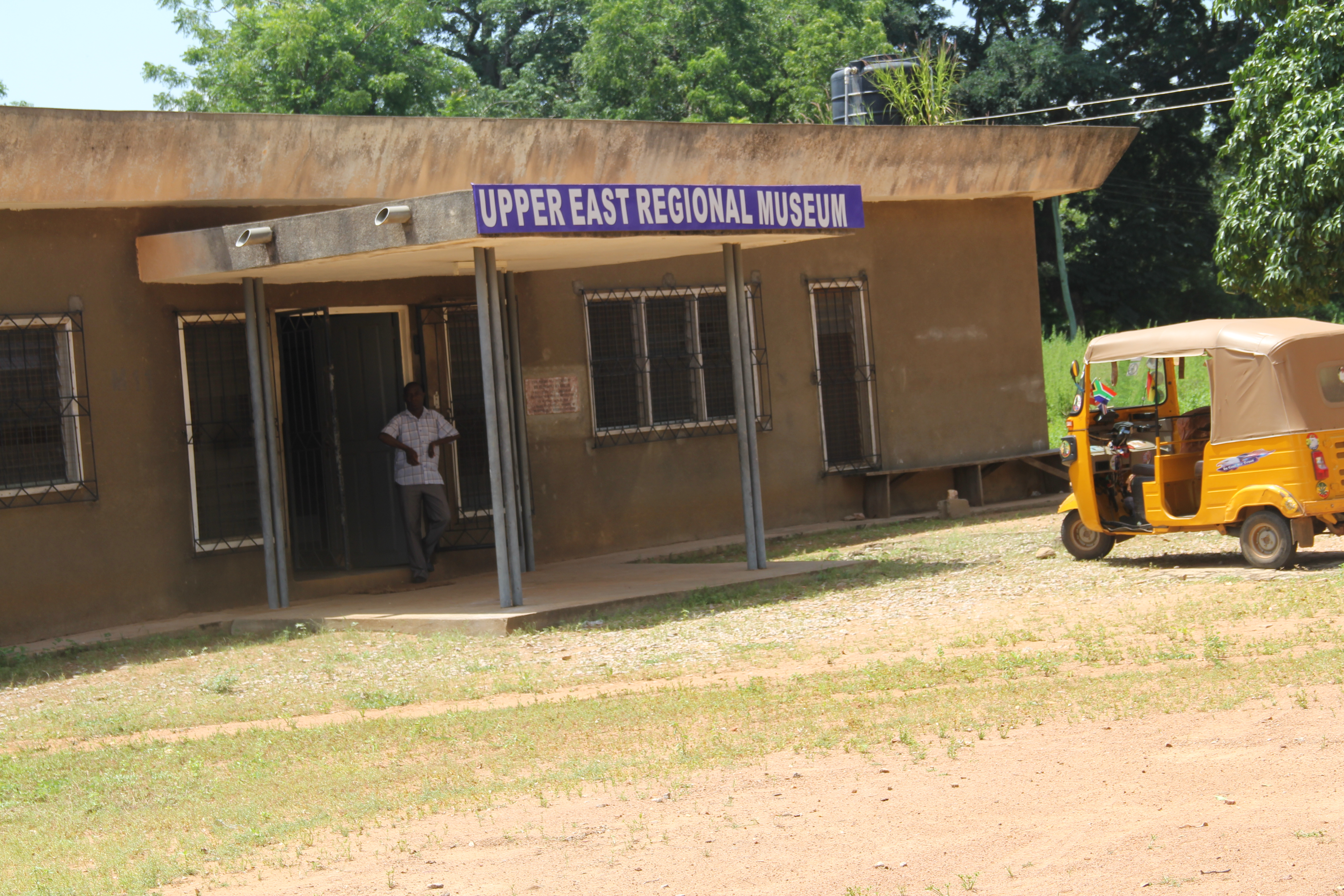
- Established: 1972
- Location: Bolgatanga, Ghana.
- Coordinates: 10°47′40″N 0°51′21″W

The Upper East Regional Museum is a museum located in Bolgatanga, Ghana. The Upper East Regional Museum was established in 1972 and installed in its current location in 1991, by the Ghana National Commission on Culture. The museum is situated behind the Regional Library and adjacent to the craft village.

The Upper East Regional Museum is currently headed by, Mrs. Prisca Naambome Yenzie. Patronage of the facility has seen an appreciable increase over time.

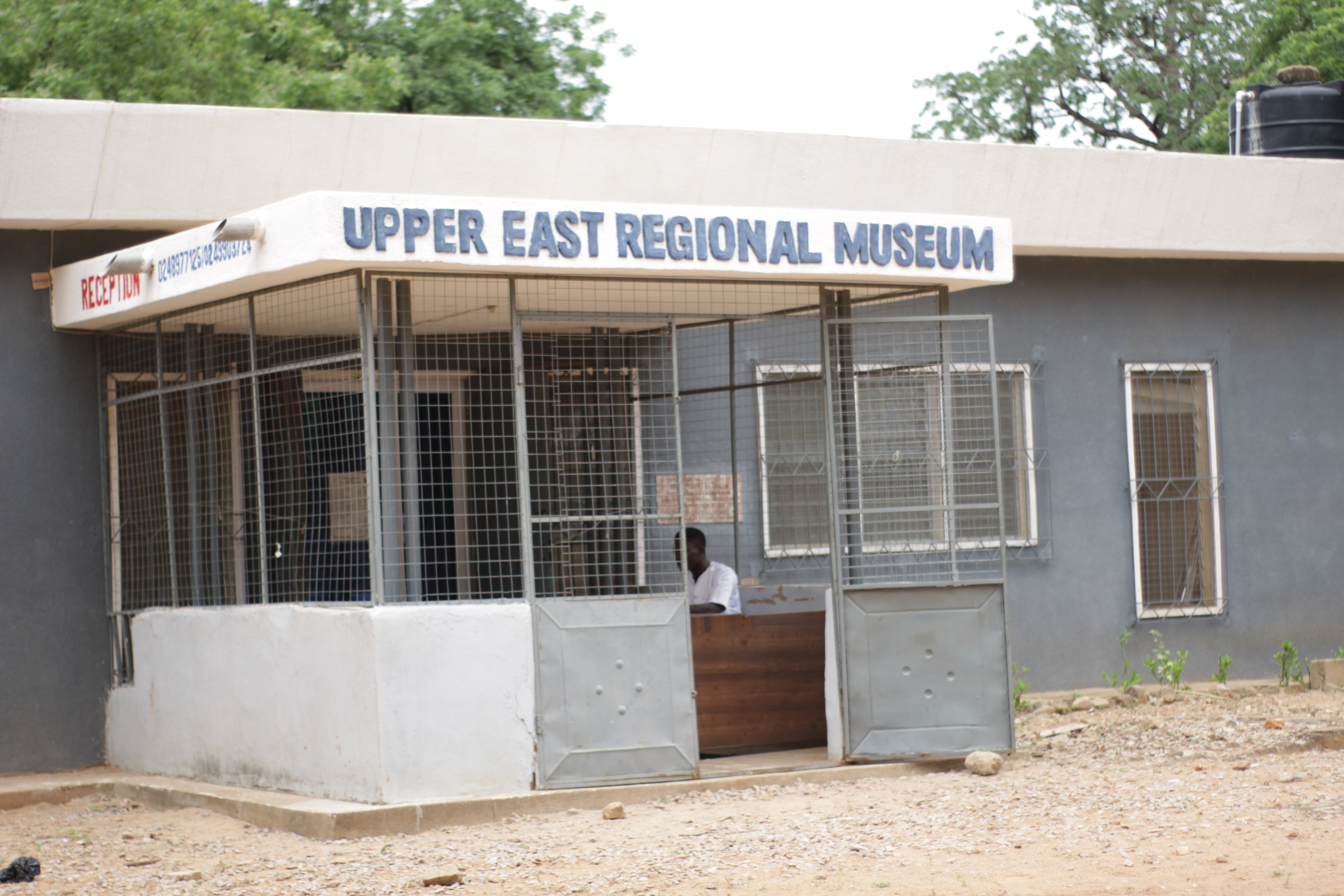
Building of the Upper East Regional Museum

== See also ==
- List of museums in Ghana
