= Yaa Asantewaa Museum =

Museum and tourist site in Ashanti Region, Ghana

The Yaa Asantewaa Museum
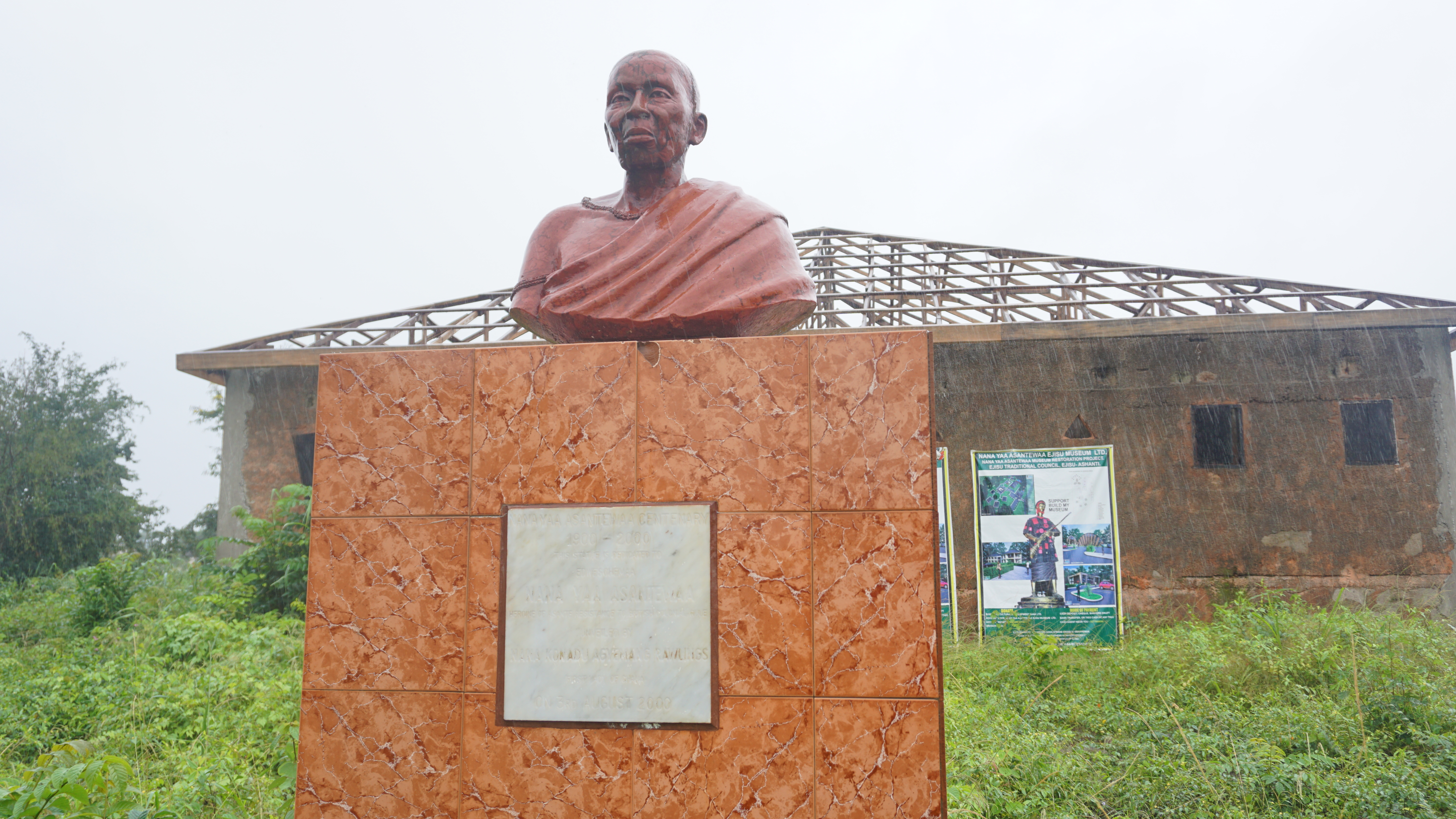
- Museum facade alongside the statue of Asantewaa in 2016.
- Established: 2000
- Location: Near to Regional Road 104, Ejisu, Ashanti Region, Ghana
- Coordinates: 6.7136°N 1.4670°W

The Yaa Asantewaa Museum is a museum in Ejisu Municipal District in the Ashanti Region of Ghana. It was built to honor legendary Ashanti leader Yaa Asantewaa, who was the queen mother of Ejisu.

The museum was established in 2000, to mark the centenary of the Yaa Asantewaa War. It aimed to recreate a typical Asante royal residence from ca. 1900. Located at her grave side in Besease, the hometown of Yaa Asantewaa, it gives off the modern feel of the days of the old through the memories of war.

== Gutted By Fire ==
In 2004, the museum was gutted by a fire. Most of its relics that were inside were destroyed, and only a few clay pots remained. As a result of the fire and closure of the museum, tourism within the area significantly decreased.

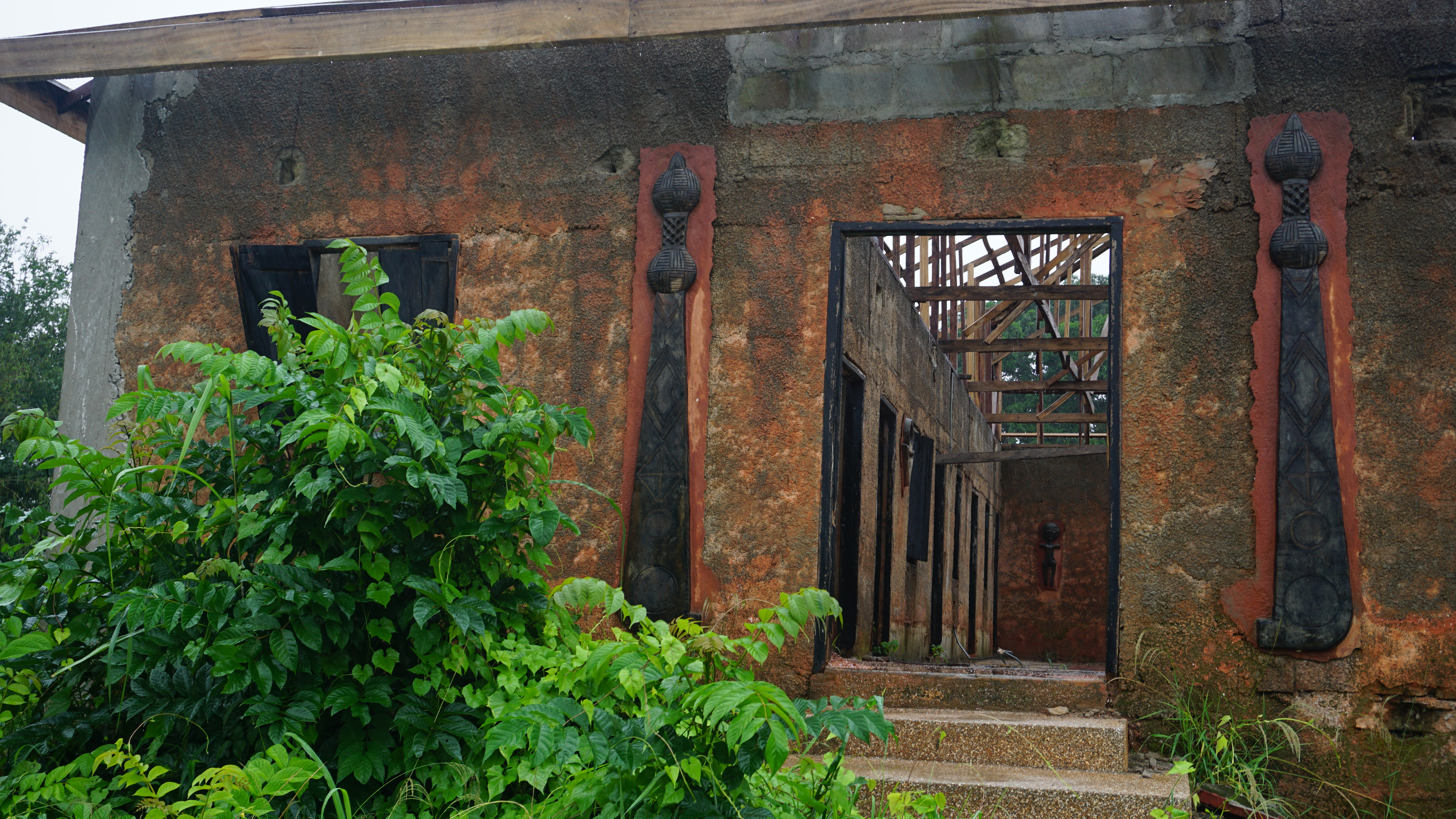

== Rebuilding ==
In October 2009, local leaders expressed a desire to refurbish the museum, and in 2016 UNICEF agreed to contribute US$10 million towards its reconstruction. The new facility was to be constructed on a 14-acre plot of land. The Ejisu-Juabeng Municipal Assembly was tasked to spearhead the reconstruction process but the re-construction stalled.

In February 2024, a new pledge from the Asantehene to construct a new heritage museum to honor the late queen mother was made again. According to them, the new museum was to be called Yaa Asantewaa Memorial Heritage Museum with artistic impression showcasing a modern feel of old traditional memories.

== See also ==
- List of museums in Ghana
