= Nurom Hat Museum =

Museum and tourist site in Kumasi, Ghana

The Nurom Hat Museum
- Established: 1960
- Location: Kumasi, Ghana

The Nurom Hat Museum is a museum with hats from all over the world, located in Kumasi, Ghana. It was established in 1960.

== See also ==
- List of museums in Ghana
