= Cape Coast Castle Museum =

Coordinates: 5.1036°N 1.2414°W

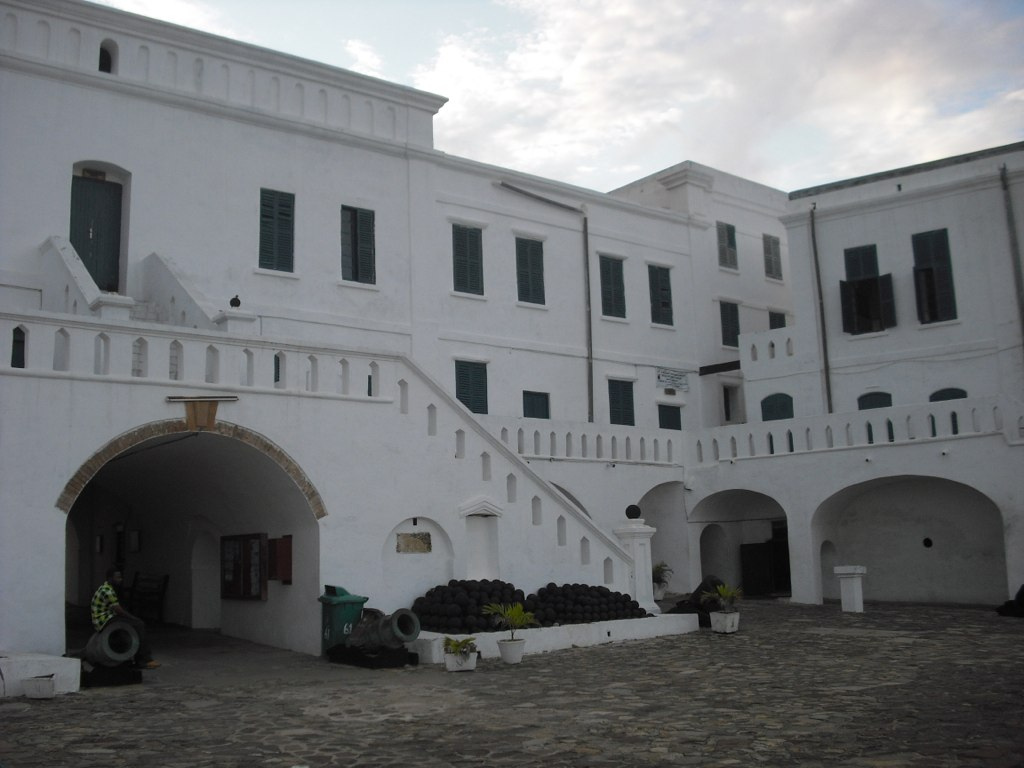
- Established: 1974
- Location: Cape Coast, Ghana
- Type: ethnographic and archeological museum
- Website: capecoastcastlemuseum.com

Cape Coast Castle Museum is an ethnography and archeological museum located in Cape Coast, Ghana. It was established in 1974, and operates out of the Cape Coast Castle.

== See also ==
- List of museums in Ghana
