= Adabraka (Kumasi) =

- Urban area
- Country: Ghana
- Region: Ashanti Region
- District: Kumasi Metropolitan
- Time zone: GMT
  - Summer (DST): GMT

Adabraka is a suburb of Kumasi in the Ashanti Region of Ghana.
