= Kumasi Zoo =

Zoo in the Ashanti Region of Ghana

Coordinates: 6.701°N 1.626°W

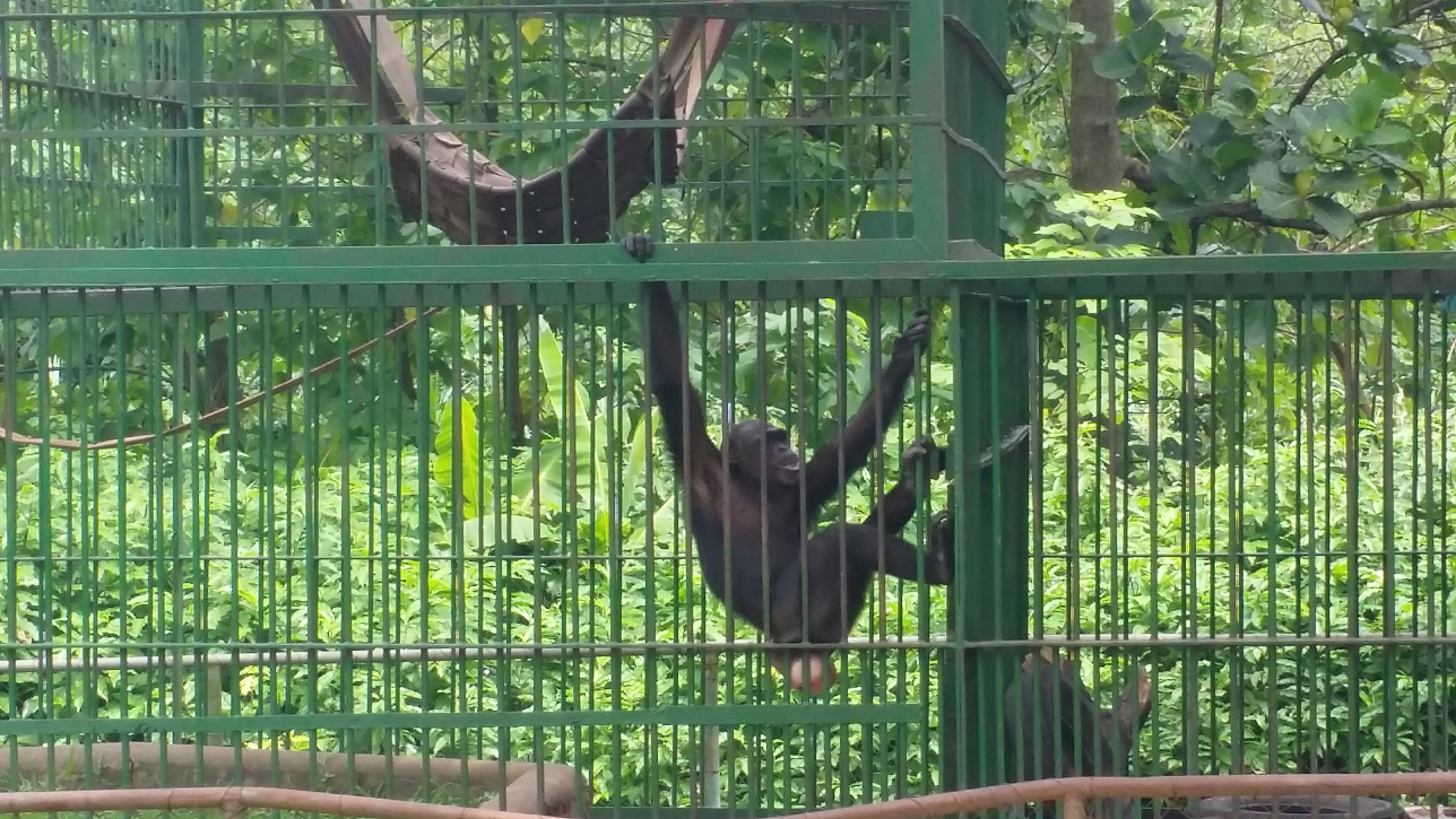
- A Chimpanzee in an enclosure at the Kumasi Zoo.
- Interactive map of Kumasi Zoo
- Date opened: 1957
- Location: Kumasi, Ashanti Region, Ghana
- Land area: 370 acres (150 ha)
- No. of animals: 135
- No. of species: 40

The Kumasi Zoo (Kumasi Zoological Garden) is a zoo located in the heart of Kumasi in the Ashanti Region of Ghana. The zoo occupies a 1.5-square-kilometre (370-acre) area between the Kejetia Bus Terminal, the old race course and the Kumasi Centre for National Culture.

== History ==
The zoo was established in 1951 and officially opened in 1957 by the Asanteman Council to conserve nature and display indigenous wild animals of Ghana.

== Animal species ==
It has about 40 different species of animals, with individual animals numbering over 135. A notable feature is the thousands of bats that rest on trees in the zoo.
