= Manhyia Palace Museum =

Historical museum in Ashanti Region, Ghana

The Manhyia Palace Museum
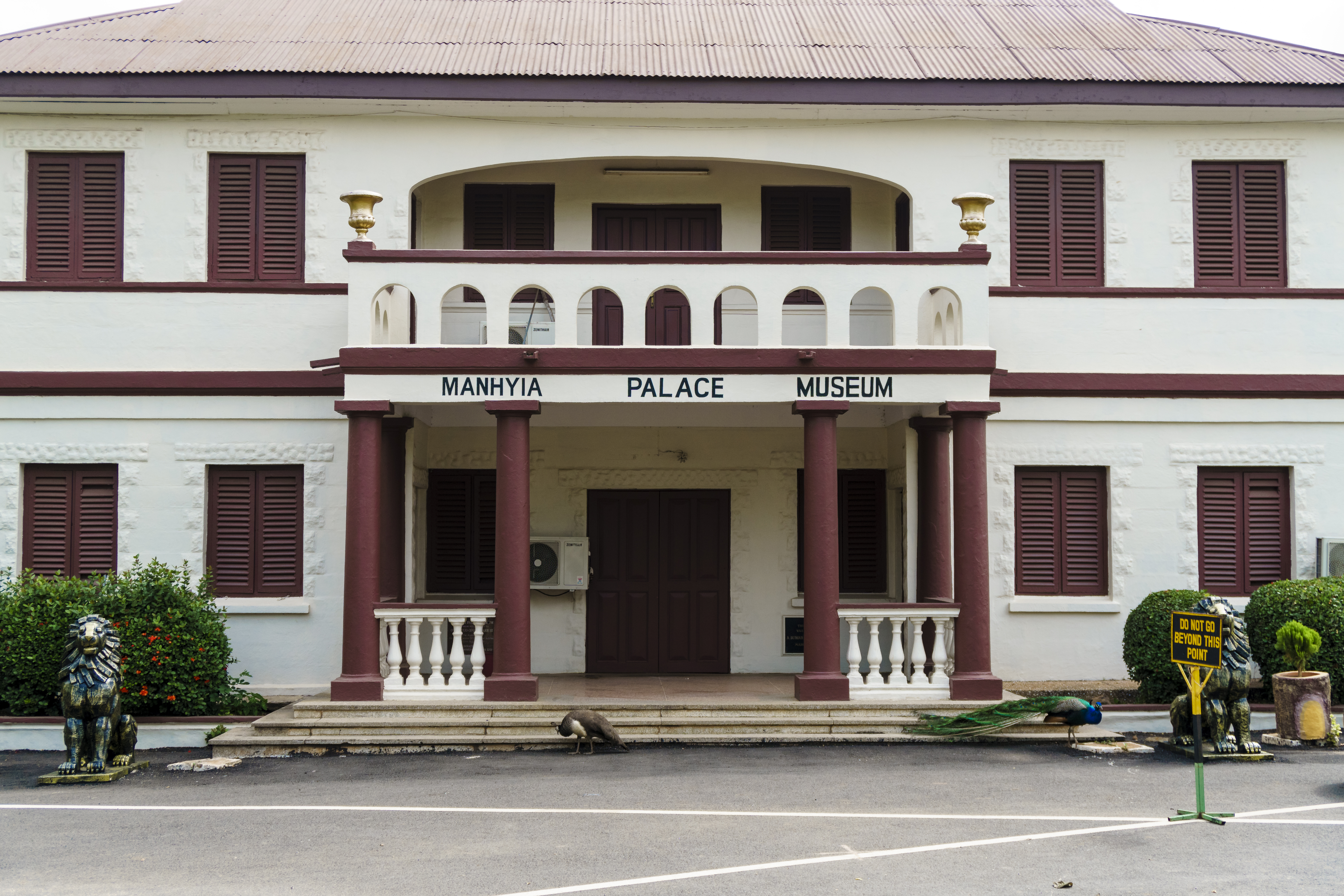
- Established: 1925
- Location: Kumasi, Ashanti, Ghana
- Coordinates: 6°42′15″N 1°36′57″W
- Type: historical museum

The Manhyia Palace Museum is a historical museum located in Kumasi, Ashanti, Ghana and situated within the Manhyia Palace. It was first established in 1925 as a private residence for Asantehene Agyeman Prempeh I (who had been returning from almost three decades of exile), and was built as compensation for the destruction of the palace at Adum during the Yaa Asentewaa war in 1900. The Museum currently provides an insight into the culture of Ashantiland and Ghana's cultural legacy from before its colonization by Great Britain. It primarily serves "to commemorate (the Ashanti people's) own kings, queens and leaders and to communicate the riches of their history and culture to future generations". and generally features video presentations and key historical items pertaining to Ashantiland and Ghana's ancestry. It was rehabilitated in 1995 at about 12,000 cedis and subsequently reopened to the public on August 12 of that year by Otumfuo Opoku Ware II, the 15th King as part of his Silver Jubilee celebration.

In May 2024, after being closed for several months, the Manhyia Palace Museum once again reopened - on this occasion part of the Silver Jubilee celebrations of the ascension of the stool of Otumfuo Osei Tutu II. Highlights were 32 Asante artefacts loaned to the Museum by the British Museum and the Victoria and Albert Museum in the UK.

== See also ==
- List of museums in Ghana
