= Suame Magazine, Kumasi =

Industrialized area in Ashanti Region, Ghana

Suame
- Industrialized Area
- Location in Ghana
- Country: Ghana
- Region: Ashanti Region

Suame Magazine is an industrialized area with many workshops for metal engineering and vehicle repairs in Ghana, employing an estimated 200,000 workers. It is located 10 kilometers from Kumasi, the capital of the Ashanti Region. It is in the Suame constituency of Ghana and part of the KMA's administrative district. It is the most industrialized zone in Ghana and one of the largest industrialized zones in Africa.

== SMATI Turtle 1 ==
A prototype robust vehicle, the SMATI Turtle 1, intended for use in rough terrains in Africa was designed and manufactured by artisans of Suame Magazine. They completed it with local tools and was unveiled in April 2013.

The car will be tested for roadworthiness and further developed with support of the Dutch Government.
