= Gramophone Records Museum and Research Centre of Ghana =

Museum in Cape Coast, Ghana

The Gramophone Records Museum and Research Centre of Ghana (GRMRC)
- Established: 1994 December
- Owner: Kwame Sarpong

The Gramophone Records Museum and Research Centre of Ghana (GRMRC) is a museum dedicated to preserving Ghanaian recordings. It was founded by Kwame Sarpong and opened to the public in December 1994. It is located in the Centre for National Culture in Cape Coast.

In 2003, the Daniel Langlois Foundation for the Art, Science and Technology in Canada began sponsoring a project to digitise Highlife recordings from the museum's collections. Some of the museum's holdings have been transferred to CD for the Archive of Folk Culture at the Library of Congress's American Folklife Center.

== See also ==
- List of music museums
