= Bisa Aberwa Museum =

Museum in Western Region, Ghana

Coordinates: 4.9216378926986835°N 1.7440050232888715°W

Bisa Abrewa Museum is a museum in Nkontompo in the Sekondi-Takoradi Metropolis of the Western Region, Ghana. The museum contains sculptures made from wood, clay and cement, as well as paintings and photographs. The museum has about 2,200 artifacts relating to heroes of Africa, as well as sculptures and photographs relating to the civil rights movement and other Black personalities in the French, Portuguese and Spanish Caribbean.

The Museum is believed to be one of the world's largest private collections of artifacts, audio visual and sculptures representing the history of Africa. It was inaugurated by the first lady of Ghana, Rebecca Akuffo Addo, government officials and traditional leaders on July 28, 2019.

== History ==
The Museum was curated by Kwaw Ansah, an award-winning filmmaker, founder and first CEO of TV Africa. It was formed from a collection which was begun in the 1980s.
