= John Owusu Addo =

Ghanaian architect (born 1928)

- Born: 30 May 1928 (age 98); Akwadum, Eastern Region, Ghana
- Education: Achimota Specialist Training College; Kumasi College of Science and Technology
- Occupation: Architect
- Style: Tropical Modernism

John Owusu Addo (born 30 May 1928) is a Ghanaian architect.

== Personal life ==
John Owusu Addo was born on 30 May 1928 in Akwadum, Eastern Region of Ghana, as the second child of his mother and a son of his late father. Addo is a seed of the royal Apempoa family. His family moved from the Ashanti Region following a disagreement with the Ashanti King in 1875. They later settled in a farming village in the Eastern region of Ghana, Akwadum.

== Education ==
Addo had his basic education at Akwadum Methodist School. He relocated to the capital of the Eastern Region after the death of his father to live with his sister and her husband. Following his completion of Standard 7 with distinction, he gained admission into Kumasi Wesley College Teacher Training College from 1944 to 1947. He continued to study arts after his four-year education at the teacher training college. Having passed the entrance exams, he enrolled in Achimota Specialist Training College to study arts until 1950. His interest in architecture grew while at Achimota Specialist Training College.

== Career ==
Addo sat for the London Matriculation Exams in 1951, which he passed. He was posted as a teacher to his premier station at the College of Education, Bechem, and then St Joseph's Training College. He was moved to Kumasi College of Science and Technology (now Kwame Nkrumah University of Science and Technology – KNUST) after a year in Bechem. There, his interest in architecture heightened after his encounter with some construction projects. He designed the Community Center and the Unity Hall of Residence and Senior Staff Clubhouse on the KNUST campus, He is well known for his use of the style Tropical Modernism.

Addo co-founded the Ghana Institute of Architecture and received the Order of the Volta in 2005.

In 2017, he was knighted by Queen Elizabeth II and was named one of the most influential people of the year by Time Magazine.
