= Prempeh II Jubilee Museum =

Museum in Kumasi, Ghana

- Established: 1954
- Location: Kumasi, Ghana
- Coordinates: 6°42′05.3″N 1°37′48.0″W

The Prempeh II Jubilee Museum is a museum located in Kumasi, Ghana. It was established in 1954. The museum is located in The Centre of National Culture.

The museum is named after Prempeh II. It features artifacts related to him.

== See also ==
- List of museums in Ghana
