= Asafo Kumasi =

Asafo
- Urban area
- Country: Ghana
- Region: Ashanti Region
- District: Kumasi Metropolitan District
- Time zone: GMT
  - Summer (DST): GMT

Asafo is a suburb of Kumasi in the Ashanti Region of Ghana. It is located near the Ahmadiyya Muslim Mosque and is approximately a five-minute walk from the Baba Yara Sports Stadium.
