= Santasi, Kumasi =

Santasi
- Suburb
- Location in Ghana
- Coordinates: 6°39′N 1°37′W
- Country: Ghana
- Region: Ashanti Region
- District: Kumasi Metropolitan District

Santasi is suburb of Kumasi. Kumasi is the regional capital of the Ashanti Region of Ghana. It is both a residential and industrial area in the Kumasi Metropolitan Assembly. It is about 6kilometres westwards from centre of the regional capital.

== Notable place ==
The Opoku Ware School, a boys second cycle institution is in the town. The school is a mission school under the Ghana Catholic Secretariat.

Saint Hubert is another all boys second cycle institution situated in the town.
