= Kwame Baah (music manager) =

Ghanaian music manager

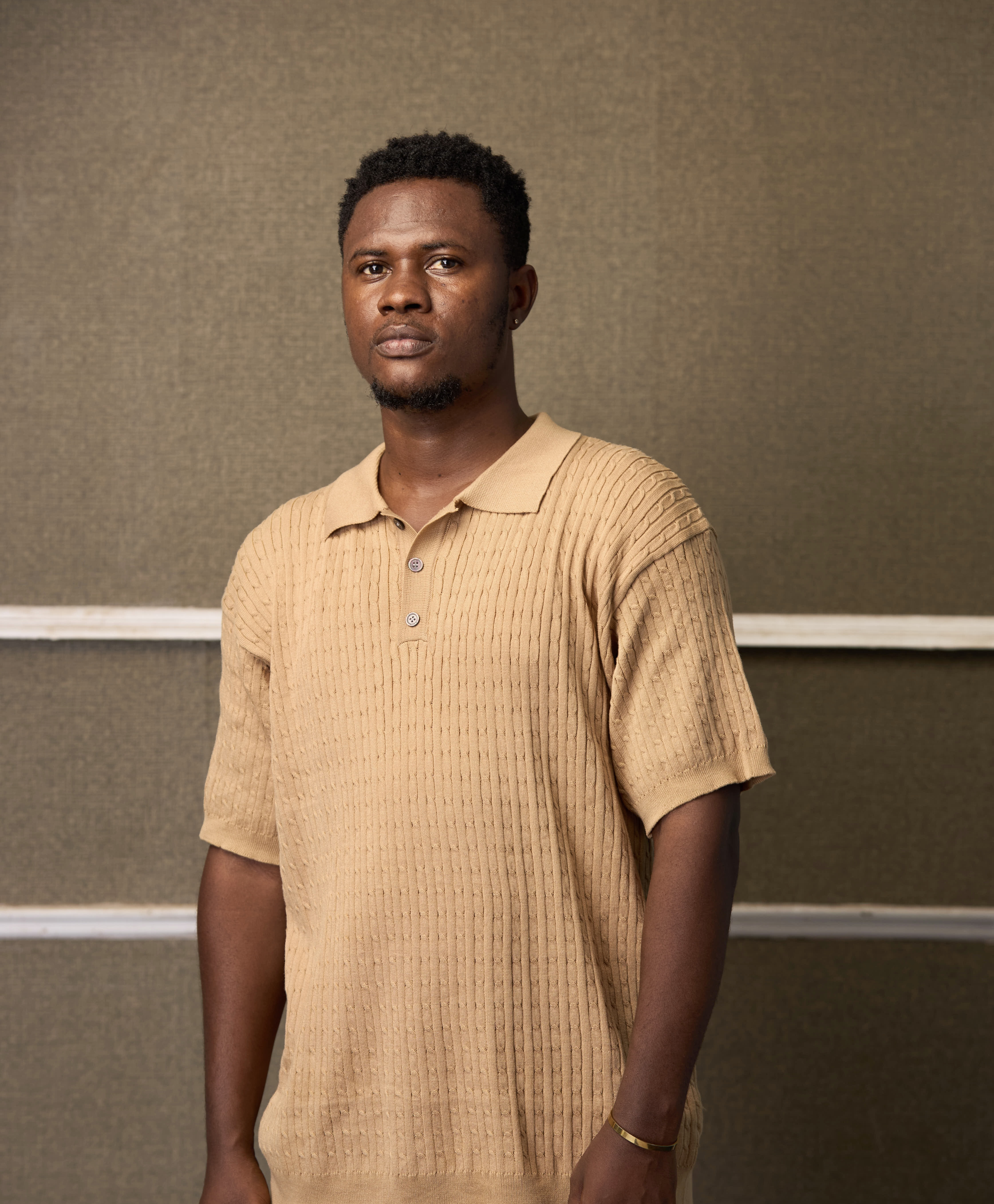
- Kwame Baah
- Born: Bismark Baah; 14 March 1992 (age 34); Accra, Ghana
- Occupations: Music Entrepreneur, Talent Manager
- Years active: 2019–present
- Known for: Yve Digital

Bismark Baah alias Kwame Baah is a Ghanaian Talent manager, music entrepreneur and a former recording artist. He is the co-founder of Yve Digital, a music distribution platform and in 2023, founded Get The Artiste, an artiste booking platform.

== Early life and education ==
Kwame was born on 14 March 1992 in Kumasi where he was also raised. Kwame Baah completed Konongo Odumase Senior High School in 2011 and continued to pursue Art Education at the University Of Education.

== Career ==
He started as a musician and gained recognition in Kumasi. In 2018, he moved to Accra through the CEO of Farmhouse Productions, Ivan Quashigah, who offered him a job as an online manager to help promote his productions; Yolo Season 5, Stryke!, TV3 Mentor Reloaded, Ghana's Most Beautiful, and a host of others.

In 2019, he created Yve Digital, one of the first music aggregation companies in Ghana and distributed music for Okyeame Kwame, Fameye, D-Black, Wendy Shay, Sista Afia, Amerado, Yaw Tog, King Paluta and others.

In 2023, he launched another music company, Get The Artiste, to facilitate the booking of musicians for events.

== Honors ==
- He was nominated under the Music & Entertainment category for the 2022 Forty Under 40 Awards.
- He Won the Best Music and Entertainment Personality at the 2023 Forty Under 40 Awards.

In 2025, Hot List Africa named Kwame among the Top 30 Hottest Music Executives on the African Continent, recognizing his impact in developing the region’s independent music scene. The same year, The Upper Entertainment featured him in its "10 African Music Tech Leaders Pushing Pop Culture Forward" article, describing Baah as a "pragmatic innovator" for his contributions to digital music distribution through Yve Digital and Get the Artiste.

== See also ==
- Kwame Baah discography
