= Manhyia =

Coordinates: 6°43′N 1°43′W

- Rural area
- Location within Ghana
- Country: Ghana
- Region: Eastern Region
- District: West Akim District
- Time zone: GMT
  - Summer (DST): GMT

Manhyia is a town in the West Akim District of the Eastern Region of Ghana.
