= Kumasi =

City in Ashanti Region, Ghana

Kumasi Kumase (Twi)
- City
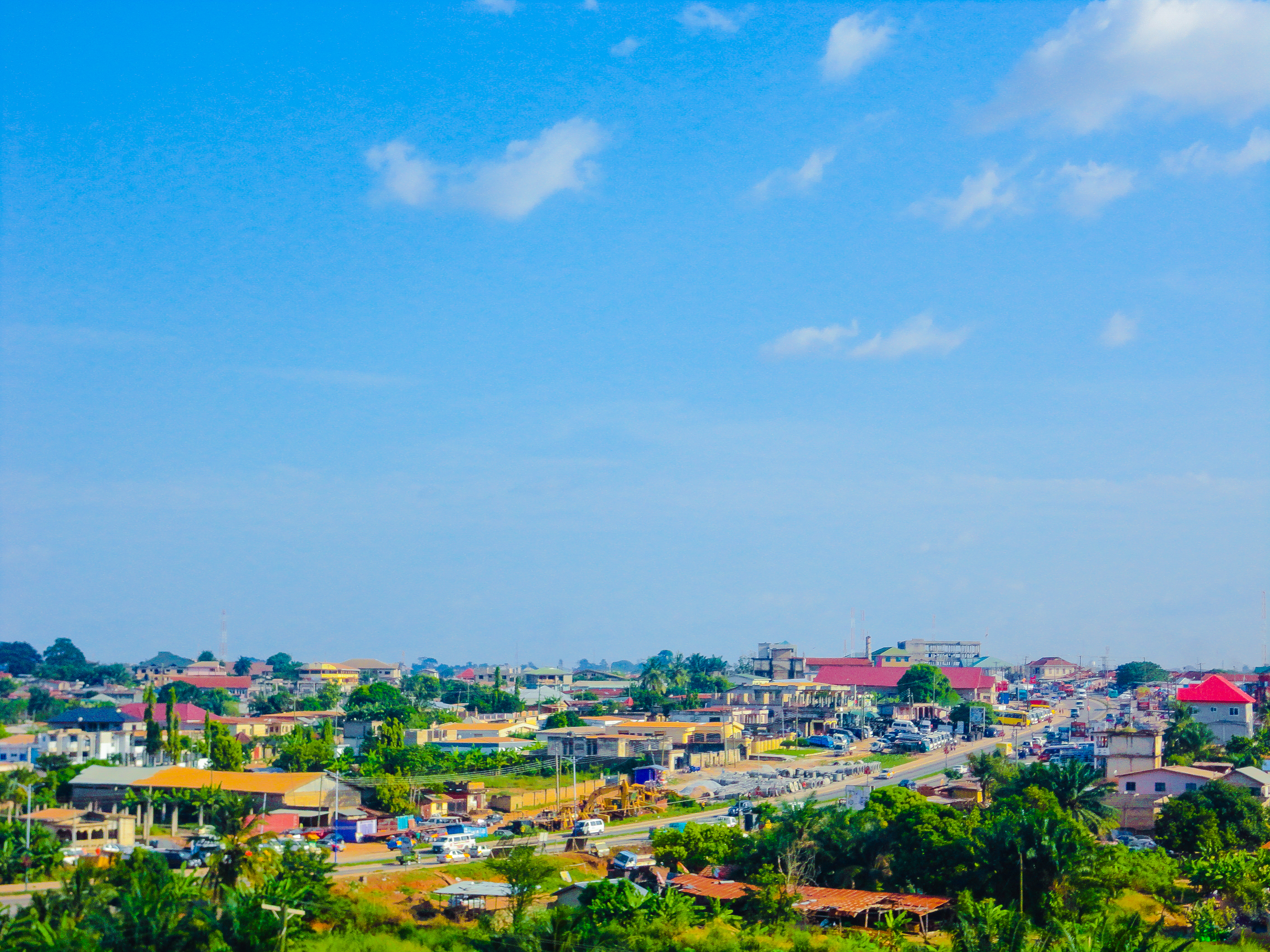
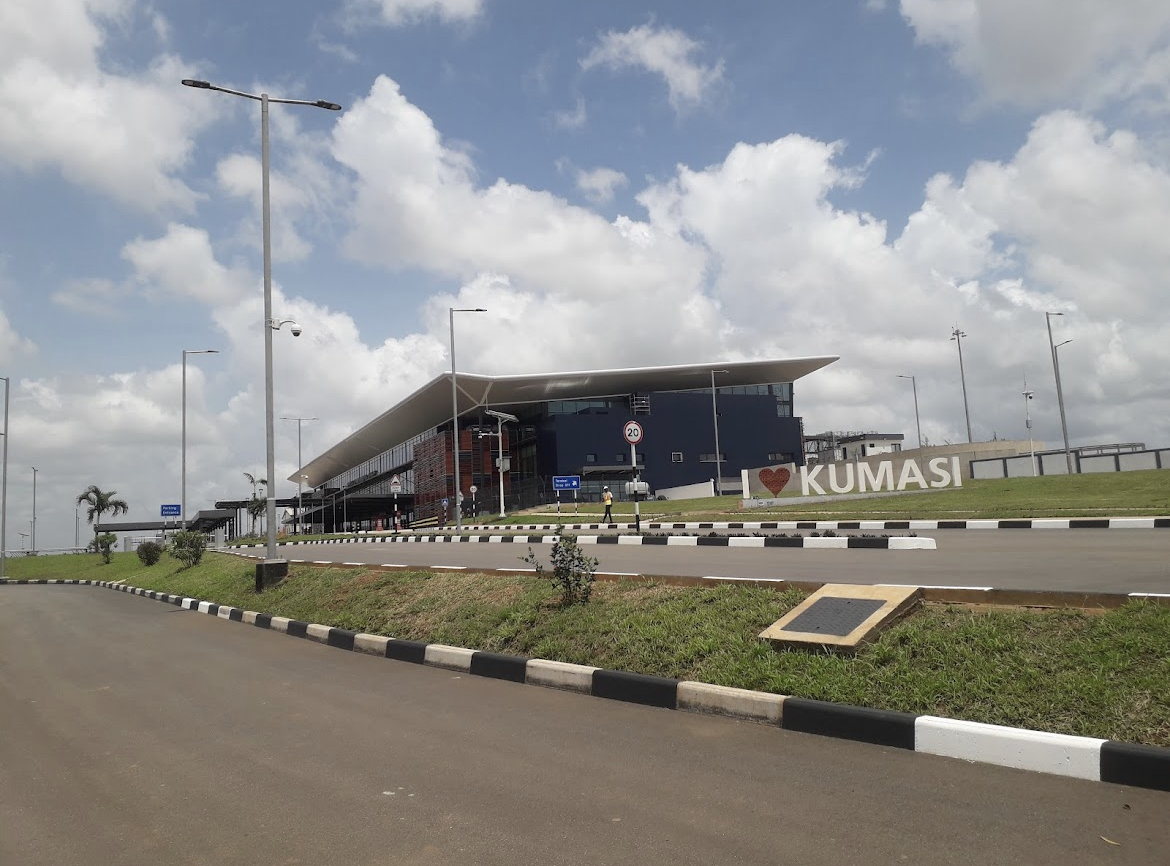
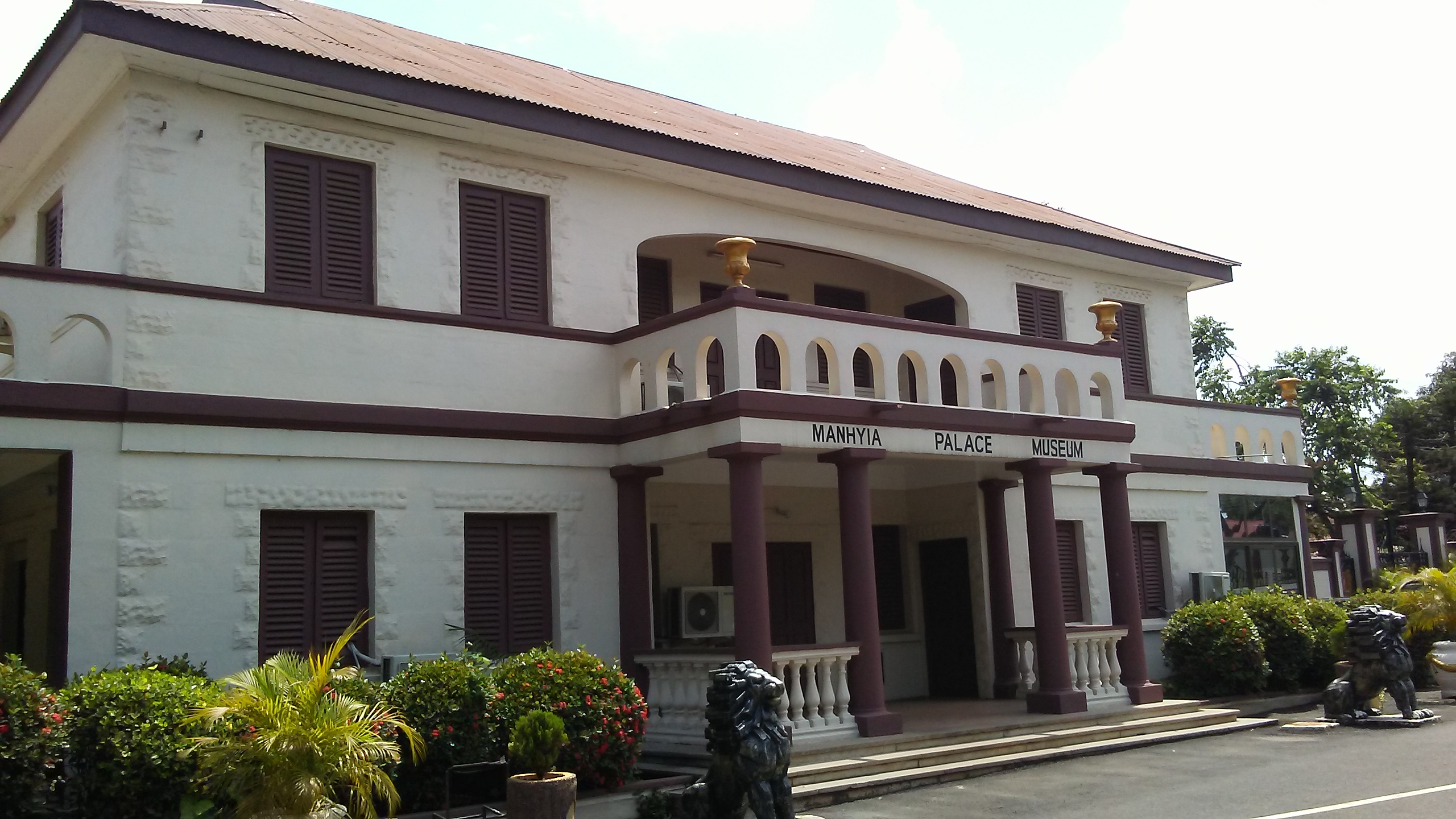
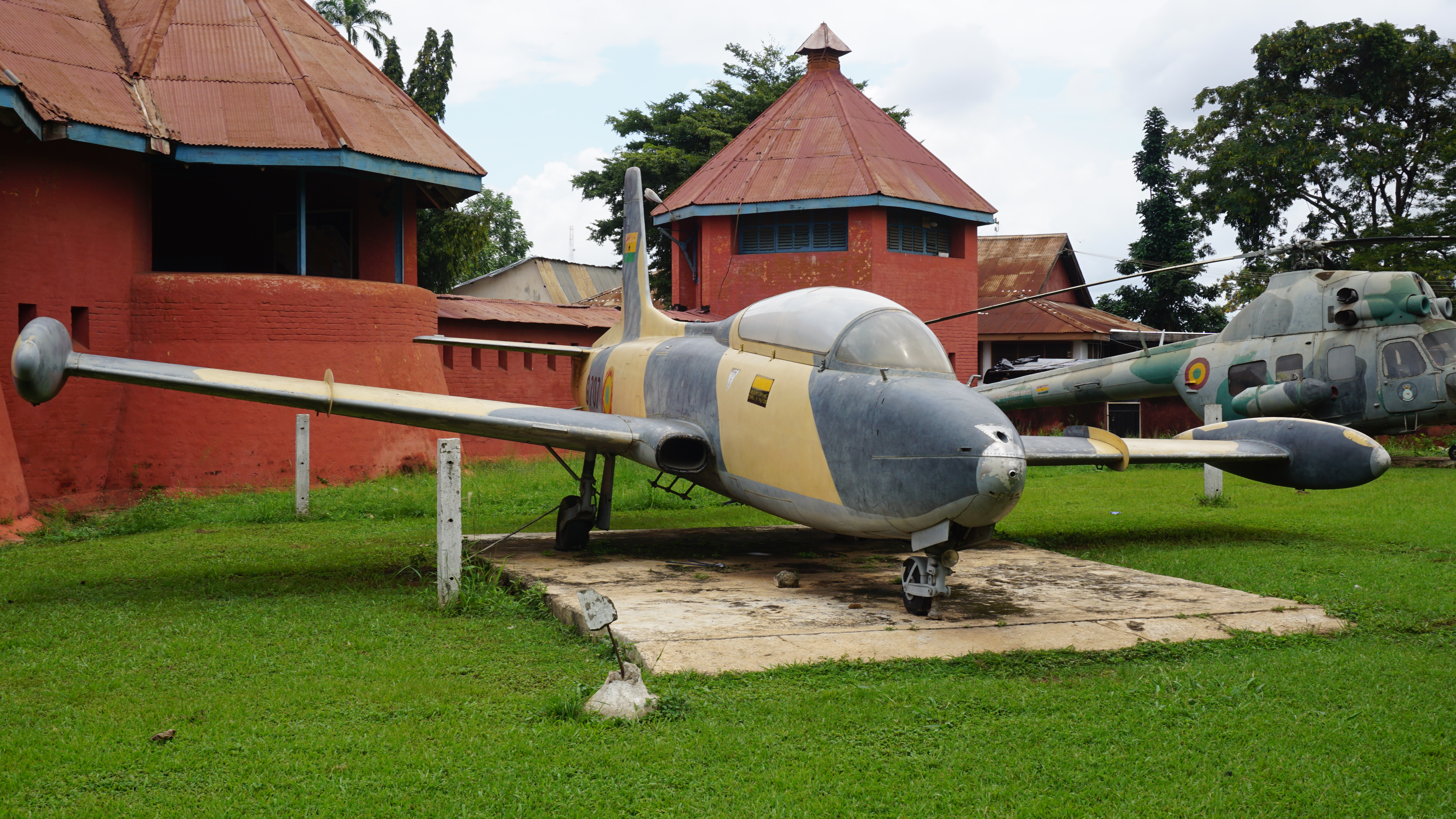
- Top to bottom; left to right: Kronom suburb in Kumasi, Prempeh I International Airport, Manhyia Palace, Armed Forces Museum

- Flag
- Etymology: Twi: Kumase ("under the kum tree")
- Nicknames: The Garden City, Oseikrom
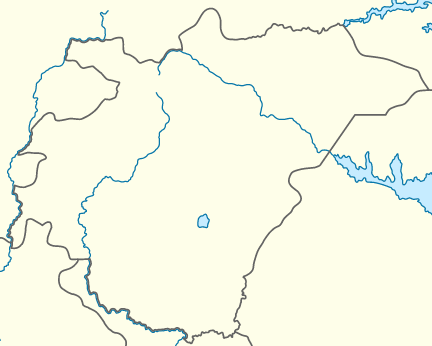
- Location within Ashanti Location within Ghana Location within Africa
- Coordinates: 06°42′00″N 01°37′30″W
- Country: Ghana
- Region: Ashanti
- District: Kumasi Metropolitan
- Historic countries: Ashanti Empire
- Founded: 1680

Government
  - Type: Mayor–council
  - Metropolitan mayor: Ofori-Agyeman Boadi

Area
  - City: 299 km^{2} (115 sq mi)
- Elevation: 250 m (820 ft)

Population (2021)
  - City: 443,981
  - Density: 1,480/km^{2} (3,850/sq mi)
  - Urban: 3,490,030
  - Ethnicities: Asante; Dagombas; Mole-Dagbon; Ewe
  - Religion: Christianity; Islam; Traditional African religions
- Time zone: UTC
- Postal codes: AK000-AK911
- Area code: 032 20
- Climate: Aw
- Website: kma.gov.gh

Kumasi (Note: /kuːˈmɑːˈsiː/ koo-ma-SEE; Twi: Kumase) is a city and the capital of the Kumasi Metropolitan Assembly and the Ashanti Region of Ghana. It is the second largest city in the country, with a population of 443,981 as of the 2021 census. Kumasi is located in a rain forest region near Lake Bosomtwe about 200 kilometres (120 mi) from the national capital Accra. The city experiences a tropical savanna climate, with two rainy seasons which range from minor to major. Major ethnic groups in Kumasi are the Asante, Dagombas, Mole-Dagbon and Ewe. As of 2025, the mayor of the metropolitan is Ofori-Agyeman Boadi.

The city was the capital of the Asante Empire, which at its peak covered large parts of present-day Ghana and the Ivory Coast. After being taken over by the British in 1896, coupled with experiencing a fast population growth, Kumasi rapidly grew with improvements to its infrastructure, such as roads and the addition of railways. After Ghana gained independence in 1957, the city became the capital of the Ashanti Region. Kumasi remains the seat of the Asantehene. The city is often regarded as "The Garden City" after Maxwell Fry published his 1945 "Garden City of West Africa" plan for the city. Additionally, it is also due to the abundance of gardens and forestry in the city.

Kumasi is a commercial, economic, and trading hub in Ghana, home to the biggest market in West Africa: the Kejetia Market. The city is the centre of Asante culture, hence also being nicknamed "Osei-Krom" or simply "Oseikrom", along with attracting many visitors. The city is also home to numerous trade associations, such as the Aboabo Talia Producers' Association. Half of the country's timber processing takes place in the city. The Centre for National Culture, Wesley College of Education, and Komfo Anokye Teaching Hospital are all located in the city. The city is also home to an increasingly growing film industry, Kumawood, which mainly focuses on telling local-themed stories in the local language of Twi.

== History ==
=== Etymology ===
Kumasi derived from the Twi word Kumase, meaning "under the kum tree" in which kum meant "the tree" and ase means "under". The word was the name of an Okum tree in Kwaman, planted by Okomfo Anokye.

=== Early settlement ===
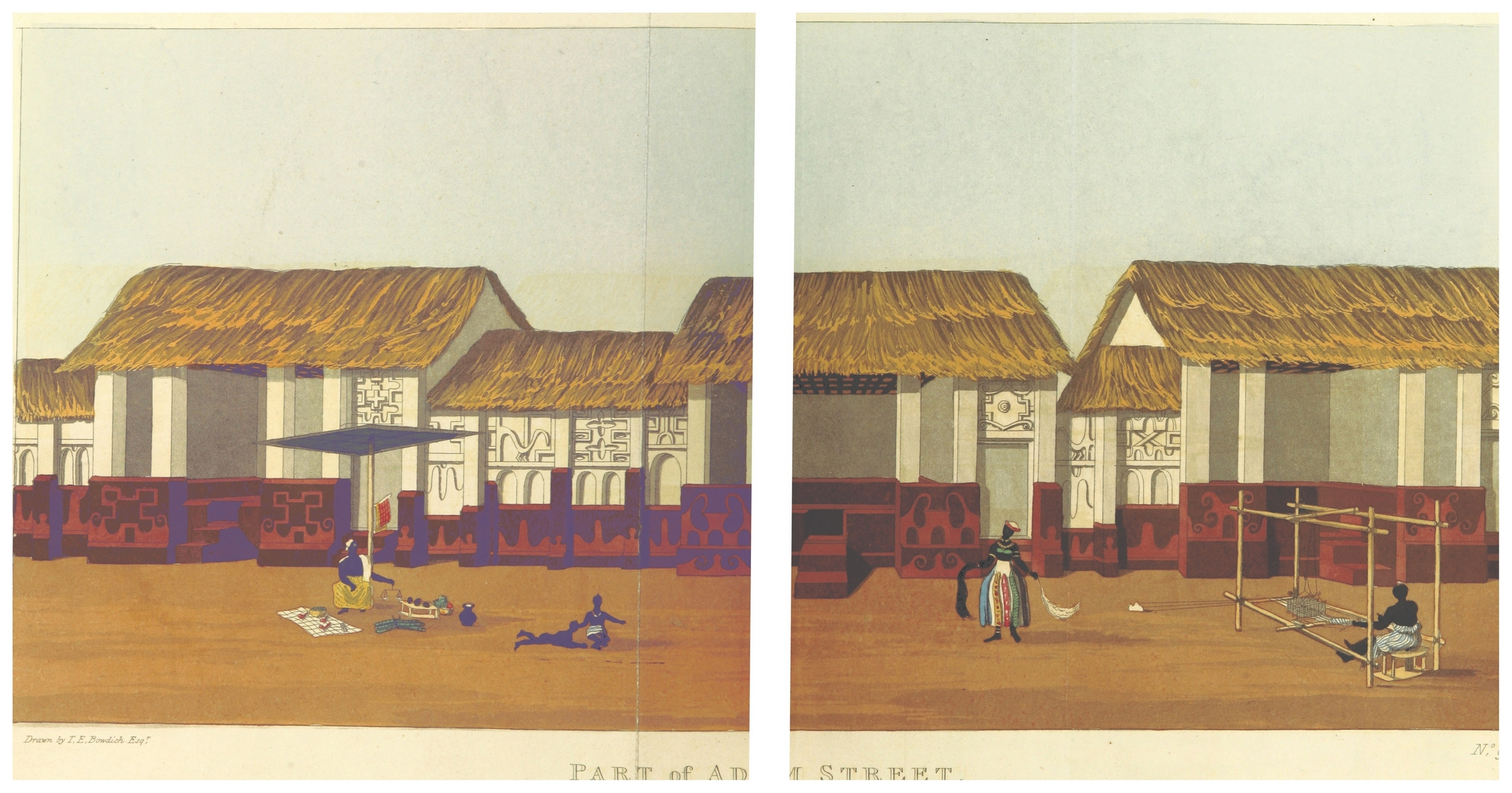
Kente weaver on Adum Street in Kumasi, Ghana, 1819

Kumasi was founded in the 1680s by Asantehene Osei Kofi Tutu I as the capital of the Ashanti Empire. Various accounts exist on the formation of the city. One states that Osei Tutu negotiated for the land under a Kum Tree, providing the origin of the name Kumasi. Other oral sources state it was Nana Oti Akenten who negotiated with the chief of Tafo for a plot of land under a Kum tree. Other traditions indicate that Oti built Kwaman and it was his son Nana Obiri Yeboa who created Kumasi instead. The majority of oral sources attribute the choice of site to Okomfo Anokye who was said to have planted two Kum seeds; one in Kwaman and another in Kumawu as he decreed that the one which grew would be designated as the capital of Osei Tutu's empire. Kumasi was built over the eastern slopes of a ridge, rising from the marshes of the Nsuben rivers.

=== Ashanti Empire ===
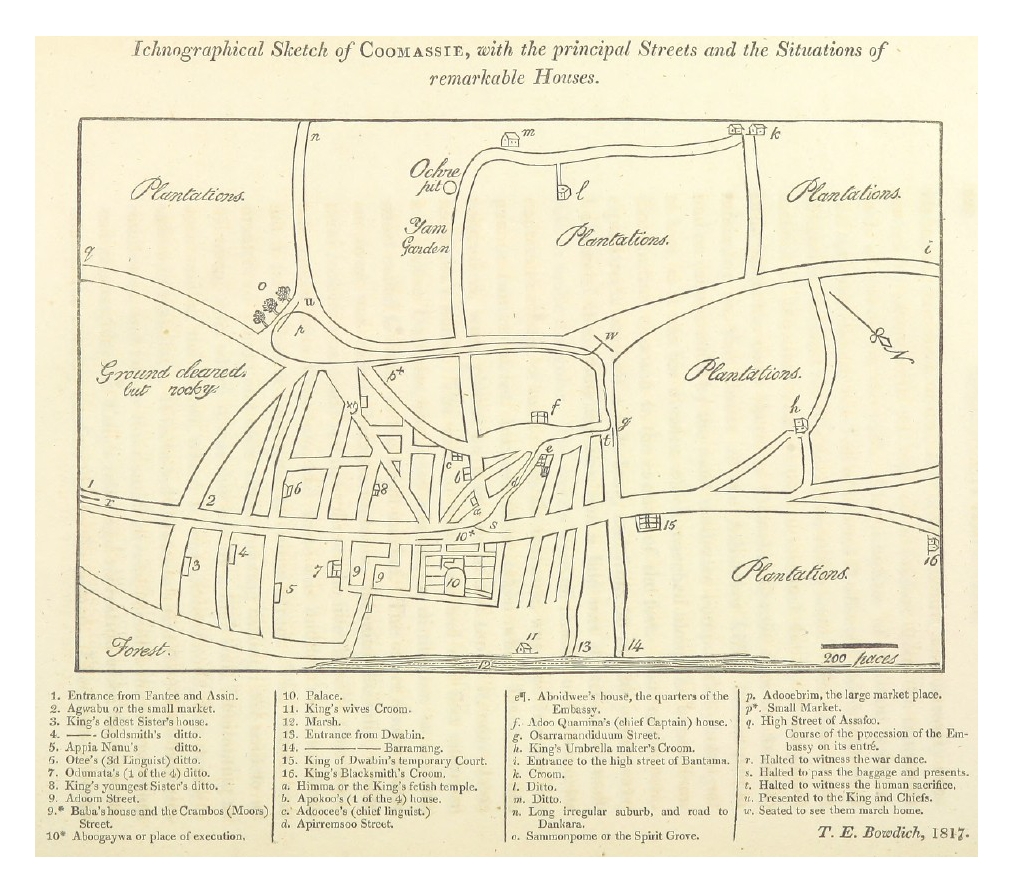
Bowdich's sketch of Kumasi c. 1817

Historical affiliations
- Ashanti Empire (1701–1901)
- Gold Coast (1901–1957)
- Ghana (1957–present)

The city rose to prominence in 1695, when it became the capital of the Ashanti Empire due to the activities of its ruler, Osei Tutu. The ruler of Kumasi, known as the Asantehene, also served as the ruler of the empire. With their 1701 victory over Denkyira, the Ashanti empire became the primary state among the Ashantis. In 1718–19, Aowin King Ebirimoro invaded Kumasi and sacked the capital. Asantehene Opoku Ware I was able to "beat back" this invasion.

European sources in the late 19th century mentioned the city's neatness such as the account of F. Boyle in 1874 who stated that Kumasi's smells "are never those of sewage", as well as Brackenbury, who wrote around 1873 that "the streets are generally very broad and clean, and ornamented with many beautiful banyan-trees affording grateful shade from the powerful rays of the sun." In contrast, William Butler described the city as "a filthier and far more blood-stained collection of mud and wattle hovels than any other village in the forest." Parts of the city, including the then royal residence, were burnt by the British in the Third Anglo-Ashanti War of 1874.

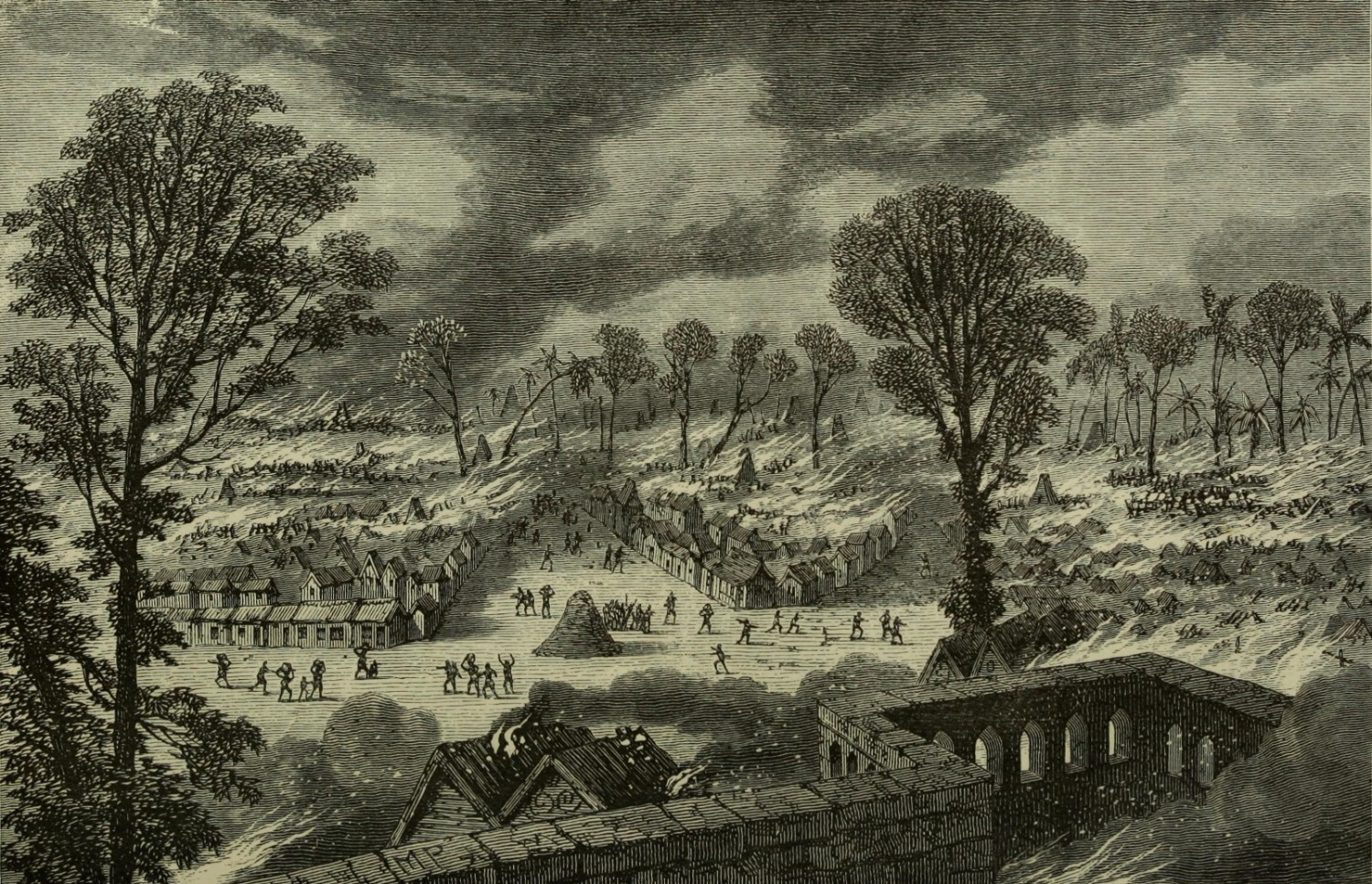
Burning of Kumasi in 1874 depicted by Henry Morton Stanley

In 1888, R. Austin Freeman was disappointed with the ruins of Kumasi following the British destruction in 1874 and the Ashanti civil war before 1888.

Kumasi was a great disappointment to me, and my disappointment increased as I walked round and examined the town. It was not merely that so little existed, but that so much had been destroyed. As it stands, or then stood, the town was nothing more than a large clearing in the forest, over which were scattered, somewhat irregularly, groups of houses. The paths were dirty and ill kept, and between the groups of houses large patches of waste ground intervened, and on these, amidst the tall, coarse grass that covered them, were to be seen the remains of houses that had once occupied them. These houses once stood in wide and regular streets, but since the destruction of the city in 1874 the natives do not seem to have had heart to rebuild them. Yet there remained some few vestiges to show what Kumasi had been in its palmy days... A few broad, well-kept streets still existed, lined by houses, [of] ... admirable construction, careful and artistic finish and excellent repair...

— R. Austin Freeman.

Kumasi's population during the time of the Ashanti Empire varied. In the early 19th century, Ashanti sources estimated a populace of 100,000, while European sources gave a figure around 12–15,000. According to historian Ivor Wilks, the city may have had a population of 40,000 in the 1860s.

Lady Mary Alice Hodgson, the first English lady to visit Ashanti, wrote "The Siege of Kumasi", an account of the siege of the fort by the nationals of Ashanti and of the subsequent march to the coast. (She was the daughter of Hon. W. A. G. Young, CMG, former governor of the Gold Coast, and the wife of Sir Frederick Mitchell Hodgson, KCMG, the governor of the Gold Coast in 1900.)

=== Colonial era ===
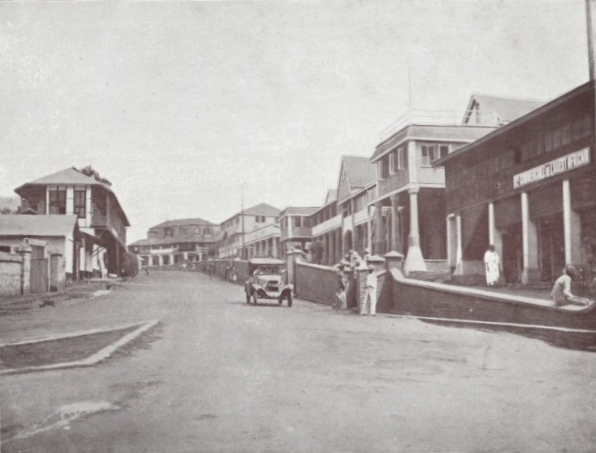
Kings Way Road in Kumasi (1925)

In 1926, following the return of the Ashanti King Prempeh I after 30-year in exile in the Seychelles Island, Kumasi was vested with ceremonial control over the Ashanti sub-states. The full role of king was restored by the colonial administration in 1935. The city holds an important place in the history of the Ashanti people, as legend claims that it was here Okomfo Anokye received the golden stool, an embodiment of the soul of Athe Ahanti nation.

== Geography ==
=== Metropolitan area ===
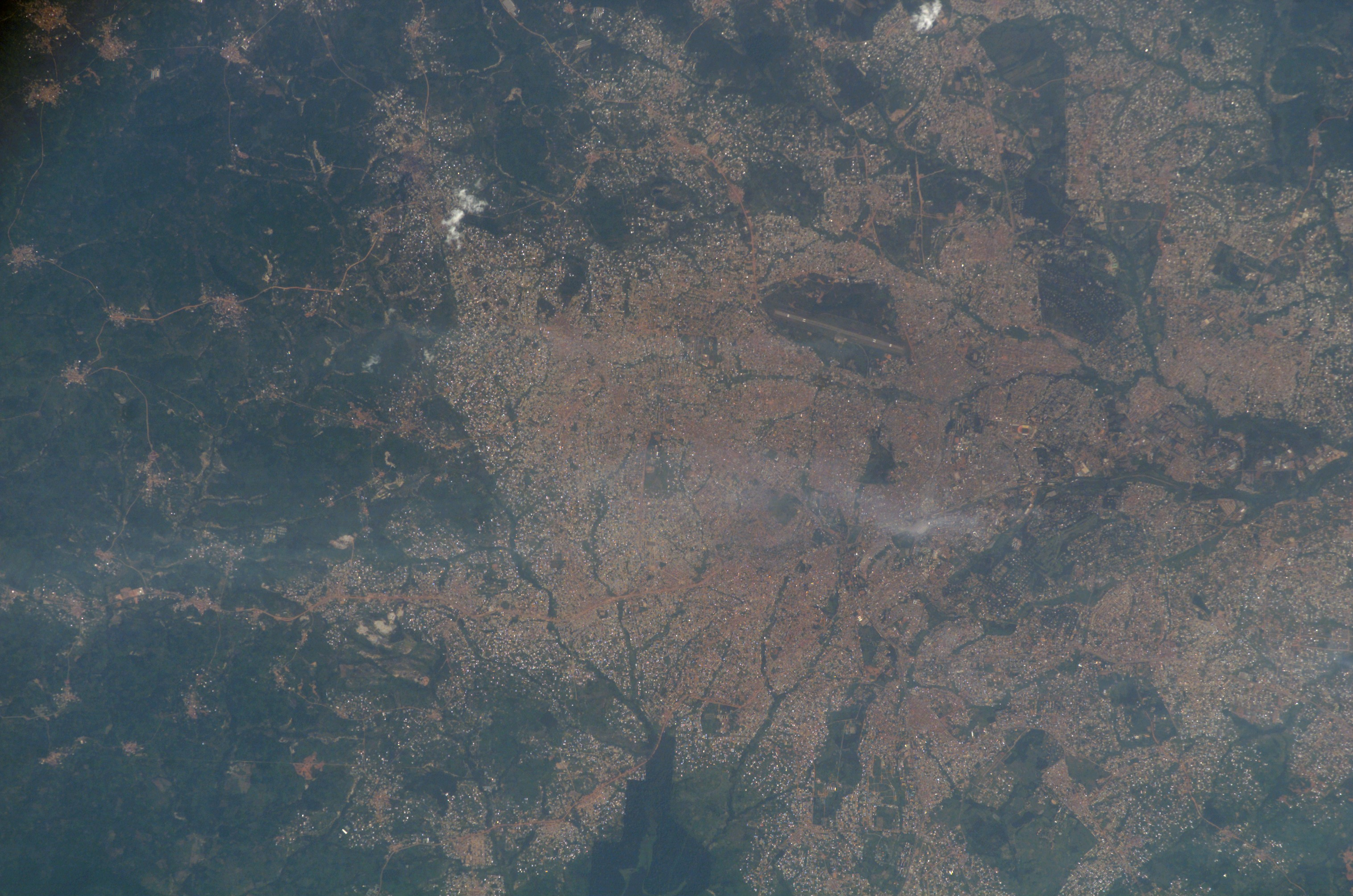
Satellite view of Kumasi Metropolitan taken during ISS Expedition 16

Kumasi is located in the Kumasi Metropolitan, one of more than thirty districts in the Ashanti Region. It covers a land area of 214.3 km^{2} (2.307×10^{9} sq ft) and is elevated 250 to 300 m (820 to 980 ft) above sea level. The metropolitan borders the Kwabre East Municipal District and Afigya Kwabre North District to the north, the Atwima Kwanwoma District and Atwima Nwabiagya Municipal District to the west, the Ejisu Municipal District and Asokore Mampong Municipal District towards the east and the Bosomtwe District to the south.

=== Environmental issues ===
Due to large amounts of encroachment, water pollution in the city is increasing, threatening rivers such as the Wiwi and the Subin. A 2024 report said that in the Kumasi Metropolitan, "more land alongside the rivers was being used for industrial, residential and commercial purposes than for green spaces." The researchers criticized that "city authorities were ineffective in controlling development in these areas" and recommended that "there should be a buffer of 100 feet (30 metres) along water bodies."

=== Climate ===
Kumasi has a tropical savanna climate (Köppen climate classification Aw), with two distinct rainy seasons, major and minor. The major season usually occurs from March to July whilst the minor season is from September to November. The annual rainfall clocks in at around 1,200 mm (3.9 ft) while the relative humidity ranges around 53% to 93%. The average monthly mean temperatures are around 31 °C (88 °F) while the monthly minimum temperatures are about 22 °C (72 °F). The highest temperature ever recorded was 40.1 °C (104.2 °F) on February 15, 2024.

Climate data for Kumasi (1991–2020 normals, extremes 1961–present)
Month	Jan	Feb	Mar	Apr	May	Jun	Jul	Aug	Sep	Oct	Nov	Dec	Year
Record high °C (°F)	37.5 (99.5)	40.1 (104.2)	38.5 (101.3)	36.4 (97.5)	35.2 (95.4)	33.9 (93.0)	32.5 (90.5)	32.6 (90.7)	33.1 (91.6)	33.9 (93.0)	36.0 (96.8)	36.5 (97.7)	40.1 (104.2)
Mean daily maximum °C (°F)	33.2 (91.8)	34.5 (94.1)	33.9 (93.0)	32.8 (91.0)	32.0 (89.6)	30.3 (86.5)	28.8 (83.8)	28.4 (83.1)	29.6 (85.3)	31.0 (87.8)	32.2 (90.0)	32.2 (90.0)	31.6 (88.9)
Daily mean °C (°F)	27.4 (81.3)	28.8 (83.8)	28.5 (83.3)	28.0 (82.4)	27.5 (81.5)	26.3 (79.3)	25.3 (77.5)	24.9 (76.8)	25.8 (78.4)	26.6 (79.9)	27.4 (81.3)	27.3 (81.1)	27.0 (80.6)
Mean daily minimum °C (°F)	21.7 (71.1)	23.1 (73.6)	23.2 (73.8)	23.1 (73.6)	23.0 (73.4)	22.3 (72.1)	21.8 (71.2)	21.5 (70.7)	21.9 (71.4)	22.2 (72.0)	22.6 (72.7)	22.3 (72.1)	22.4 (72.3)
Record low °C (°F)	11.7 (53.1)	11.2 (52.2)	17.8 (64.0)	18.8 (65.8)	18.8 (65.8)	18.2 (64.8)	17.2 (63.0)	16.1 (61.0)	16.7 (62.1)	15.6 (60.1)	13.9 (57.0)	10.6 (51.1)	10.6 (51.1)
Average precipitation mm (inches)	24.8 (0.98)	49.0 (1.93)	109.9 (4.33)	163.6 (6.44)	174.0 (6.85)	227.3 (8.95)	125.6 (4.94)	68.8 (2.71)	175.1 (6.89)	175.6 (6.91)	50.1 (1.97)	27.6 (1.09)	1,371.4 (53.99)
Average precipitation days (≥ 1.0 mm)	1.4	3.7	7.7	9.5	10.9	12.3	8.3	6.9	12.0	13.2	5.6	2.2	93.7
Mean monthly sunshine hours	178.5	177.4	187.8	192.3	191.5	135.2	98.8	75.9	93.7	159.4	196.2	180.5	1,867.2
Percentage possible sunshine	49	53	50	52	50	36	26	20	26	43	55	50	43
Average ultraviolet index	11	12	12	12	12	11	11	11	12	12	11	11	12
Source 1: NOAA
Source 2: Sistema de Classification Bioclimática Mundial (extremes 1984–1990)

== Cityscape ==
=== Urban planning ===
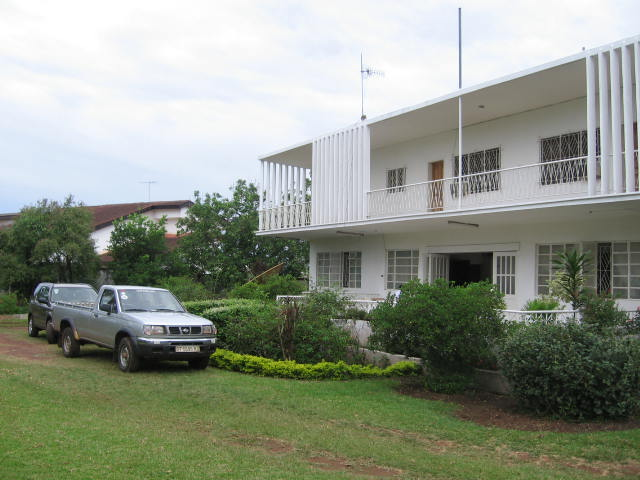
A detached house in Kumasi

Historically, the city was planned based on traditional land settlement patterns and land use systems of the Asante Empire. Although the city was not "formally" planned, it was considered to be well-organized with physical structures complying to the local culture and architecture. Some areas of Kumasi were declared sacred. At the time of Bowdich's visit in 1817, Kumasi was documented to have contained 27 streets. Another source in the mid-1880s identified 50 streets. In the present time, Kumasi is described as having unregulated informal activities, overdevelopment of slums, rapid urban growth, and poor services.

=== Housing ===
Housing types occupied by households in Kumasi (2010)
1. Compound (54.9%)
2. Detached (16.4%)
3. Semi-detached (8.70%)
4. Apartment (12.9%)
5. Other (7.10%)

Compound houses are the most popular style of housing in Kumasi, being able to house 8 to 15 households on average. A typical compound house is usually a one-storey building containing single rooms surrounding a square courtyard. They are usually built using low-cost construction materials and by local labour. A 1996 study found that approximately 20% of home owners actually own their homes and more than 60% are migrants, either foreign or from other parts of Ghana.

Aside from compounds, non-compound housing tends to be in the form of either bungalows or two-storey buildings set in substantially spacious plots or of apartment buildings. Additionally, there is also a small government sector of relatively small, single household dwellings. These non-compound types only constitute around 43% of houses. In 1986, only 12% of households (close to all of which were in non-compound housing) had toilets which was not shared with other households and 30% had no access to a toilet in the house. Owners have tended to have much better access to services that other tenure groups, where 46% have exclusive use of a toilet while only 14% has none.

== Government ==
Although Kumasi does not have a mayor on its own, the metropolitan it is located in and administrated by has a mayor–council form of government. The mayor (executive chief) is appointed by the president of Ghana and approved by the city council, the Kumasi Metropolitan Assembly. As of 2021, the current mayor of the metropolitan is Samuel Pyne.

=== Sub-Metros ===
The metro is split up into 10 sub-metropolitan areas: Manhyia, Tafo, Suame, Asokwa, Oforikrom, Asawase, Bantama, Kwadaso, Nhyiaeso and Subin. The metro is also split up into 5 health districts: Asokwa, Subin, Bantama, Manhyia North and Manhyia South.

== Demographics ==
Historical population
Year	Pop.	±%
1970	346,336	—
1984	496,628	+43.4%
2000	1,170,270	+135.6%
2010	2,035,064	+73.9%
2021	3,490,030*	—
*estimate Note: This does not count for the city of Kumasi, rather the metropolitan as a whole. Source: Ghana Statistical Service. (Note: Sources: 2000 census, 2010 census, 2021 estimate)

The population of the city of Kumasi is 443,981 people while the population of the metropolitan area is 3,490,030 people. One out of every five people in Kumasi are Christian, followed by Islam and traditional African religions. The largest ethnic group in the city is the Asante, followed by the Mole-Dagbon and Ewe people. Most of the population was born outside of the municipality, with about half being born outside the region.

== Culture ==
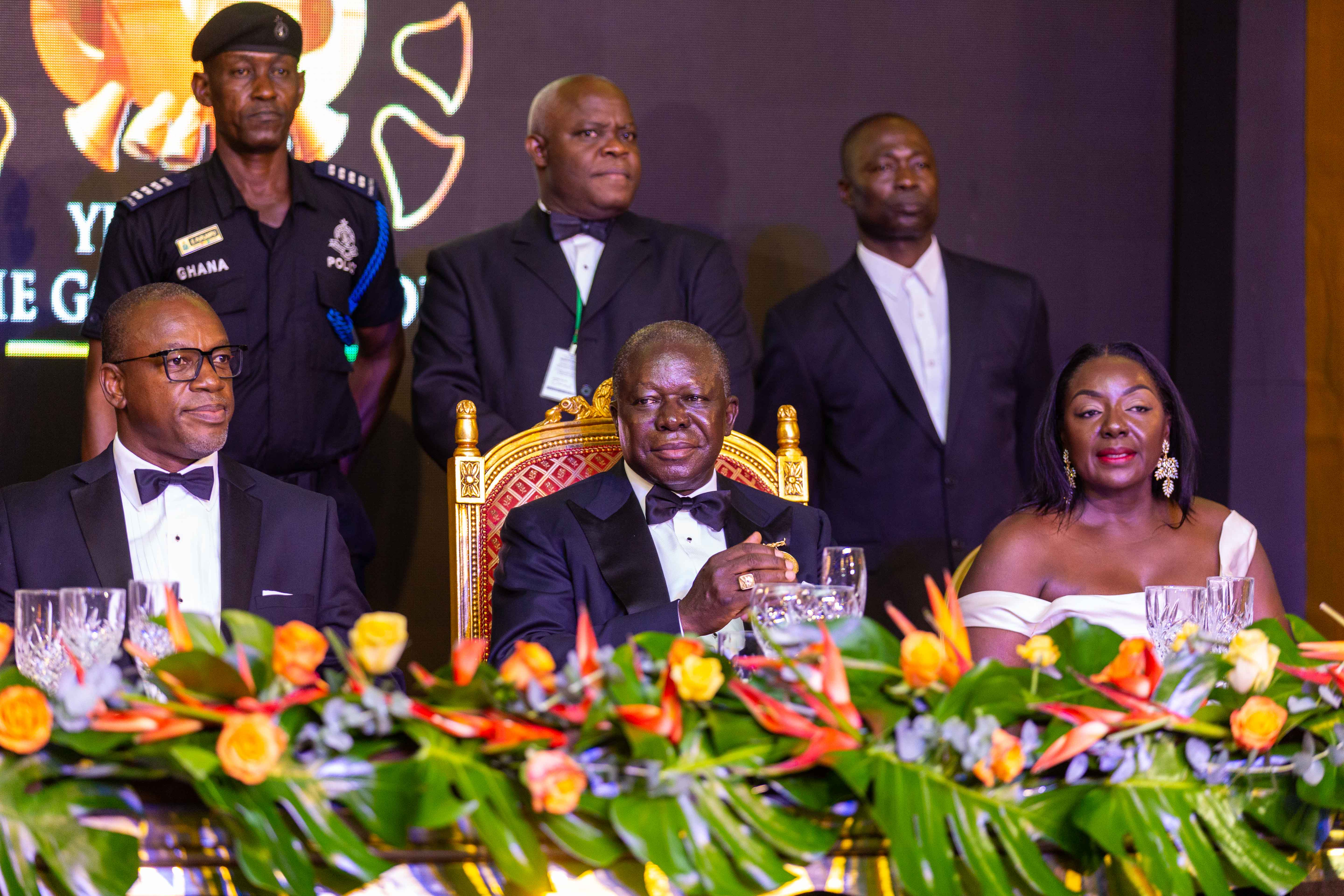
Otumfuo Osei Tutu II 20th anniversary celebration

Kumasi is the centre of Asante culture, helping it to be nicknamed "Osei-Krom" or simply "Oseikrom". Kumasi is also known for its traditional textile, kente, usually always made using traditional practices. It is home to the largest market in West Africa, the Kejetia Market, home to more than 10,000 stores and stalls. Places with cultural background(s) in the city include Fort Kumasi (built in 1896 to replace an Asante fort and now a museum) and the Nurom Hat Museum. Royal Asante attractions include the Centre for National Culture (including the Prempeh II Jubilee Museum with Asante regalia and a reproduction of the golden stool), the Okomfo Anokye Sword, the Asantehene's Palace (built in 1972), and the Manhyia Palace, dating from 1925, now a museum.

Kumasi includes a number of Orange Lodges in the region, including the Kumasi Orange Lodge No. 13, Osei Tutu Lodge No. 20, and the Morality Lodge No. 90. They are governed by the Grand Orange Lodge of Ghana. They focus on youth development, Orange heritage and history, and Christianity.

=== Media ===
Media in Kumasi is regulated by the Public Relations Unit of the Kumasi Metropolitan. In total, there are 36 media outlets in the metro; of these, four are television organizations, 20 FM stations, and 13 print media organizations.

==== Film ====
Film in Kumasi, Kumawood, is a rapidly growing industry appealing to those who lack access to education but have a passion for acting. The industry mainly focuses on local storylines, along with being set in village surroundings usually on a low budget ranging from $6,860 to $11,440, sharing similarities with Wakaliwood. The films are spoken in the local language, which is Twi.

The first documented movie theatre to open in Kumasi was the Rex Cinema, constructed in 1938. It was located at the Prempeh Assembly Hall, which was at the time one of the largest gathering places in the city. A second one was built in 1951, housed about 1,500 seats. These theatres were owned by the West African Picture Company, a Lebanese-owned business that operated in the Gold Coast, Nigeria, and London. Hindi films were popular among residents, more stably the Muslim populations.

==== Virtual stations ====
The following is a selected list of radio stations and TV stations in Kumasi:

AM

Note: The numbers in front of the tv station indicates the logical channel number (LCN)

- 29 Angel TV Kumasi (Angel Broadcasting Services Limited)
- 23 Light TV Santasi (Smart Multimedia)
- 44 Royal TV Kumasi (Royal Image Broadcasting Limited)

FM

- Adehye FM
- Nhyira FM
- Kessben FM
- Luv FM
- Metro FM
- OTEC FM
- Angel FM

== Economy ==
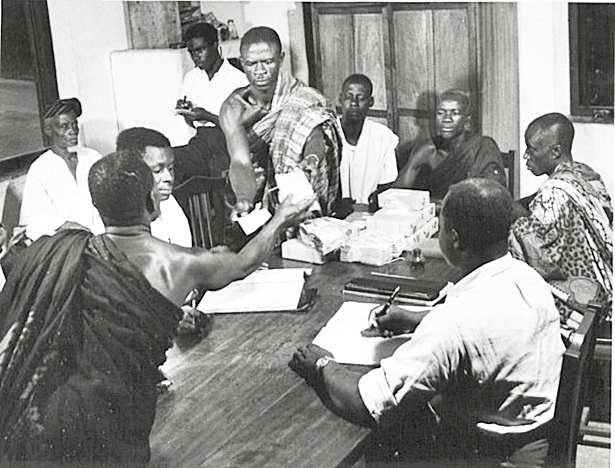
A meeting of the Management Committee of the Kumasi Co-operative Union related to cacao

The Ashanti Region accounted for 21% of the total national output of Ghana in 2014, of which 48% was situated in the city of Kumasi alone. This makes the city an economic centre in the country. Much of the city's wealth is derived from being the middle point of many of Ghana's main roads, along with cacao farming in the hinterland. The main occupations in Kumasi are professional, such as services and manufacturing.

=== Manufacturing ===
Since the 1960s the city has been home to many businesses, big and small, contributing to the city's economic growth. In fact, two-thirds of all non-household businesses in Ashanti was in Kumasi. Kaase and Suame are known as heavily industrialized areas, being the home for many mechanic shops and businesses, such as Guinness Ghana Breweries and a Coca-Cola Bottling Company United branch.

=== Energy ===
Nine out of every ten households are connected to the national electricity grid. Solar panels are prevalent in Kumasi and throughout the Ashanti region. Solar energy technology is a major energy source and contributor to electricity generation in the city. Other popular forms of power include flashlights, candles, gas lamps, and kerosene lamps.

=== Commerce ===
Much of the shopping and trading activity in the city takes place at Kumasi's shopping streets, in and around Kejetia Market and Adum. These two areas border each other. There is also heavy economic activities at Bantama and Asafo. Asafo in particular is the printing hub of Kumasi. Most of the printing done in Kumasi and Ashanti Region as a whole is done at Asafo. Kumasi's Ahwiaa (a sub-town in Kumasi) is also well noted for its wood carvings and arts.

==== Street hawking ====
Street hawking is a popular and ever-increasing economic employer in Kumasi, with a 2013 report finding that it appealed to people who lack formal education or the proper financial status to go into other economic activities. Common things that traders sell include water, bread, chocolate, plantain chips, chewing gum, books,puppies and many more.

== Infrastructure ==
=== Education ===
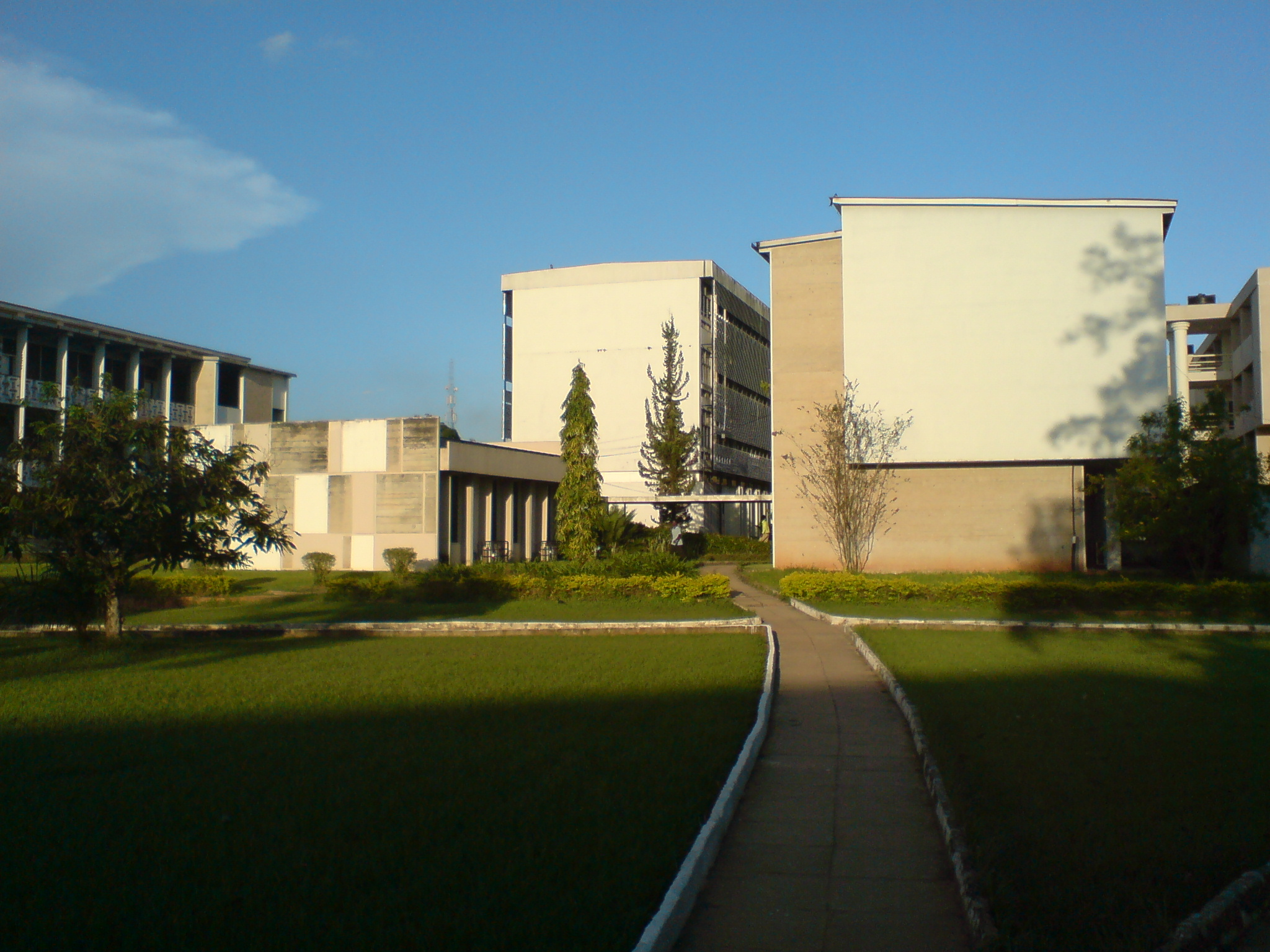
Kwame Nkrumah University of Science and Technology

There are a total of 2545 educational institutions in Kumasi, consisting of 919 pre-schools, 967 primary schools, 597 junior high schools, 52 senior high schools and 10 tertiary (post-secondary education) institutions as of the 2010 census.

==== History ====
After Ghana's got its independence in 1957, education surrounding teaching and research in Kumasi improved as a result of the nation's visions for the future. When the Kwame Nkrumah University of Science and Technology first opened as the College of Technology in Kumasi in 1952, it did not comprise with a school of architecture. The initial idea to create a school of architecture came from the United Nations-related "Report on Housing in the Gold Coast."

Advice was given by Robert Gardner-Medwin, professor of architecture at the University of Liverpool and Louis Matheson, professor of engineering at the University of Manchester to put in place two-year common course for all three departments of the envisioned faculty: Architecture, Building Technology, and Planning. Following their advice, the Department of Architecture in Kumasi admitted its first students in 1958. KNUST transitioned from a college to a university in 1961. Notable educators in Kumasi included John Owusu Addo and Austin Tetteh, both are architects.

==== Secondary education ====
There are elite all-boys and all-girls senior high schools such as Prempeh College, Kumasi High School, T I Ahmadiyya School, Opoku Ware School, Yaa Asantewaa Girls' Senior High School, Osei Tutu Senior High School and St. Louis Senior High School in Kumasi. There are also many elite mixed senior high schools such as Kumasi Academy and Anglican Senior High School, and a host of other public secondary schools, as well as their private counterparts in the city.

==== Tertiary institutions ====
The Kwame Nkrumah University of Science and Technology, Kumasi (formerly the Kumasi College of Technology) is the biggest university in the Ashanti Region and the first biggest in Ghana followed by the University of Ghana. Former Secretary-General of the United Nations, Kofi Annan attended this institution. A number of other public and private universities and tertiary institutions have since been founded in Kumasi, some of which are listed below.

Institution	Location	Private/Public	Affiliation
Kwame Nkrumah University of Science and Technology (KNUST)	Bomso to Anwomaso	Public	—N/a
Wesley College of Education	Tafo	Public	—N/a
St. Louis College of Education	Mmrom	Public	—N/a
Garden City University College	Kenyase	Private	KNUST
Christian Service University College	Santasi	Private	University of Ghana
Ghana Baptist University College	Amakom	Private	University of Cape Coast
Valley View University (Kumasi Campus)	Oduom	Private	—N/a
University College of Management Studies (Kumasi Campus)	Ayeduase	Private	—N/a
Christ Apostolic University College	Kwadaso	Private	—N/a
Kessben University (Kumasi Campus)	Asafo	Private	Akenten Appiah-Menka University of Skills Training and Entrepreneurial Development (est. 2020); Formerly: University of Education, Winneba (Kumasi Campus), Tanoso

=== Sports ===
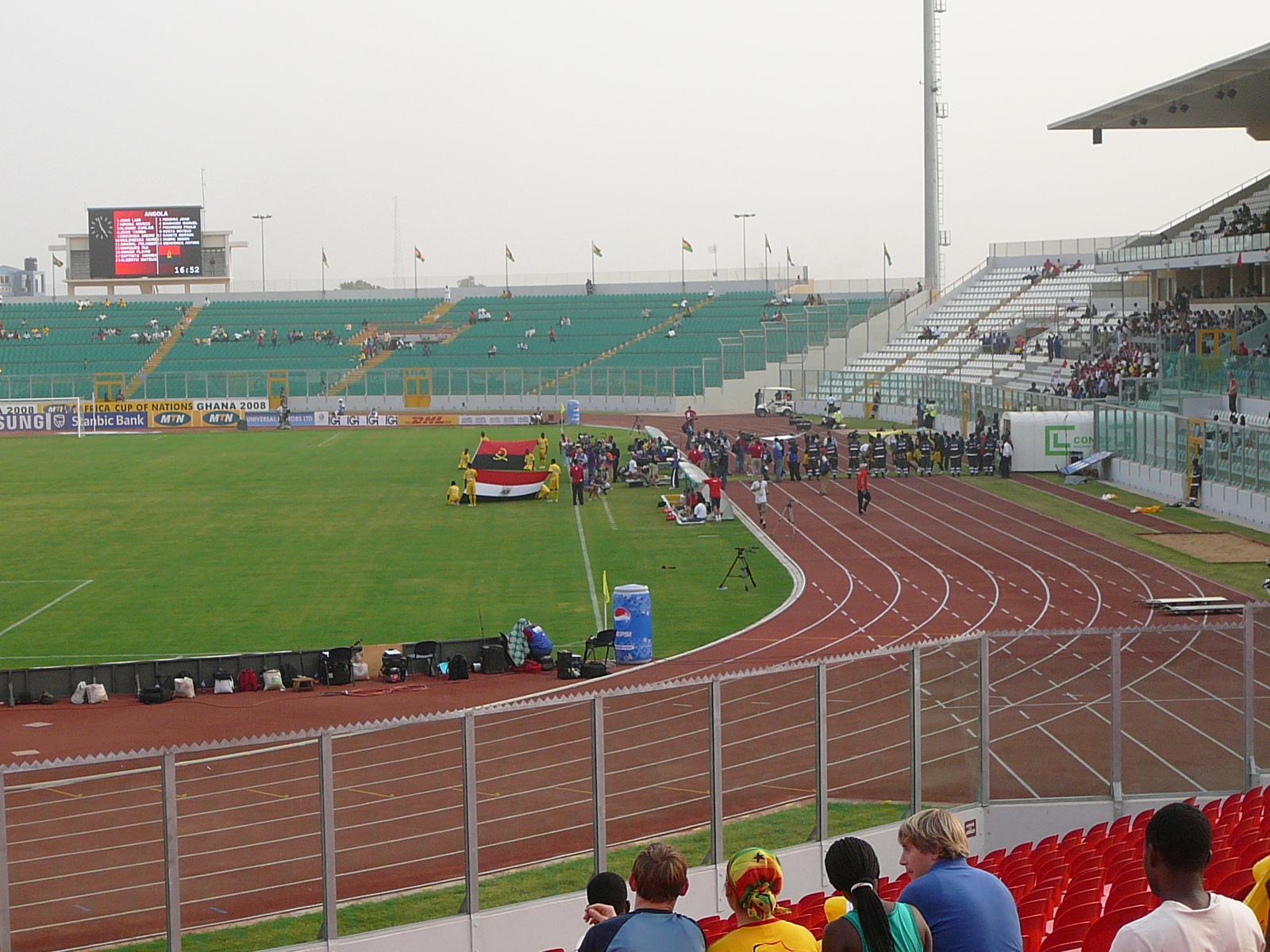
Kumasi Sports Stadium

The local football team, Asante Kotoko, has won several national and continental trophies and awards, and serves as a rival to the Accra-based Hearts of Oak. Their Kumasi Sports Stadium, also known as Baba Yara Stadium, was built in 1959, renovated in 1978, and again in 2007 with a seating capacity of 40,000. The city is also the home of the King Faisal Football Club, a premier division side. There is the Royal Golf Club, which has the Asantehene as president. Former Leeds United and Ghana national football team footballer Tony Yeboah and professional wrestler Kofi Kingston were born in Kumasi, by the real name Kofi Sarkodie-Mensah. The parents of Israeli Olympic sprinter, and 2022 World U20 Champion, Blessing Afrifah are from Kumasi.

=== Healthcare ===
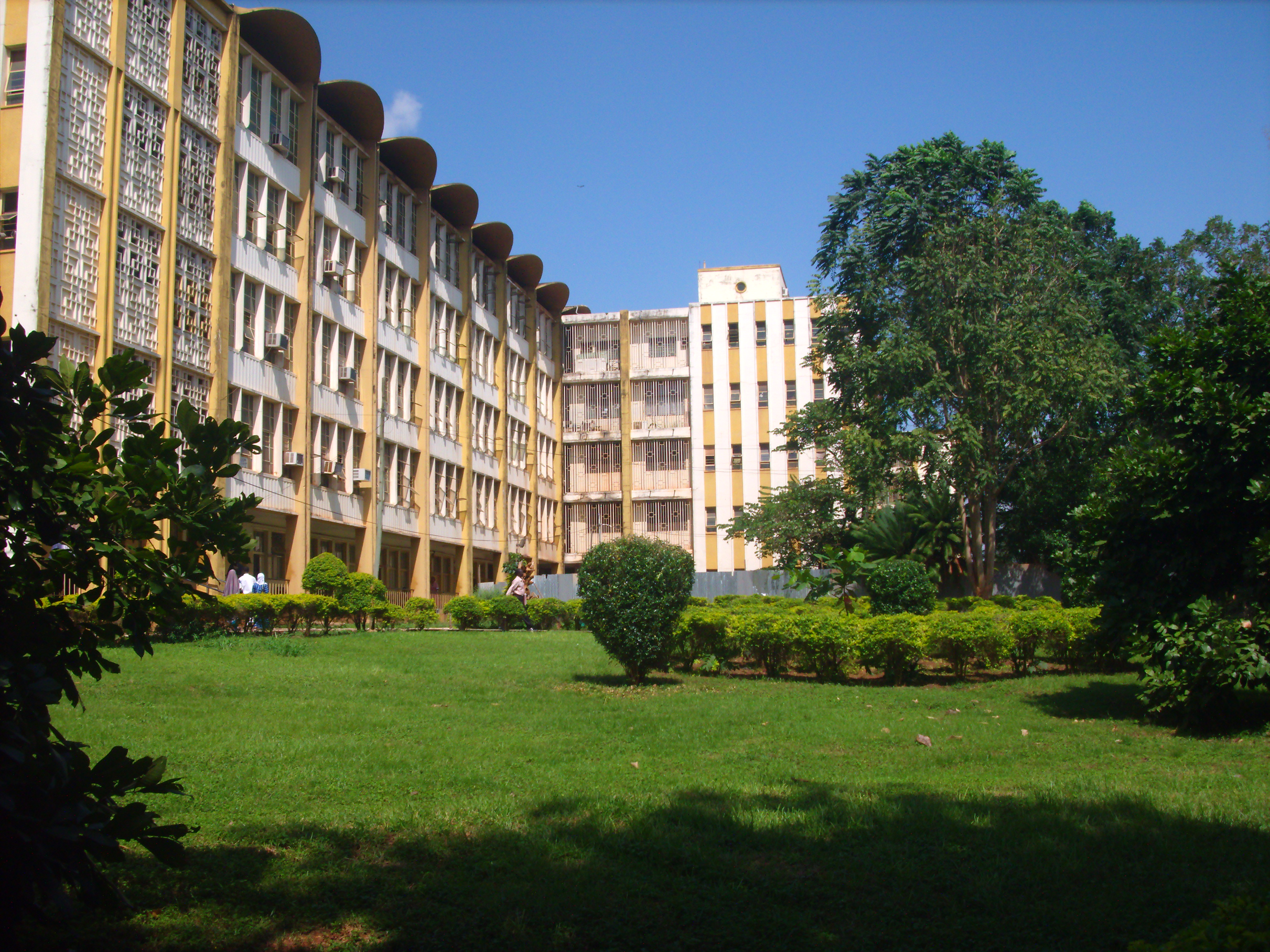
Komfo Anokye Teaching Hospital

The city is home to 136 health facilities, most of which are privately owned. The biggest hospital in Kumasi is the Komfo Anokye Teaching Hospital, which is located on a hill that overlooks the city. It is a 750-bed facility and is the second largest hospital in the country. The hospital opened in 1954 and was initially named Kumasi Central hospital. Nurses Training College and the Midwifery Training School, both built around the 40s and 50s, became a part of the hospital upon its completion, eventually becoming the Kumasi Nurses and Midwifery Training School. The city is also home to a hospital, the Kwame Nkrumah University of Science and Technology, which started construction in 2008 and was completed in 2023.

=== Places of worship ===
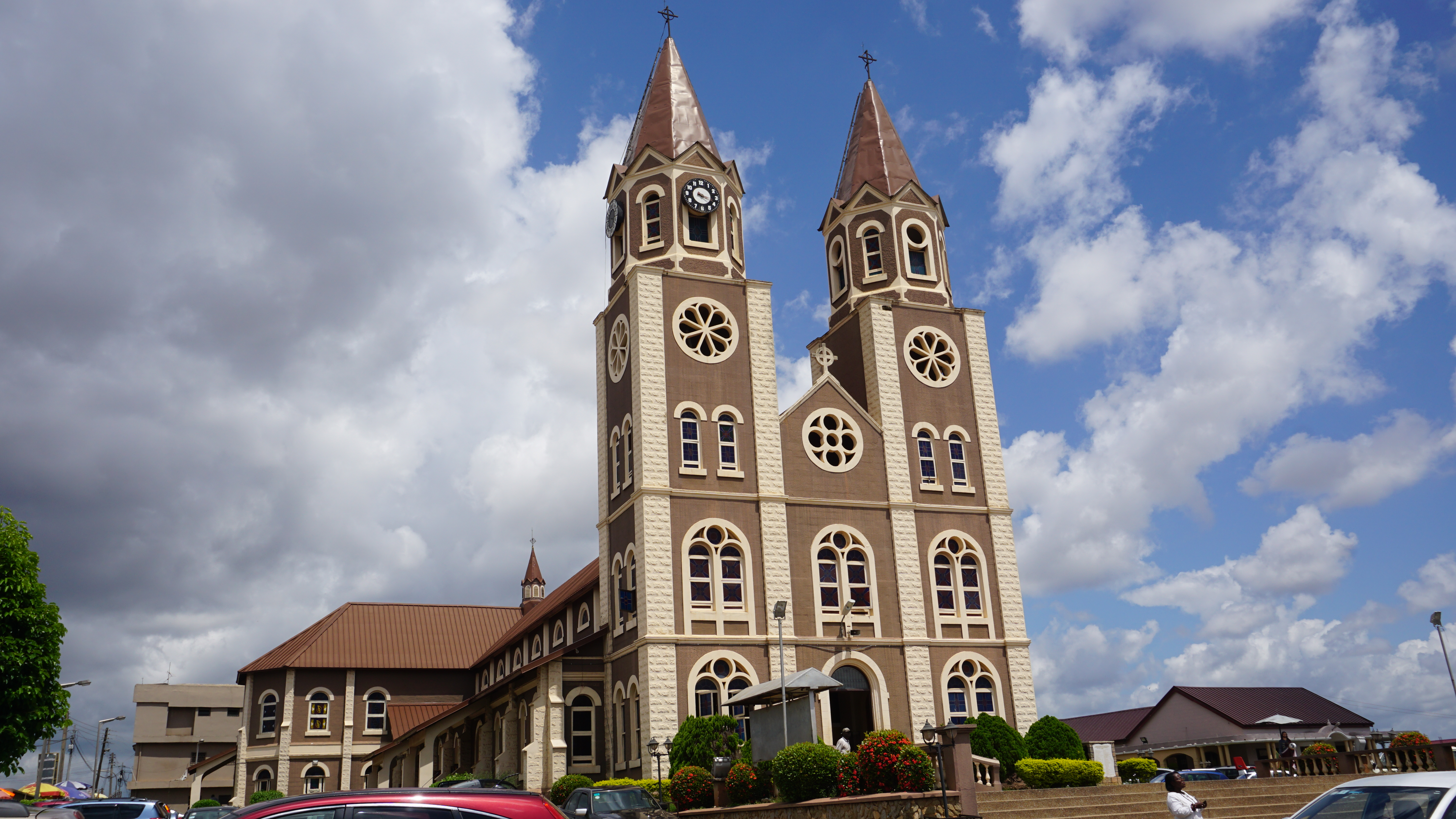
St Peter's Cathedral Basilica, Kumasi

The majority of the places of worship in Kumasi are Christian churches and temples. Places of worship in the city are as follow: Methodist Church, Presbyterian Church of Ghana, Church of the Province of West Africa (Anglican Communion), Seventh-day Adventist Church Evangelical Presbyterian Church, Ghana (World Communion of Reformed Churches), Christ Apostolic Church International (which was the first Pentecostal church in Ghana) Ghana Baptist Convention (Baptist World Alliance), Lighthouse Chapel International, Church of Pentecost, Assemblies of God, and Catholic Church Archdiocese of Kumasi (Catholic Church). There are also Muslim mosques, which include: Kumasi Central Mosque, Ahmadiyya mosque, Alhaj mosque, Kaase-Nhyiaeso mosque and Rahman mosque.

=== Recreational parks and gardens ===
Kumasi is one of the few African cities to adopt the Howard's Garden City Model. This is because in 1945, Maxwell Fry and Jane Drew designed the city's first ever development plan based on the ideals of Howard. The plan in questioned focus on the creation of green belts around the city and the proposals of the developments of many parks and urban green spaces in order to stop excessive sprawling and lower air pollutants. Although, studies showed that by 2003, a great proportion of greens spaces created in Kumasi has been converted to residential uses, due to urbanization and relatively weak land control in the city.

The city is also home to numerous recreational parks and gardens that are open to the public, with the per capita green spaces around 4.7 square metres (51 sq ft). Some major parks are Abbey's Park, Jackson's Park, Hero's Park, located on the same premises as the Baba Yara Sports Stadium, and Rattray Park. Although, the state of most of these parks are poor at best and are barely maintained. The city is also home to the Kumasi Zoo, also known as the Kumasi Zoological Garden, located at the heart of the city. It is operated by the Wildlife Division of the Forestry Commission of Ghana. The conditions of the zoo's facilities are poor and are in despair need for repair, according to locals.

An interesting fact about recreational parks in Kumasi is that a 2014 study by B. B. Amasa found that about 34% of the city's residents does not visit parks at all and does not understand the importance of parks. Furthermore, an additional study from 2014 by the same researcher found that 39% of its residents believed that parks were not necessary and should therefore be converted to other uses.

== Transportation ==
=== Air ===
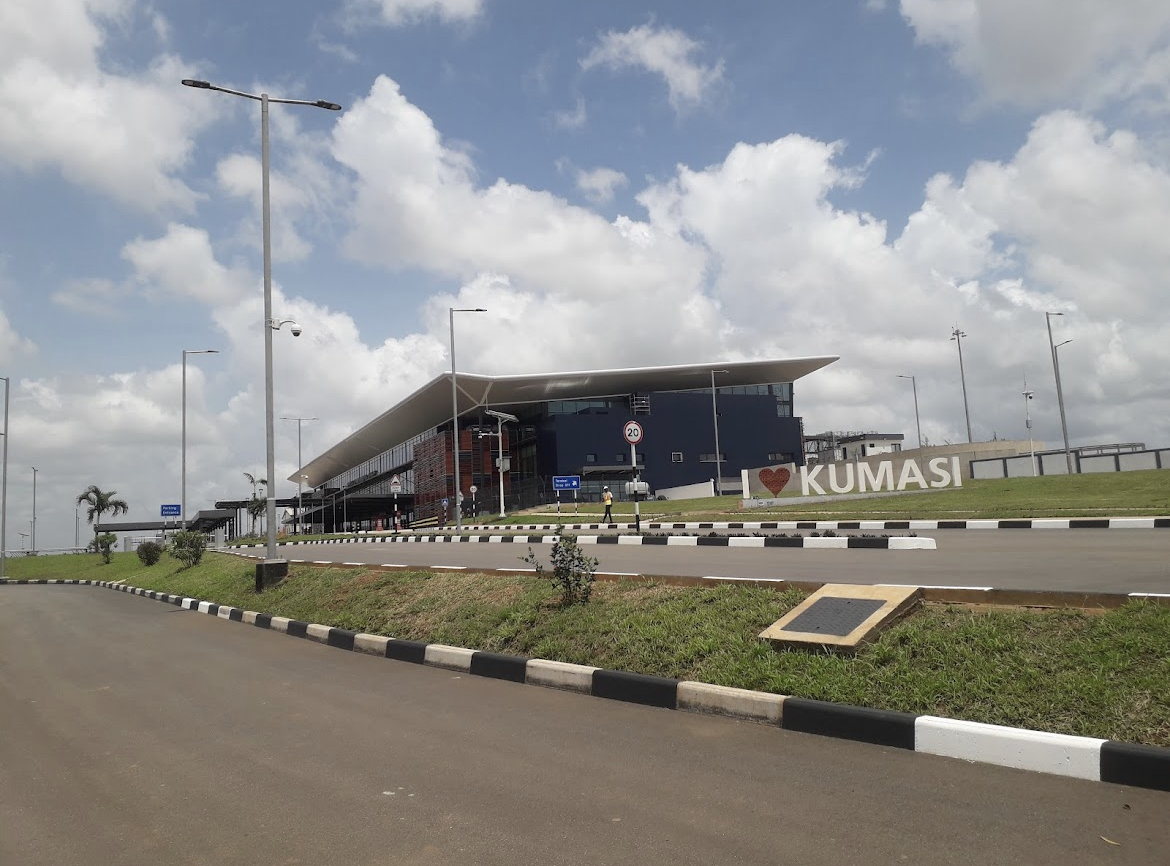
Prempeh I International Airport

Kumasi is served by the Prempeh I International Airport. As of May 2020, two airlines offered regularly scheduled flights to Accra. Airlines servicing the airport included Africa World Airlines and Passion Air. In 2013, the Government of Ghana approved expansion plans to the Kumasi Airport to service international flights into the region. The airport was renovated and completed by October 2022.

=== Road ===
==== Interchanges ====
The city is home to the Asokwa Interchange, an project that was a part of the Urban Environmental Sanitation Project Phase II. (Note: The Second Urban Environmental Sanitation Project is one of two projects in Ghana which started in 2004, closely connected to the World Bank's agenda to addressed needs of upgrading infrastructure and services in "developing countries".) The by-pass is one of three interchanges in Kumasi. In 2021, the Government of Ghana announced the construction of a four level stack interchange in Suame. It is currently on its first phase, which is expected to be completed by the end of 2024.

==== Bus and taxicab ====
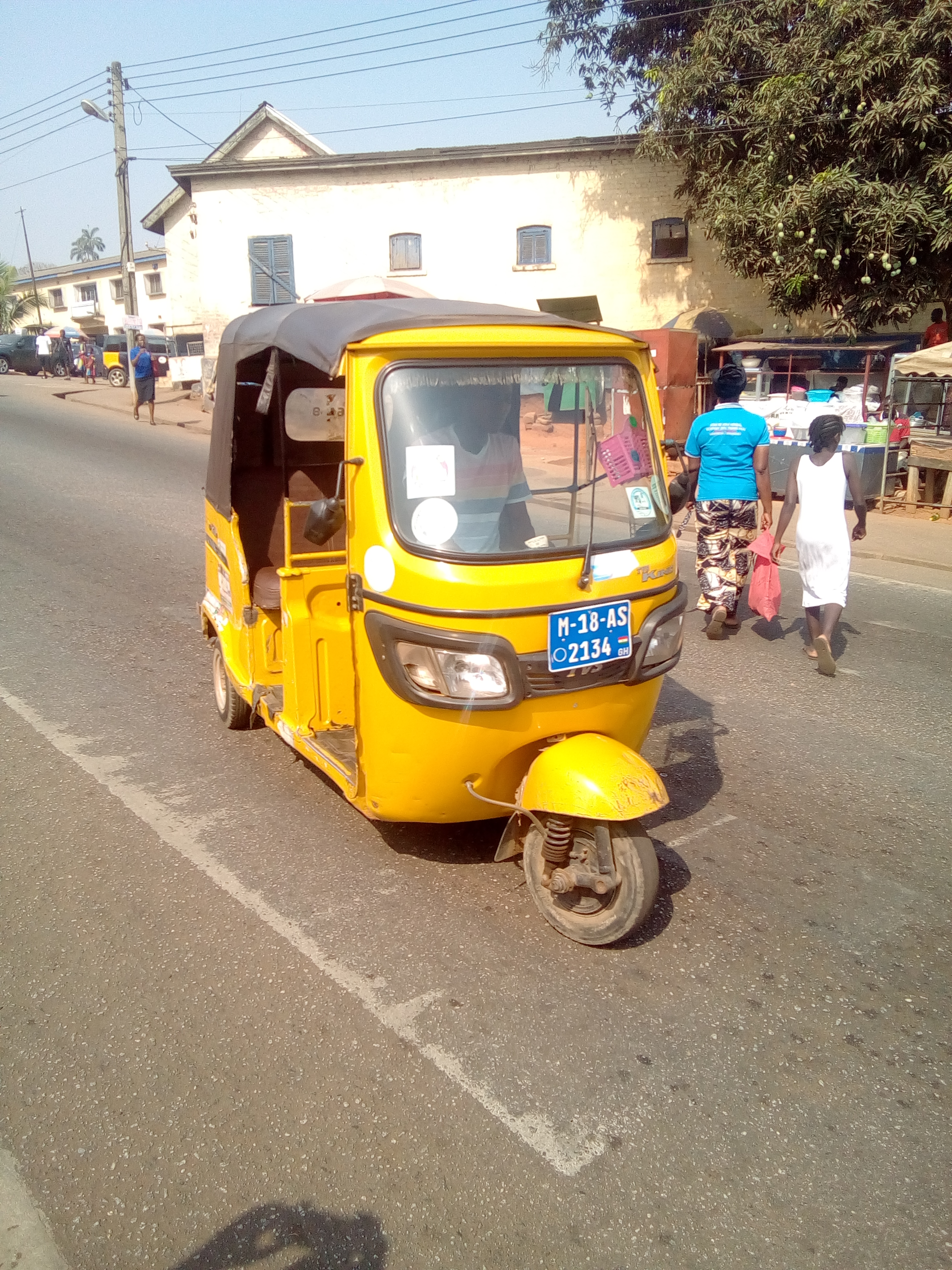
A tro-tro cruising on a road in Kumasi

There is public transportation from Kumasi to major cities such as Accra; Tamale, Mim, Ahafo; Cape Coast, Sunyani; Takoradi; Tema; Ho; Wa; Bolgatanga; Elubo; Aflao, Techiman. Public transport in the city is provided by transit buses, a mix of privately owned mini-buses known as tro-tros, taxicabs and buses. Tro-tros are usually converted mini-buses that run regular, well-known routes. Some taxis also run regular routes, which cost more but provide for a more comfortable ride.

In 2002, the city introduced the metro bus services, a rapid transit system for public road transport in Kumasi (MetroMass). This was to reduce congestion on roads and to make a larger and more organized bus routine system in the city. In 2017, Uber introduced services in Kumasi, a year after a successful introduction in Accra.

=== Rail ===
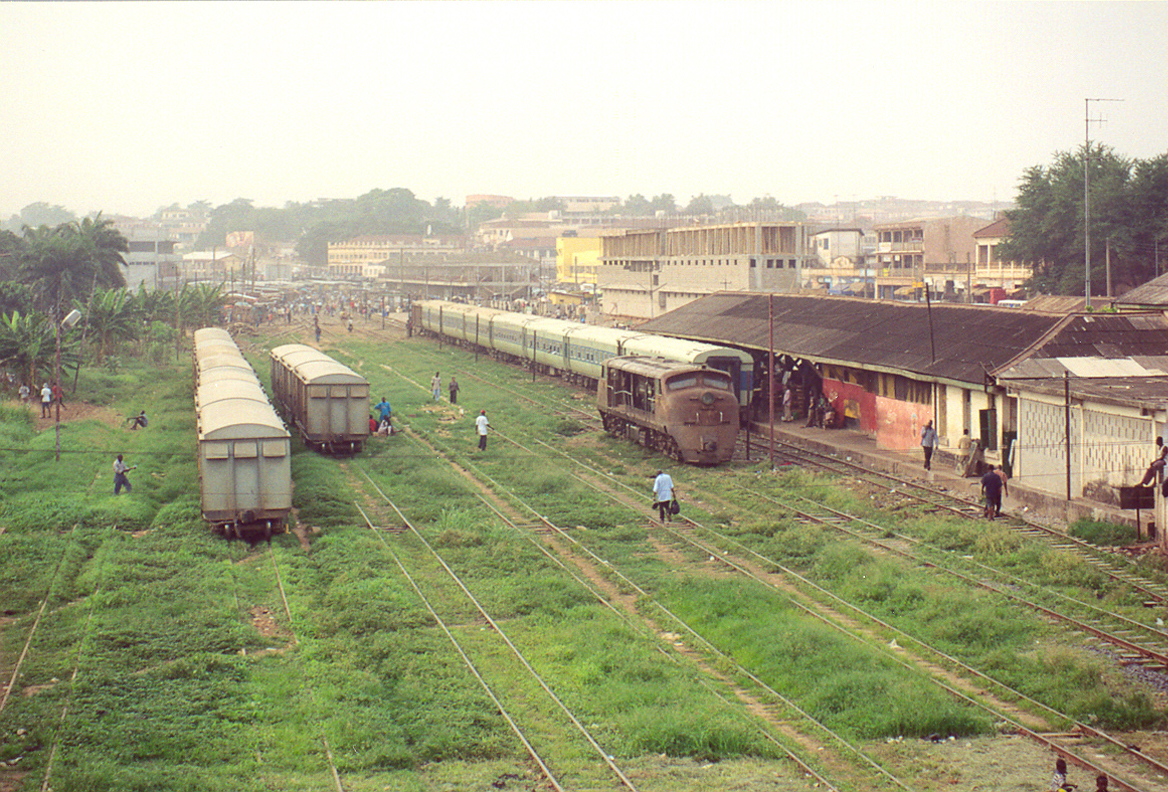
View of the Kumasi railway station in 2005

Kumasi is served by the railway lines to Sekondi-Takoradi and Accra. The train service has been suspended for several years because of damaged track, bridges and locomotives. Currently, no trains run to and from Kumasi due to the collapse of the railway corporation. A $6 billion project to upgrade the railways was due to get underway in 2011.

=== Port ===
Kumasi is located near the Boankra Inland Port, an inland port situated in the Ejisu Municipality. Construction at the port is situated into two phases, with phase one scheduled to be completed by the end of 2024. Once finished, more than 7,000 people are expected to be employed at the port, boosting overall productivity of the local economy.

== International relations ==
=== Twin towns – sister cities ===
The following is a list of settlements Kumasi is twinned with:

- Abidjan/Treichville, Ivory Coast (2004)
- Atlanta, United States (2010)
- Almere, Netherlands (2001)
- Charlotte, United States (1996)
- Columbus, United States (2008)
- Newark, United States (1999)
- Winston-Salem, United States (2001)
- Wenzhou, China (2016)

== Notable people ==
- Amerado, musician
- Kofi Annan, United Nations secretary-general (1997–2006) and co-recipient of the 2001 Nobel Peace Prize
- Chloe Asaam, fashion designer and textile waste advocate
- Kofi Kingston, Ghanaian-American professional wrestler, currently signed to WWE, born in Kumasi
- Shak Mohammed, footballer
- Mohammed Muntari, footballer
- Mohammed Salisu, footballer
- Philomena Nyarko, statistician
- Otumfuo Nana Osei Tutu II, monarch, current Asantehene of Asante
- Kwame Baah, music manager

== See also ==
- List of cities in Ghana
- Adabraka (Kumasi)
