= Ashwini Angadi =

Indian activist

- Awards: Queen's Young Leader Award
- Honours: Limca Book of Records

Ashwini Angadi is a global ambassador and advocate of disability rights. She is known for making education accessible to the underprivileged and disabled in India.

== Early life and education ==
Angadi was born to a marginalized family in Chellagurki, Bellary. She was born visually impaired, and relatives warned her parents that the child would be a burden and should rather be killed. Her parents persisted on raising her nonetheless. Angadi attended the Shree Ramana Maharishi Academy for The Blind. After passing 10nth grade, she enrolled at NMRKV College for Women to obtain her pre-university course. She struggled to keep up with students who had normal sight as the college does not provide Braille books. She also travelled 50 km away alone.

Angadi graduated with a B.A. from Maharani's College of Arts and Commerce.

== Career and advocacy ==
After graduating, Angadi began joining NGOs. She became a spokesperson for disability rights. She joined international forums to raise awareness on disability discrimination.

In 2014, Angadi established the Ashwini Angadi Trust to empower the disabled. On 6 June 2014, Angadi opened its flagship, Belaku Academy, to provide free education to the disabled and underprivileged. The residential school teaches science, computer and sports to children with special needs. They also teach practical life skills such as making their beds and toilet training. Cultural activities and visits to parks, temples and cinemas were also frequently held. Through Belaku Academy, Angadi aims to help the disabled make a living and become independent.

Angadi's team visits village councils to gather information on visually impaired children. They prepare a survey report and approaches the family of the children to discuss what they can offer.

== Awards and recognitions ==
On 12 July 2013, Angadi was granted the United Nations Special Envoy for Global Education's Youth Courage Award. In 2016, she was selected to be included at Limca Book of Records. Angadi is also a recipient of Queen's Young Leader Award.
