= Raphaelina Nakabuubi =

Ugandan radio presenter and journalist (1939–2025)

- Born: 1939; Nkoni, Masaka District, Uganda
- Died: August 16, 2025 (aged 85–86)
- Resting place: Nkoni, Lwengo District, Uganda
- Citizenship: Ugandan
- Occupations: Radio presenter, journalist, teacher, author
- Years active: 1959–c. 2010s
- Known for: Emboozi Yamaka (Radio Uganda); Ebirowoozo by’abatuwuliriza (CBS)

Raphaelina Nakabuubi (1939 – 16 August 2025) was a Ugandan radio presenter, journalist, teacher, and author known for her long-running family advice programmes like Emboozi Yamaka on Radio Uganda (now Uganda Broadcasting Corporation, UBC) and Ebirowoozo by’abatuwuliriza on Central Broadcasting Service (CBS).

== Early life and education ==
Nakabuubi was born in 1939 in Nkoni, then in Masaka District now Lwengo District, to Paul Bagampadde Kabuubi (father) and Eliza Nalukwago (mother). She trained as a teacher and taught in various schools in the Masaka area before entering broadcasting.

She started her education from St. Clare Primary School, Nkoni before joining Nkokonjeru Teachers Training School where she underwent a teaching course.

== Career ==
She began her radio career in 1959 shortly after qualifying as a teacher. She became especially prominent from the 1980s onward for educational and family-oriented Luganda programmes. On Radio Uganda's Blue Channel she co-presented and hosted shows that addressed everyday conduct, respect for elders, household matters, and community behavior. Later, at CBS, she continued similar work and rose to head of gender-based programmes.

She remained on air into her mid-70s and formally left the studio more than a decade before her death (around the early 2010s), though she continued to follow radio and occasionally contribute feedback.

== Death ==
She died on Saturday 16 August 2025 at the age of 86. She was buried in Nkoni, Lwengo District; the funeral Mass was led by the Bishop of Masaka, Sereverus Jjumba. Colleagues at CBS and other broadcasters paid tribute to her long service to radio, the nation, the Buganda Kingdom, and the Church.

== See also ==
- Radio in Uganda
- Uganda Broadcasting Corporation
- Media of Uganda
- Sandra Nabaggala
- Josephine Nabukenya
- Faridah Nakazibwe
