= Abrahim =

Abrahim is a surname and a given name, a variant of Ibrahim. Notable people with the surname include:

== Surname ==
- Warwick Abrahim (born 1990), South African cricketer
- Zahir Abrahim (born 1972), South African cricketer

== Given name ==
- Abrahim Simmonds, Jamaican advocate
- Abrahim Najmeddine, Moroccan footballer
- Abrahim Yango (born 1996), Liberian-born Australian footballer
