= Malewana =

Malewana is a surname. Notable people with the surname include:

- Annesley Malewana (born 1947), Sri Lankan musician
- Rakitha Malewana, Sri Lankan scientist
