= Chebet Lesan =

Kenyan entrepreneur (born 1990)

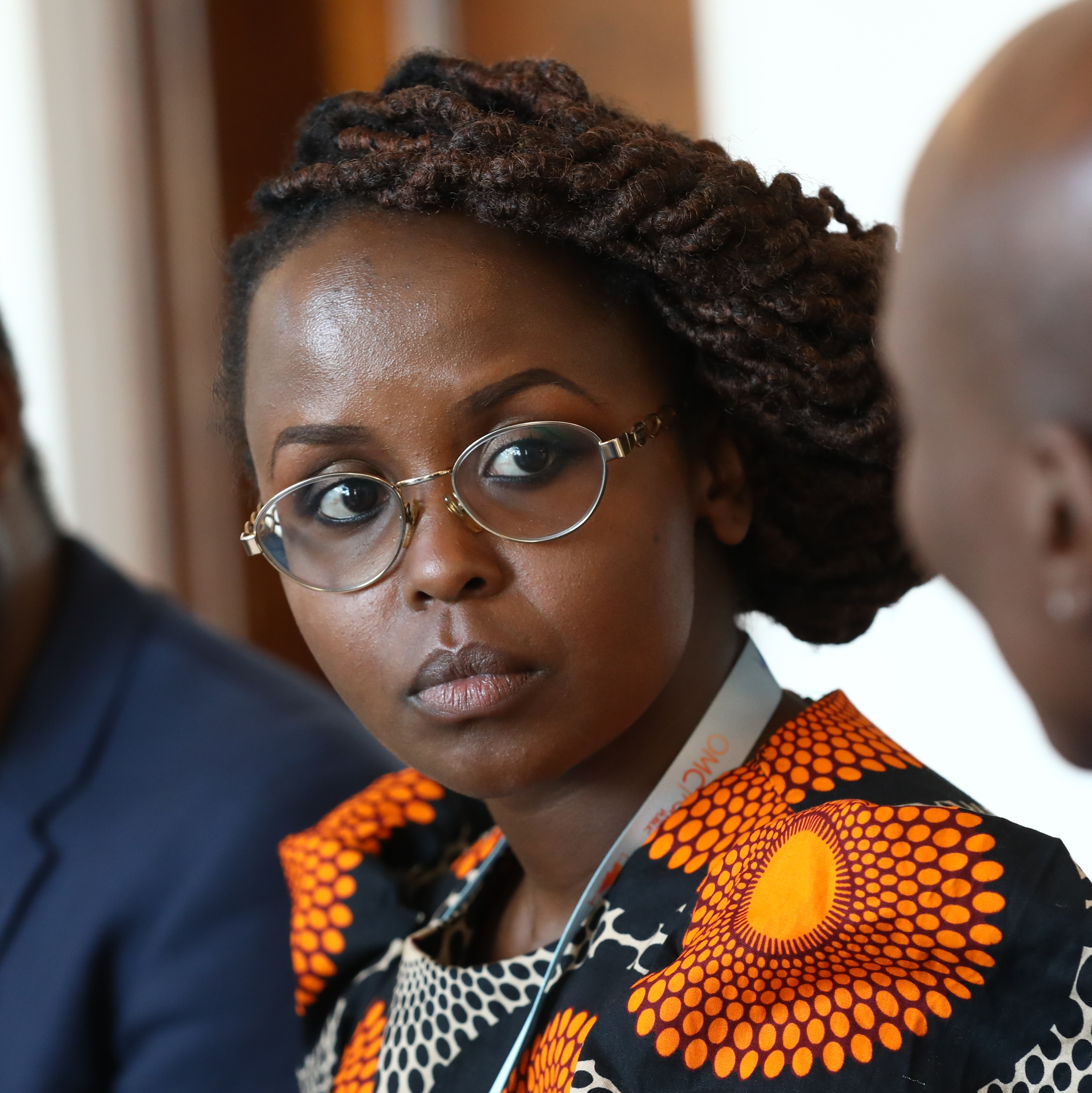
- at World Trade Organization meeting in 2019
- Born: 1989 (age 36–37); Kenya
- Education: University of Nairobi
- Occupation: Businessperson
- Employer: BrightGreen
- Known for: producing charcoal briquettes from waste

Chebet Lesan (born c. 1989) is a Kenyan climate activist and entrepreneur whose company BrightGreen creates charcoal briquettes from local waste materials, selling them through a network of women. Her awards include the Queen's Young Leader Award and a Mandela Washington Fellowship for Young African Leaders.

== Early life and education ==
Lesan was born in 1989. She attended the University of Nairobi, where she graduated in Industrial Design.

== Career ==
Lesan is a Mandela Washington Fellow. After seeing the loss of trees around Mount Kilimanjaro, she was inspired to make charcoal briquettes from biomass. The waste material used for the briquettes comes from sawdust or discarded flour. This waste is carbonised and the resulting material, called char, is pressed into briquettes with three different densities and heat output. Lesan's company, BrightGreen, sells the briquettes by weight (irrespective of their density), targeting them at normal consumers. Many consumers are living on $4 a day so the approximate charge of $0.55 per kilo is affordable. In 2017 the company had supplied 300 households in total with 100 tons of briquettes. Demand is high as Kenya has used up 98% of its indigenous forest, so fuel for cooking can cost $25 for a 35 kg bag.

Lesan's invention was estimated to have saved 800 tons of trees in Kenya by the end of 2017. Moreover, the briquettes burn with no smoke, meaning that they are less harmful than the smoke-filled hut she remembered her grandmother cooked in.

She chooses to distribute her fuel via women entrepreneurs who sell on the product. In 2019 the company was moving into profit; funds from competing in business contests like the Cartier Women's Initiative were targeted at extending the company's distribution area further.

In 2024 she was selected as part of the Africa Climate Ambassadors Programme together with Nthanda Manduwi from Malawi and Jennifer Uchendu from Nigeria.

== Awards ==
- Queen's Young Leader Award in 2017
- Mandela Washington Fellowship for Young African Leaders
- 2017 Scale-Up Fellow at MIT
- Cartier Women's Initiative 2019 finalist
- Africa's Business Heroes Awards 2022, 1st Prize Winner
