= Jennifer Uchendu =

Nigerian climate advocate

- Born: 10 August 1992 (age 34); Lagos
- Education: Covenant University; Institute of Development Studies
- Occupations: Researcher, climate advocate, sustainability expert
- Employer: Utrecht University
- Known for: Climate activist

Jennifer Olachi Uchendu (born 10 August 1992) is a Nigerian climate advocate, sustainability expert, and the creator of SustyVibes, a youth-driven initiative aimed at making sustainability understandable and achievable for Nigerian youth.

== Education ==
Uchendu was born in 1992 in Lagos, Nigeria. She obtained a degree in Biochemistry from Covenant University in Ota, Ogun State, and a master's degree in Development Studies from the Institute of Development Studies, which is part of the University of Sussex under the Chevening Scholarship She has been employed by Utrecht University to research eco-anxiety.

== Career ==
Uchendu's interest in the connection between young people, women, and taking action on climate change was sparked during her Master's studies, where she explored climate justice, art, youth, and eco-anxiety. It was also during this time that she began working with ONCA.

Her research into the mental health impacts of climate change has gained her work attention. Within her country there is anxiety about effects like flooding, although Uchendu has noted that several local languages lack words to describe climate change. Her work highlights the importance of climate change and its effects on health. She was one of the few African activists who attended COP26 in Scotland in 2021. She complained that not many African activists are able to attend COP events.

Uchendu's The Eco-Anxiety Africa project (TEAP) was founded in 2022 to protect Africans from climate anxiety.

In 2017, she co-authored the e-book A Guide to Business Sustainability in Nigeria.

In 2022, Uchendu was named one of the 'Top 20 Young Women in Sustainable Development' by Young Women in Sustainable Development. She was named as one of the BBC's '100 most influential and inspiring Women' in 2023 and in 2024 she was selected as part of the Africa Climate Ambassadors Programme together with Nthanda Manduwi from Malawi and Chebet Lesan from Kenya.
