= Rakitha =

Rakitha is a given name. Notable people with the name include:

- Rakitha Malewana, Sri Lankan scientist
- Rakitha Wimaladarma (1984–2012), Sri Lankan cricketer
