= Elizabeth Kite =

Elizabeth Kite may refer to:

- Elizabeth Kite (historian)
- Elizabeth Kite (activist)
