= Queen's Young Leader Award =

Commonwealth youth leadership award

Queen's Young Leader Award was an annual award given in recognition of leadership skills by young persons between the ages of 18 and 29. The award was open to selected Commonwealth of Nations to recognize exceptional people or organizations who are making a difference in improving other citizen's lives. The program was established by the Queen Elizabeth Diamond Jubilee Trust, in partnership with Comic Relief and the Royal Commonwealth Society. The programme closed in 2019.

== History ==
The award was first established in 2014 and initially was approved to run through 2018. Nominations re-opened each June.

== Award recipients by year ==
=== 2014 ===
1. Kate Row of Australia
2. Emily Smith of Australia
3. Alicia Wallace of Bahamas
4. Shamir Shehab of Bangladesh
5. Donnya Piggott of Barbados
6. Denielle Neal of Belize
7. Khairunnisa Ash'ari of Brunei Darussalam
8. Alain Nteff of Cameroon
9. Mallah Enow Tabot of Cameroon
10. Joannes Paulus Yimbesalu of Cameroon
11. Melissa Kargiannakis of Canada
12. Aaron Joshua Pinto of Canada
13. Rosimay Venancio of Canada
14. Kellyn George of Dominica
15. Alzima Elisha Bano of Fiji
16. Leroy Phillips of Guyana
17. Ashwini Angadi of India
18. Akshay Jadhao of India
19. Devika Malik of India
20. Jerome Cowans of Jamaica
21. Nicole Nation of Jamaica
22. Abdikadir Aden Hassan of Kenya
23. Samuel Karuita of Kenya
24. Caren Nelima Odanga of Kenya
25. Mohammad Yaaseen Edoo of Mauritius
26. Barkha Mossae of Mauritius
27. Karuna Rana of Mauritius
28. Tanyaradzwa Daringo of Namibia
29. Tabitha Besley of New Zealand
30. Oladipupo Ajiroba of Nigeria
31. Nkechikwu Azinge of Nigeria
32. Kelvin Ogholi of Nigeria
33. Isaiah Owolabi of Nigeria
34. Salman Ahmad of Pakistan
35. Christina J K Giwe of Papua New Guinea
36. John Taka of Papua New Guinea
37. Nadia Hitimana of Rwanda
38. Jean D’Amour Mutoni of Rwanda
39. Javon Liburd of Saint Kitts and Nevis
40. Kenville Horne of Saint Vincent and the Grenadines
41. Erna Takazawa of Samoa
42. Philip Cole of Sierra Leone
43. Christina Houaisuta Solomon Islands
44. Nosipho Bele of South Africa
45. Emma Dicks of South Africa
46. Patrice Madurai of South Africa
47. Thejitha Saubhagya Edirisinghe of Sri Lanka
48. Kavindya Thennakoon of Sri Lanka
49. Nondumiso Hlophe of Swaziland
50. Given Edward of Tanzania
51. Angela Benedicto Mnagoza of Tanzania
52. Teocah Dove of Trinidad And Tobago
53. Diana Nakaweesa of Uganda
54. Deo Sekandi of Uganda
55. Nicola Byrom of United Kingdom
56. Zoe Jackson of United Kingdom
57. Edmund Page of United Kingdom
58. Missack Willy of Vanuatu
59. Brighton Kaoma of Zambia
60. Regina Mtonga of Zambia

=== 2015 ===
==== Africa ====
1. Alain Nteff of Cameroon
2. Joannes Paulus Yimbesalu of Cameroon
3. Mallah Enow Tabot of Cameroon
4. Abdikadir Aden Hassan
5. Caren Nelima Odanga
6. Samuel Karuita
7. Barkha Mossae
8. Karuna Rana
9. Mohammad Yaaseen Edoo
10. Tanyaradzwa Daringo
11. Isaiah Owolabi
12. Kelvin Ogholi
13. Nkechikwu Azinge
14. Oladipupo Ajiroba of Nigeria
15. Jean d’Amour Mutoni
16. Nadia Hitimana
17. Philip Cole
18. Emma Dicks
19. Nosipho Bele
20. Patrice Madurai
21. Nondumiso Hlophe
22. Angela Benedicto Mnagoza
23. Given Edward
24. Deo Sekandi
25. Diana Nakaweesa
26. Brighton Kaoma
27. Regina Mtonga

==== Asia ====
1. Shamir Shehab
2. Khairunnisa Ash’ari
3. Akshay Jadhao
4. Ashwini Angadi
5. Devika Malik
6. Salman Ahmad
7. Kavindya Thennakoon
8. Thejitha Saubhagya Edirisinghe

==== Caribbean and Americas ====
1. Alicia Wallace
2. Donnya Piggott
3. Denielle Neal
4. Aaron Joshua Pinto
5. Melissa Kargiannakis
6. Rosimay Venancio
7. Kellyn George
8. Leroy Phillips
9. Jerome Cowans
10. Nicole Nation
11. Javon Liburd
12. Kenville Horne
13. Teocah Dove

==== Europe ====
1. Edmund Page
2. Nicola Byrom
3. Zoe Jackson

==== Pacific ====
1. Emily Smith
2. Kate Row
3. Alzima Elisha Bano
4. Tabitha Besley
5. Christina Giwe
6. John Taka
7. Erna Takazawa
8. Christina Houaisuta
9. Willy Missack

=== 2016 ===
==== Africa ====
1. Moitshepi Matsheng
2. David Morfaw
3. Paul-Miki Akpablie
4. Alex Mativo of Kenya
5. Peris Bosire of Kenya
6. Susan Mueni Waita of Kenya
7. Maletsabisa Molapo
8. Asante Mzungu of Malawi
9. Madalo Banda of Malawi
10. Deegesh Maywah
11. Drucila Meireles
12. Imrana Alhaji Buba of Nigeria
13. Olanrewaju Adeloye of Nigeria
14. Olumide Makanjuola of Nigeria
15. Nancy Sibo Rwanda
16. Angelique Pouponneau
17. Howard Nelson-Williams
18. Jessica Dewhurst of South Africa
19. Lethabo Ashleigh Letube of South Africa
20. Rachel Nungu of Tanzania
21. Josephine Nabukenya of Uganda

==== Asia ====
1. Osama Bin Noor
2. Kartik Sawhney
3. Neha Swain
4. Calvin Yoong Shen Woo
5. Safaath Ahmed Zahir
6. Muhammad Usman Khan
7. Zainab Bibi
8. Mark Jin Quan Cheng
9. Nushelle de Silva

==== Caribbean and Americas ====
1. Regis Burton
2. Firhaana Bulbulia
3. Shamelle Rice
4. Deidra Smith
5. Gunjan Mhapankar
6. Kelly Lovell
7. Tina Alfred
8. Ali Dowden
9. Tijani Christian
10. Tevin Shepherd
11. Trevis Belle
12. Dillon Ollivierre

==== Europe ====
1. Katerina Gavrielidou
2. Annabelle Xerri
3. Sara Ezabe Malliue
4. Adam Bradford
5. Ashleigh Porter-Exley
6. Ella Mckenzie

==== Pacific ====
1. Alexander Stonyer-Dubinovsky of Australia
2. Jacob Thomas of Australia
3. Luisa Tuilau of Fiji
4. Tabotabo Auatabu of Kiribati
5. Unique Harris of Nauru
6. Brad Olsen of New Zealand
7. Valentino Wichman of New Zealand
8. Seini Fisi’ihoi of Papua New Guinea
9. Nolan Salmon Parairua of Solomon Islands
10. Aiona Prescott of Tonga
11. Easter Tekafa Niko of Tonga
12. Mary Siro of Solomon Islands

=== 2017 ===
==== Africa ====
1. Chaikhwa Lobatse
2. Tobby Bond Njamngang
3. Efua Asibon
4. Elijah Amoo Addo of Ghana
5. Winnifred Selby
6. Chebet Lesan
7. Domtila Chesang
8. Towett Ngetich
9. Virginia Khunguni
10. Hilda Nambili Liswani
11. Nyeuvo Amukushu
12. Bukola Bolarinwa
13. Nasir Yammama of Nigeria
14. Kellya Uwiragiye
15. Yvette Ishimwe
16. Demien Mougal
17. Kumba Musa
18. Salton Massally
19. Aditi Lachman
20. Chantelle De Abreu of South Africa
21. Farai Mubaiwa
22. Nonduduzo Ndlovu
23. Favourite Driciru
24. Joel Baraka
25. Ruth Nabembezi
26. Alina Karimamusama
27. Natasha Salifyanji Kaoma

==== Asia ====
1. Rahat Hossain
2. Sajid Iqbal
3. Ankit Kawatra
4. Suhani Jalota
5. Heidy Quah
6. Syed Faizan Hussain
7. Yunquan Qin
8. Rakitha Malewana
9. Senel Wanniarachchi
10. Yeoh Hong Boon

==== Caribbean and Americas ====
1. Lia Kupiec Nicholson
2. Jamilla Sealy
3. Alexander Deans
4. Kevin Vuong
5. Eber Ravariere
6. Rianna Patterson
7. Michael Thomas
8. Samantha Sheoprashad
9. Abrahim Simmonds
10. Ajani Lebourne
11. Dion Browne
12. Matthew Batson
13. Siddel Ramkissoon

==== Europe ====
1. Eman Borg
2. Vladyslava Kravchenko
3. Alex Holmes
4. Usman Ali

==== Pacific ====
1. Abdullahi Alim
2. Jordan O’Reilly
3. Madeleine Buchner
4. Ashleigh Smith
5. Johnetta Lili
6. Theresa Gizoria
7. Karrie Jionisi
8. Elizabeth Kite

=== 2018 ===
==== Africa ====
1. Alimatu Bawah Wiabriga of Ghana
2. Derick Omari of Ghana
3. Shadrack Frimpong of Ghana
4. Douglas Mwangi of Kenya
5. Reekelitsoe Molapo of Lesotho
6. Chikondi Violet Mlozi of Malawi
7. Pilirani Khoza of Malawi
8. Mavis Elias of Namibia
9. Hauwa Ojeifo of Nigeria
10. Isaac Ezirim of Nigeria
11. Kennedy Ekezie-Joseph of Nigeria
12. Priscilla Ruzibuka of Rwanda
13. Anael Bodwell of Seychelles
14. Brima Manso Bangura of Sierra Leone
15. Siposetu Sethu Mbuli of South Africa
16. Thamsanqa Hoza of South Africa
17. Alice Ahadi Magaka of Tanzania
18. Isaya Yunge of Tanzania
19. Bazil Mwotta Biddemu of Uganda
20. Elizabeth Kasujja of Uganda
21. Stephen Katende of Uganda
22. Gift Chansa of Zambia
23. Sela Kasepa of Zambia

==== Asia ====
1. Ayman Sadiq of Bangladesh
2. Zaiba Tahyya of Bangladesh
3. Ahmad Fadillah Sellahhuddin of Brunei Darussalam
4. Aditya Kulkarni of India
5. Deane De Menezes of India
6. Trisha Shetty of India
7. Siva Nagappan Visvesvaran of Malaysia
8. Wen Shin Chia of Malaysia
9. Haroon Yasin of Pakistan
10. Hassan Mujtaba Zaidi of Pakistan
11. Mahnoor Syed of Pakistan
12. Efraheem Matthew of Pakistan
13. Tian Sern Oon of Singapore
14. Yi Jun Mock of Singapore
15. Bhagya Wijayawardane of Sri Lanka

==== Caribbean and Americas ====
1. Ronelle King of Barbados
2. Aditya Mohan of Canada
3. Ishita Aggarwal of Canada
4. Midia Shikh Hassan of Canada
5. Lakeyia Joseph of Dominica
6. Jenella Edwards of Grenada
7. Marva Langevine of Guyana
8. Aubrey Stewart of Jamaica
9. Jodie Dennie of St. Vincent and Grenadines
10. Benedict Bryan of Trinidad and Tobago
11. Jean-Claude Cournand of Trinidad and Tobago

==== Europe ====
1. Antonia Michailidi of Cyprus
2. Martina Caruana of Malta
3. Harry Phinda of United Kingdom
4. Leanne Armitage of United Kingdom

==== Pacific ====
1. Caitlin Figueiredo of Australia
2. Hunter Johnson of Australia
3. Lily Brechtefeld Kumkee of Kiribati
4. Alexia Hilbertidou of New Zealand
5. Ezekiel Raui of New Zealand
6. Petronilla Molioo Mataeliga of Samoa
7. Millicent Barty of Solomon Islands
8. Joshua Isikeli Sefesi of Tonga
9. Litiana Kalsrap of Vanuatu
