= Nushelle de Silva =

Sri Lankan art educator and social entrepreneur

- Born: Sydney, Australia
- Education: Ladies' College, Colombo
- Alma mater: Princeton University
- Occupations: entrepreneur, art educator
- Organization: Building Bridges
- Awards: Queen's Young Leader Award (Asia)

Nushelle de Silva is an Australian born Sri Lankan social entrepreneur and art educator. She is the founder of Building Bridges foundation in Sri Lanka.

== Biography ==
Nushelle de Silva was born in Australia and lived there until the age of seven. During her childhood in Australia, she was subject to racial abuse. Her family moved to Sri Lanka, when she was seven, where she continued her education at the Ladies' College in Colombo.

== Career ==
De Silva pursued her career as a social entrepreneur and initiated "Building Bridges" foundation in 2012. She developed the foundation with fellow activist Irfadha Muzammil. De Silva graduated from the Princeton University in architecture and in 2015 she received a Master of Science and Architecture from MIT.

In 2016 she received the Queen's Young Leader Award (Asia), for her notable work with peace and reconciliation projects through the Building Bridges foundation, particularly in the war affected Jaffna area. Nushelle also appeared on the inaugural edition of the Forbes magazine's 30 Under 30 Asia list in 2016 for her notable achievements in the field of social entrepreneurship, the only Sri Lankan, to date, to appear on the list.

In March 2019, she was acknowledged as one of twelve female change-makers in Sri Lanka by the parliament, coinciding with International Women's Day.
