= Hauwa Ojeifo =

Nigerian sexual violence and mental health activist

- Born: Nigeria
- Citizenship: Nigerian
- Occupations: Mental health advocate, Speaker
- Organization: She Writes Woman
- Known for: Founder of She Writes Woman; mental health advocacy in Nigeria
- Title: Founder and Executive Director, She Writes Woman
- Awards: Queen's Young Leader Award (2018)

Hauwa Ojeifo (born 1992) popularly known as "The Voice of Mental Health" is a Nigerian sexual violence and mental health activist. She is the first person in Nigeria with a mental health condition to speak out in the Nigerian parliament about mental health rights and the first Nigerian female to have received a Queen's Young Leader Award for her work. She is the founder of She Writes Woman, a nonprofit organization working to give mental health a voice in Nigeria.

== Early life and education ==
Ojeifo attended the University of Reading in England where she acquired a Master of Science degree in Investment Banking and Islamic Finance.

== Career ==
Hauwa Ojeifo struggled with mood swings and trauma from sexual and emotional abuse, which affected her life after she was raped at the age of 21. In February 2016, doctors diagnosed⁣⁣ her with bipolar and post traumatic stress disorder with mild psychosis, and she attempted suicide. She sought help from a psychiatrist and started a blog to share her story and help others. She also founded She Writes Woman. Through her foundation, she provides support to sexual abuse victims and people in West Africa who need mental health care.

In February 2020, Hauwa Ojeifo made history by being the first person with a mental health condition to speak before the National Assembly Committee on Health, helping to push for a mental health bill.

== Awards and achievements ==
Aside receiving a Queen's Young Leader Award for her work in 2018, Ojeifo has won several other awards including the following:

- In 2017, Ojeifo was honoured as the Possibilities Woman 2017 by IWOW
- She was also selected as an honouree of the AstraZeneca Young Health Programme scholarship to the One Young World summit in The Hague, Netherlands
- In 2018, she was awarded the MTV EMA Generation Change Award in Bilbao, Spain.
- In 2019, She became an Obama Foundation Leader.
