= Yvette Ishimwe =

Rwandan entrepreneur, activist (born 1996)

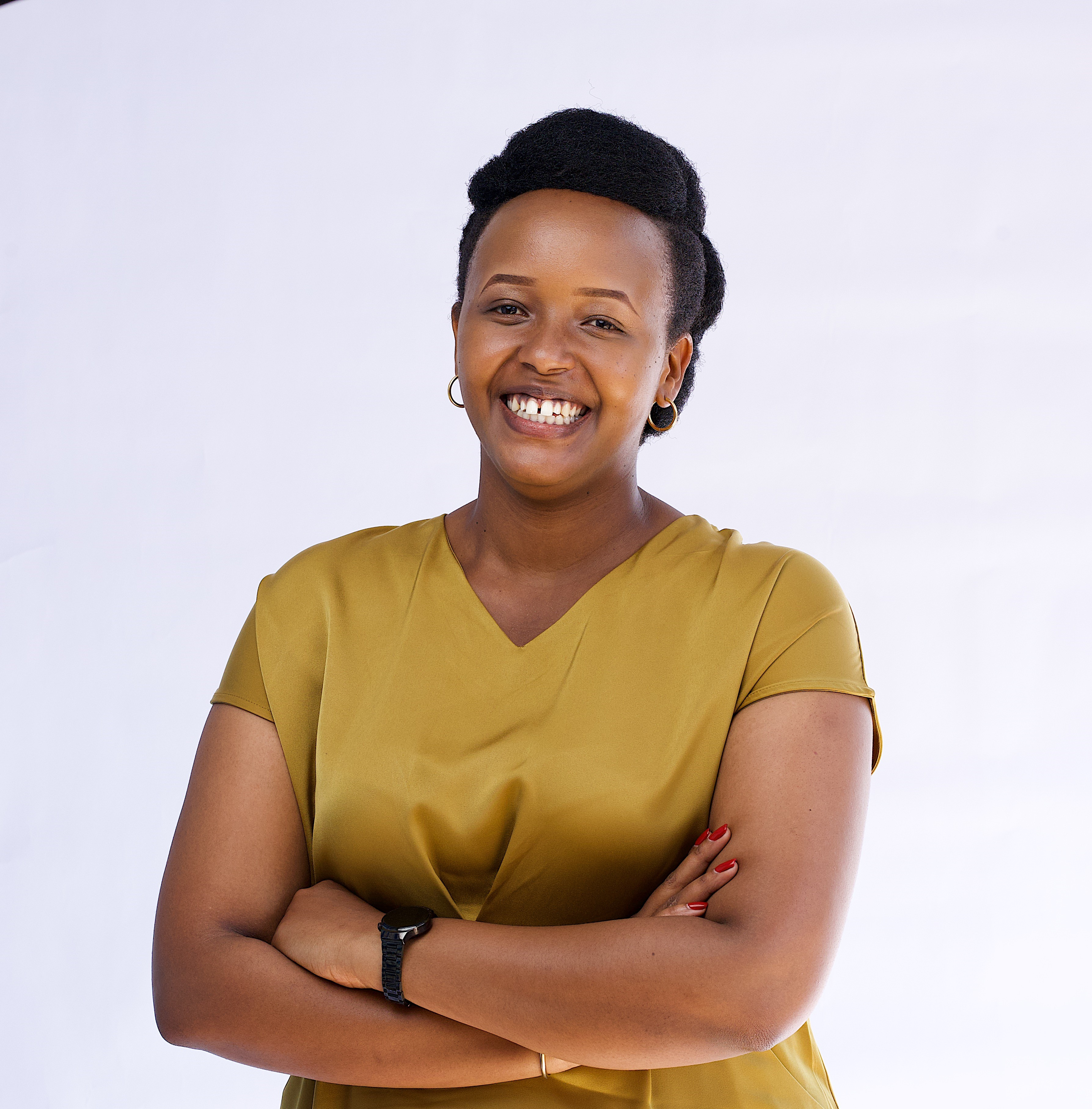
- Born: 1996 (age 29–30); Rwanda
- Citizenship: Rwandan
- Education: Southern New Hampshire University (BA) 2018
- Occupations: entrepreneur; activist
- Known for: Environmental activism
- Notable work: Iriba Water Group
- Title: Rwandan Enterpriser
- Awards: Queen's Young Leader Award (2017); Mandela Washington Fellow; Cartier Women Initiative Award
- Website: iribawatergroup.com

Yvette Ishimwe (born 1996) is a Rwandan entrepreneur, environmental activist and founder of Iriba Water Group. She is known for transforming Rwanda's water scarcity into business opportunities, benefiting low-income communities.

== Life and career ==
=== Educational background ===
Yvette was born in Kigali, Rwanda. Her interest in water solutions began at a young age, when her parents moved from Kigali to a rural village in Kayonza, in Rwanda's Eastern Province. Yvette pursued higher education at Southern New Hampshire University, where she earned a bachelor's degree in Business Management. In 2016, she graduated from the Entrepreneurial Action-Learning Program certified by Regent University (USA).

=== Career ===
Yvette served as the 2nd Vice President of the Chamber of Young Entrepreneurs within the Private Sector Federation of Rwanda for two years and she currently leads Iriba Water Group as its CEO.

Iriba Water Group

Founded in 2017, Iriba Water Group is a social enterprise committed to providing safe drinking water to under-served rural and urban communities in Rwanda. With Yvette as its Chief Executive Officer, the company operates through a network of water kiosks and water filtration systems, including water ATMs. As of 2023, Iriba’s 74 Tap & Drink systems is said to have brought safe, affordable drinking water to more than 300,000 people in Rwanda and the Democratic Republic of the Congo. The company has also created 68 jobs and prevents the emission of 62 metric tons of CO_{2} each month.

== Awards and recognition ==
- In 2017, she received the Queen’s Young Leader Award from Queen Elizabeth II at Buckingham Palace.
- YALI Mandela Washington Fellow–2019.
- Top 10 African Business Hero –2021.
- African Youth Adaptation Solutions Challenge Winner–2022.
- Forbes Africa's 30 Under 30– 2023.
- Bayer Foundation Women Empowerment Award Winner–2023.
- Cartier Women Initiative Award Winner–2023.
