= Alex Mativo =

Kenyan entrepreneur and fashion designer (born 1994)

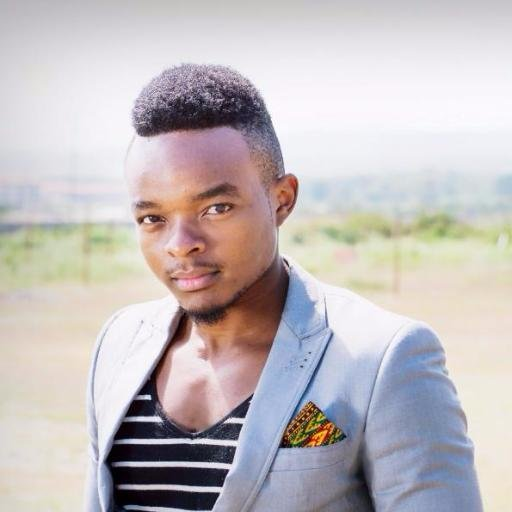
- Alex in 2015
- Born: 21 April 1994 (age 32); Nairobi, Kenya,
- Education: African Leadership University
- Occupations: Founder and CEO at E-LAB, Nanasi, and Duck
- Years active: 2014 - present

Alex Mativo (born 21 April 1994) is a Kenyan entrepreneur, innovator, and fashion designer, recognized for his contributions to technology, sustainability, and business in Africa. He is the co-founder of Duck, an AI and data analytics company that provides real-time retail insights to consumer brands, and E-LAB, a company aimed at eradicating electronic waste in Africa by transforming it into products for the fashion and interior design industry. He is also the recipient of the Queen's Young Leaders Award. and Forbes 30 Under 30 list in 2024 for his impact in technology and innovation.

He previously founded, Nanasi, a Point of sale for quick serive restaurants

== Early life ==
Alex Mativo was born in Nairobi, Kenya grew up in Athi-river. He attended Lenana school in Nairobi.

== Career ==
In 2013 Mativo founded E-LAB, to help solve the problem of electronic waste in his community.

In the same year his company E-LAB participated in the Startup open competition was listed among the global entrepreneurship week top 50 most innovative companies in the world by the Global Entrepreneurship week and the Kauffman foundation

He is also the Founder and CEO of the retail company Nanasi.

== Enterprise and entrepreneurship ==
Mativo has spoken to audiences across Africa to share his business start-up story. Notable public speaking appearances include a TEDx talk on why we should embrace design thinking at the African Leadership University in May 2016 alongside the President of the Republic of Mauritius Ameenah Gurib-Fakim, and at the 2024 Misk global forum in Riyadh

He was also an attendee of the 2015 "one young world summit" in Bangkok, Thailand where he represented his country Kenya.

Mativo has developed several high impact projects through E-LAB which have resulted in the eradication of 3000 tons electronic waste Across Africa.

His work has been featured on international media houses notably CNN, Al Jazeera, eNCA Africa and the BBC.

== Awards ==
- Forbes 30 under 30 2024
- 2015 DXD (disruption by design) upcoming disruptor of the year by Up Magazine
- GEW 50 2013 by Global entrepreneurship week
- Queen's Young Leaders Award 2016
- Global Student Entrepreneurship Award 2017
