= Zaiba Tahyya =

Bangladeshi women's rights activist

- Organization: Female Empowerment Movement
- Awards: Queen's Young Leader Award

Zaiba Tahyya is a Bangladeshi women's rights advocate. She established Female Empowerment Movement (FEM) to combat violence against women and promote gender equality. The organization led various programs such as teaching women self-defense in order to diminish rape cases in impoverished areas where cases are high.

== Life ==
Tahyya was born in Bangladesh. She spent her elementary years in Canada and moved back to Bangladesh where she finished middle school and high school. She obtained her degree in criminology from the UK.

Tahyya spent her summer internship at Bangladesh Legal Aid and Services Trust (BLAST). As a research intern, she was involved in a study concerning the verification of rape cases via two-finger test. Her exposure to cases of violence against women, such as the numerous incidents of unreported sexual abuse, triggered a desire in her to address the issue.

Tahyya worked as a research associate at Police Staff College, specializing in violence against women.

== Female Empowerment Movement ==
FEM was established in 2016 to empower women in Bangladesh through various projects. The organizations aims to increase women's mobility and decrease their vulnerability.

While doing her thesis, Tahyya did a literature review on Why Men Rape. She learned that one of the reasons why men rape is to exercise power — as reiterated by Darwin's theory of evolutionary mechanism and survival to the fittest — since women were perceived as the weaker sex. Hence, Tahyya aimed to empower women rather than just prevent assault. FEM's first program, Project Attorokkha, trained women with disadvantaged backgrounds self-defense. While initially there were difficulties in convincing parents to get girls on board, considering that gender notions were challenged, the initiative ended up becoming successful. Tahyya concentrated on slum areas because women are more prone to experience sexual violence there.

Project Attorokkha provides Krav Maga and military training. FEM partnered with VO2 Urban Fitness, a martial arts school and physical fitness center for the project.

Tahyya also conducted an anti-harassment campaign by putting up paintings on buses to raise awareness on the issue.

FEM has educated girls about computer literacy and cybersecurity via Cyber Attorokkha. The program has helped women who are victims of sextortion.

FEM has provided English lessons, cycling and vocational training to women. Tahyya is planning to expand the organization outside Bangladesh.
