= Brad Olsen =

New Zealand economist

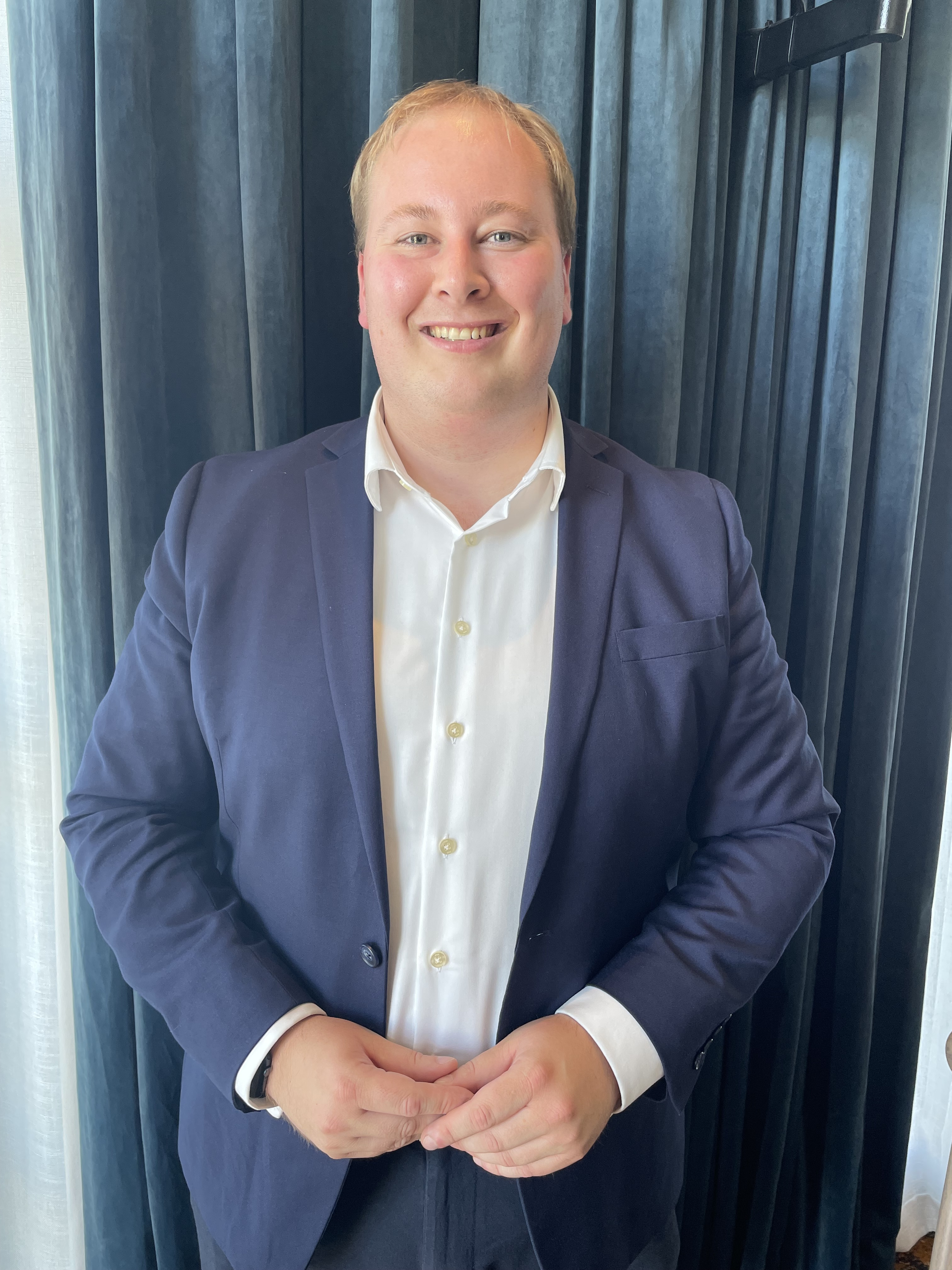
- Born: January 1997 (age 29); Whangārei, New Zealand
- Known for: A New Zealand economics commentator and CEO of Infometrics
- Website: https://www.infometrics.co.nz/team/brad-olsen

Brad Olsen (born January 1997) is a New Zealand economics commentator and CEO of Infometrics, an economic consultancy in Wellington. The New Zealand Herald described him as a "household name" after the COVID-19 pandemic.

== Early life ==
Olsen was born in Whangārei. As a child he would watch the evening news and write notes into a notepad about trends in the stock market. Olsen attended St Francis Xavier School, where he was a volunteer librarian, road patroller, and bell ringer. He also attended Whangārei Boys' High School. His mother said that Olsen did not go through a "rebellious teenager phase". In primary school he competed with a group in an international problem-solving competition in the United States; his team won. He was also an inaugural member of the Whangarei District Council Youth Advisory Group and helped set up a free health clinic for 12- to 18-year-olds. Aged 16 he flew to Fiji as a UNICEF Youth Ambassador to attend a bullying forum. When he was 17 he received a Leadership Award in the Youth Week Awards in Parliament. The next year he made a submission to Parliament on behalf of the National Youth Advisory Group, which advises the Minister for Youth. The submission was about why or why not young people were voting during the 2014 election. The same year he travelled to Malta to participate in 33Sixty, a four-day summit with 100 other young leaders from Commonwealth countries. He was there to help "solve profiteering from the refugee crisis".

== Career ==
After he left high school, Olsen received an internship after a scholarship at Infometrics, a Wellington economic consultancy company which he became CEO of in 2022. He studied a double degree in economics and politics at Victoria University while working part-time. After graduating, he received the title "senior economist". When he was 22, a year after graduating, he was used as an expert economics commentator by journalists. He received the Queen's Young Leader Award in Buckingham Palace in 2016, and Young Wellingtonian of the year in 2020.

During their tour of New Zealand in 2021 he met Prince Harry and Meghan Markle. He is a regular speaker on Breakfast and Newstalk ZB. As of 2020, Olsen is a member of Asia New Zealand Foundation's Leadership Network, Wellington Council's District Alcohol Licensing Committee, NZQA's External Advisory Group, the Citizens Health Council of the Capital and Coast DHB, and the Wellington Youth Council. In 2019, he was appointed a Justice of the peace (JP), becoming the youngest JP in New Zealand at that time.
