= Kontihene =

Ghanaian hiplife artist

Emmanuel Nana Appiah Boateng known by his stage name Kontihene is a Ghanaian hiplife musician. 'Aketesea' from his debut album Nyankonton won the Song of the Year Award during the 2003 edition of the Vodafone Ghana Music Awards making him the first new artist at the time to have received this award.

== Early life ==
Kontihene was born in the 1980s. He grew up in the city of Kumasi in the Ashanti Region of Ghana. He had his basic education at the Martyrs of Uganda School and went on to Opoku Ware Secondary School. He learnt to play both the piano and the saxophone. He was raised as a Pentecostal, and mentored by local musician named Tommy Weireeda. Eventually, Kontihene and his family relocated to the US, where he continued to pursue his musical career.

== Awards ==
=== Vodafone Ghana Music Awards ===
Year	Nominee / work	Award	Result
2003	Aketesea	Song of the Year	Won
2003	Himself	New Artist of the Year	Won
