= Erna Takazawa =

Optometrist

Erna Fumi Rebecca Fotuofaamanuiaga Takazawa
- Born: 21 December 1988 (age 37); Japan
- Occupation: optometrist
- Years active: 2012–present
- Known for: Samoa's first qualified optometrist

Fuiavailili Erna Takazawa (born 1988) is the first fully qualified optometrist of Samoa. In 2014, she was awarded as one of the inaugural recipients the Queen's Young Leader Award.

== Biography ==
Erna Fumi Rebecca Fotuofaamanuiaga Takazawa was born in Japan and raised in Samoa. She became interested in optometry after her younger sister was diagnosed with myopia, and gained a scholarship to study at the University of Auckland. She graduated with First Class Honors with degree in optometry in 2011 and was licensed in 2012. She is the first fully qualified optometrist on the island and began working immediately at the newly established Samoa Vision Centre.

Takazawa also works in conjunction with the National Health Service and SENESE, a support program for special needs children. Her work has led to free eye care services for children and the elderly and a reduction in cost of eyewear for adults. In 2013, she screened over 200 athletes with the Special Olympics. She also teaches basic eye-care to medical professioanls in Fiji and around the Pacific.

From 2016 to 2019 she served on Samoa's Allied Health Council.

== Honours and awards ==
She has been granted the matai title of "Fuiavailili" by her village.

In 2014, Takazawa's work was recognized when she was awarded the Queen's Young Leader Award. The annual award is given to selected citizens throughout the Commonwealth who work to better lives in their communities.

In 2017 she was named the University of Auckland 2017 Young Alumna of the Year for her work improving eye-care in Samoa and the Pacific.
