= SustyVibes =

Sustainability organization based in Lagos, Nigeria

SustyVibes is a nonprofit organization consisting of youth groups that are focused on environmental and climate action. The goal of the organization is to make sustainability relatable, actionable, and cool in Africa. With the support of volunteers, it carries out campaigns and projects in Nigeria and Ghana.

Campaigns and projects performed by SustyVibes are centered on global and regional issues such as climate change, climate and mental health, plastic pollution, eco-feminism, youth development, and sustainability popular culture. SustyVibes (abbreviation for Sustainability Vibes) operates out of Lagos, Nigeria.

SustyVibes which was founded by Jennifer Uchendu has over 700 members and volunteers (referred to as 'SustyVibers').

SustyVibes has been involved in tree planting, community clean-ups, and educational workshops on renewable energy and sustainable living. SustyVibes conducts research and advocacy work to raise awareness about environmental issues in Nigeria and suggests solutions for addressing them. The organization has partnered with other NGOs and government agencies on various initiatives. In 2022, Uchendu was named one of the 'Top 20 Young Women in Sustainable Development' by Young Women in Sustainable Development.
