= Kellyn George =

Dominica researcher

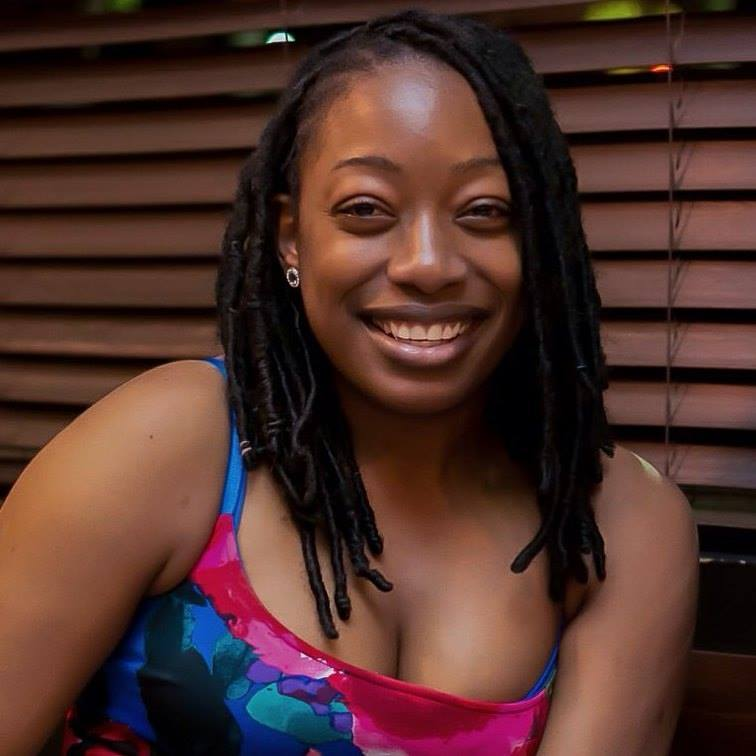
- Occupation: Researcher
- Years active: 2013–present
- Known for: Establishing Sickle Cell Cares Foundation

Kellyn George is from Dominica and in 2013 created a support foundation to help people with sickle cell anemia in her homeland. In 2015, she was awarded Queen's Young Leader Award for her activism in changing the lives of people in her community.

== Biography ==
Kellyn George is a Dominican from the village of Mahaut. In 2006 she earned a double associate degree from Dominica State College in chemistry and biology and went on to study at Midwestern State University in Wichita Falls, Texas, from 2006 to 2008. From 2008 to 2010, George studied biology at Barry University and in 2011 her research team was the first-place winner of the Biology S.T.E.M. (Science, Technology, Engineering, and Math) Award at the 3rd Annual S.T.E.M. Research Symposium, for their work on the "effect of embryonic ethanol exposure on zebrafish cranial motor neuron development".

Completing her studies, George returned to Dominica where she worked with the Commonwealth of Dominica on their Organisation of Eastern Caribbean States (OECS) Electronic Government for Regional Integration Project (E-GRIP) in 2012. At the end of 2013, George took a research officer's position at the Livestock Development Unit of the Ministry of Agriculture.

In January 2013, George founded an NGO called the Sickle Cell Cares Foundation to provide information and education about sickle cell disease in Dominica. George, who serves as director of the organization, recognized the need for additional support because she has had the disease all her life and statistics show that 35% of the citizens of the island have the disease.

In January 2015, George was named as one of the winners of the inaugural Queen's Young Leaders Award for 2014 for her work in improving the lives of her fellow citizens. The awards were bestowed in June 2015.
