= Virginia Khunguni =

Women's rights activist

- Born: North Carolina, USA
- Citizenship: Malawian
- Education: Mahatma Gandhi University
- Occupation: Women's Right Activist
- Organization: Girls Arise for Change
- Awards: Queen's Young Leader Award
- Honours: Mandela Washington Fellowship

Virginia Khunguni is a women's rights activist from Malawi. She is the founder and director of Girls Arise for Change, an organization that aims to empower women in order to foster social and cultural change. The organization led initiatives in combatting child labor, child marriage and sexual exploitation. Khunguni is a recipient of Queen's Young Leader Award for her work in Africa.

Khunguni graduated with a degree in Mass Communication major in journalism from Mahatma Gandhi University.

== Personal life ==
Khunguni was born in North Carolina, USA. She is the youngest between two male siblings. A few years later, they moved to Blantyre, Malawi. Khunguni was orphaned and lived under her grandparents.

Growing up, Khunguni aspired to be a music producer, she dreamt to be the first female music producer in Malawi. Khunguni frequently went to studios to study music production and sound engineering. A producer raped her, and her grandparents reacted by threatening to throw her out, if she got involved in more incidents of sexual assault. Her grandmother also warned her to leave the music industry as it is known to be a male dominated sector. Due to the stigma associated with rape victims, Khunguni remained silent, she quitted music and decided to study Journalism.

As a journalist, Khunguni encountered many silent victims of sexual abuse, she decided to establish radio program "Girls Arise" to address the issue. The program featured victims of gender-based violence, experts in the human rights and medical field were invited to impart their advice. Community members were also called in to discuss efforts in addressing the issue and diminish the stigma associated with it.

The radio program received enormous response from the community, there were even reports from female community leaders. Khunguni decided that the radio program was not enough to end the rampant gender-based violence. In 2013, Khunguni founded Girls Arise for Change. It aims to challenge notions and end cultural practices that are against the improvement of women's status in Malawi. The organization aims to promote the rights of young women to health and education. Khunguni contacted community leaders from different districts and established a structure of community support to expand the initiative.

Girls Arise for Change has rescued and provided support to girls that escaped early marriage and those that were forced to child labor, even prostitution. The organization also provides rape victims medical and psychological assistance. Khunguni cooperated with health organizations to establish mobile clinics in remote areas so as to educate the youth and provide reproductive health services.

Khunguni knew that poverty is a top contributor to early marriage and child labor, she knew many cannot afford higher education and are forced to accept such circumstances. Therefore, Girls Arise for Change provides girls vocational training. The organization partnered with people in Nigeria, America and Kenya to ensure that the products they create will be sold and they will be able to sustain themselves. They have trained girls in renewable energy, culinary arts, videography and fashion design; Girls Arise for Change has helped more than 3,500 young women.
