= Ghita Mezzour =

Moroccan politician

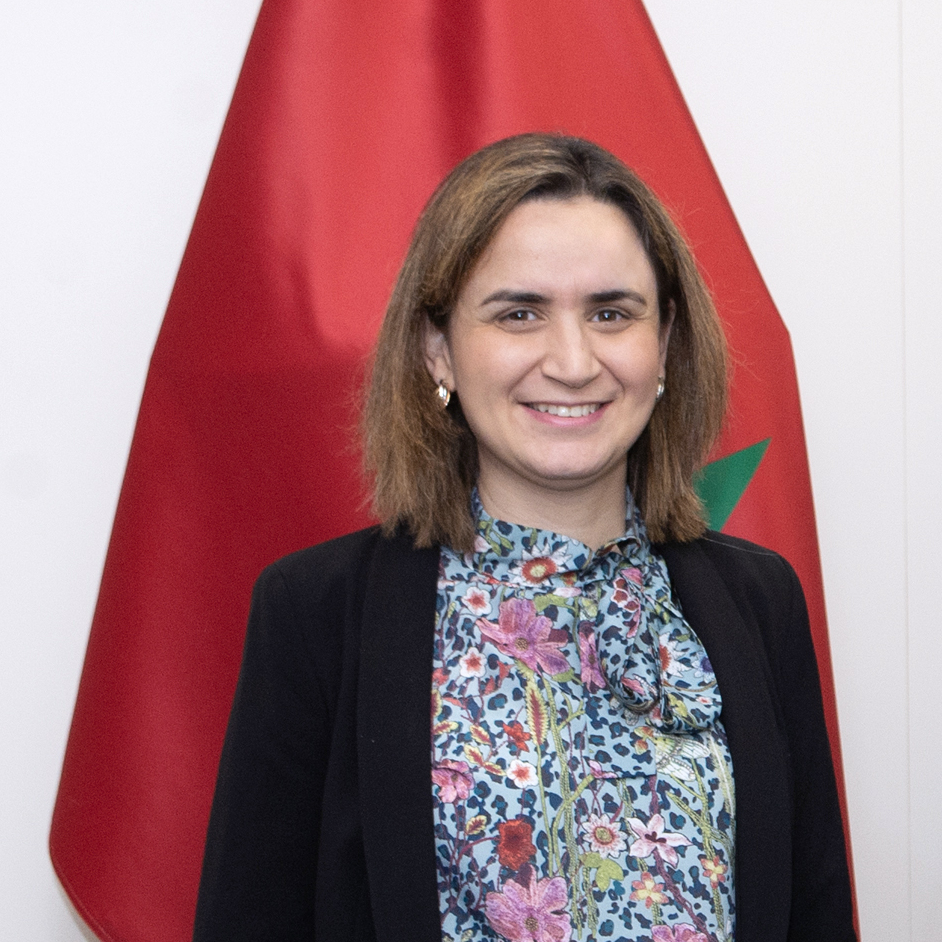
- in 2022

Minister Delegate to the Head of Government in charge of Digital Transition and Administration Reform
- In office 7 October 2021 – 23 October 2024
- Monarch: Mohammed VI of Morocco
- Prime Minister: Aziz Akhannouch
- Succeeded by: Amal El Fallah Seghrouchni

Personal details
- Education: École Polytechnique Fédérale de Lausanne (M.Sc.); Carnegie Mellon University (PhD)

Ghita Mezzour was the Moroccan Minister Delegate to the Head of Government in charge of the Digital Transition and Administration Reform from October 2021 to October 2024 as part of the cabinet led by Aziz Akhannouch.

== Education ==
Mezzour obtained her master's degree from the École Polytechnique Fédérale de Lausanne in Switzerland and her doctorate from Carnegie Mellon University in Pittsburgh.

== Career ==
She is an expert in Artificial intelligence and previously taught at the International University of Rabat. She was appointed as a minister by Mohammed VI of Morocco in 2021. Mezzour's appointment was intended to drive Morocco's strategy for digitising public institutions and increasing women's participation in high-level policy-making.
