= Alexia Hilbertidou =

New Zealand social entrepreneur

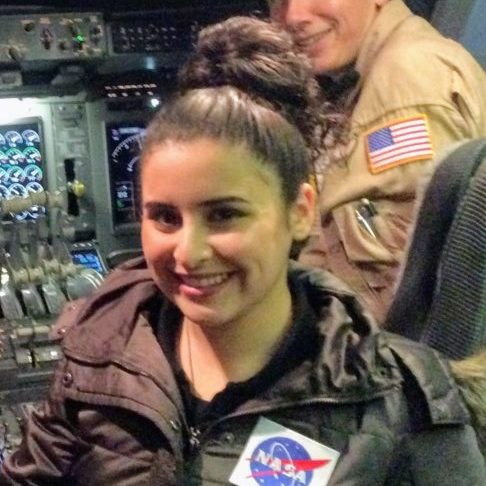
- ilbertidou on SOFIA 's Boeing 747SP in 2017
- Born: Cyprus
- Education: Albany Senior High School, Auckland
- Occupation: Social Entrepreneur
- Known for: GirlBoss New Zealand

Alexia Hilbertidou is a New Zealand social entrepreneur and the founder of GirlBoss New Zealand, a social enterprise focusing on women's empowerment in leadership, entrepreneurship, and STEM (science, technology, engineering and mathematics). By 2024, GirlBoss New Zealand had attracted 17,500 members, with 1 in 5 of all high school-aged young women in New Zealand.

== Early life and education ==
Hilbertidou was born in Cyprus and moved to New Zealand. She is of Greek and Samoan descent.

Hilbertidou was raised in Kelston, West Auckland. She was educated at Albany Senior High School, Auckland.

== Career ==
In 2015, Hilbertidou founded GirlBoss New Zealand as a way to encourage teenage girls to participate more fully in leadership, entrepreneurship, science, technology, engineering, and maths. The organisation's programmes are offered free of charge. As of 2024, GirlBoss New Zealand has attracted 17,500 members, with 1 in 5 of all high school-aged young women in New Zealand/Aotearoa.

In July 2017, Hilbertidou was invited by NASA to board the Stratospheric Observatory for Infrared Astronomy's Boeing 747SP Shuttle Carrier Aircraft (SCA) during an overnight exploratory mission.

Hilbertidou is also a member of the Super Diverse Women Network led by New Zealand lawyer Mai Chen. In 2019, Hilbertidou was appointed to the board of Simplicity, a philanthropic investment fund. In 2022, Hilbertidou was appointed a Gender Equality Ambassador at Expo 2020 Dubai.

== Awards ==
- 2016 Young Leader Award, New Zealand Women of Influence Awards.
- 2017 New Zealand’s first Eisenhower Youth Fellow.
- 2018 Queen's Young Leader Award for her work founding GirlBoss New Zealand.
- 2020 Finalist - World Young Entrepreneur of the Year, One Young World.
- 2021 Forbes' 30 under 30 Asia list.
- 2022 Pacific Young Entrepreneur of the Year, Pacific Business Trust.
- 2024 The Diana Award.
- 2025 Finalist - Young New Zealander of the Year Award.
- AIMES Bellingham Wallace Emergent Talent Award.
