= Shadrack Frimpong =

Ghanaian entrepreneur and global health leader

- Education: University of Cambridge; University of Pennsylvania; Yale School of Public Health
- Occupation: Entrepreneur

Shadrack Osei Frimpong (born 1993 or 1994) is a Ghanaian entrepreneur and global health leader. He is the founder of Cocoa360, a nonprofit organisation in rural Ghana where villagers work on communal cocoa farms in exchange for free tuition at an all-girls school and subsidized healthcare. Frimpong has won several awards, including the Queen's Young Leader Award and the Muhammad Ali Humanitarian Award. He received an Honorary Doctorate from Royal Holloway, University of London.

== Early life and education ==
Frimpong was born in 1993 or 1994 in Tarkwa Breman, Ghana. His parents farmed and sold charcoal, and he grew up in a household without running water or electricity. At age nine, he experienced a serious infection of his legs that nearly resulted in their amputation. His parents had to use their farm as collateral for a loan so that he could receive treatment at a hospital five hours away. He recalled hoping and praying during his illness that he would not lose his legs, saying, "If I can keep these legs, then I will use them and work to help other people." After recovering from his illness, he became passionate about his education, taking his studies much more seriously.

For high school, he attended the Opoku Ware School in Kumasi, Ghana, funded in part by a scholarship from the Ghana Cocoa Board. In 2015, he graduated from the University of Pennsylvania with a degree in biology. He was the first person from his village to attend college in the U.S. In 2018, he returned to University of Pennsylvania for a master's degree in non-profit leadership. He also holds an Advanced MPH, Global Health from the Yale School of Public Health's Advanced Professional Program and has pursued a Ph.D. in Public Health and Primary Care from the University of Cambridge as a Gates-Cambridge scholar. He is also pursuing a Doctor of Medicine Degree (M.D) at the Yale School of Medicine.

== Career and Research ==
Frimpong used the prize money from Amy Gutmann's President's Engagement Prize to found the nonprofit Cocoa360, where proceeds from a community-run cocoa farm are used to provide free education to 300 students at the organization's Tarkwa Breman Girls School (as of 2023), and to subsidize healthcare at its medical clinic to over 17000 patients. The first school to open under the program did so in 2017, and served approximately 150 students as of 2019. As of 2019, Cocoa360 had 60 acres (0.24 km^{2}) of communal land, which consists of the school campus, 10 acres of cocoa farms, and land that is uncultivated. Villagers volunteer labour on the cocoa farm in exchange for tuition-free education at the school and subsidized healthcare. In 2019, Frimpong was appointed as an editor of the Yale Journal of Health Policy, Law, and Ethics. He co-founded the African Research Academies for Women, Inc. He also founded the organization, Students for A Healthy Africa, which provides health insurance to AIDS orphans in Ghana. Frimpong's most recent work includes exploring the role of Agriculture in achieving Universal Health Coverage in Africa, a paper written with Sten H Vermund, Dean of the Yale School of Public Health. He is a member of the Royal Society of Medicine, the UK Faculty of Public Health and the American Economic Association.

== Awards and honours ==
Frimpong was a recipient of the Amy Gutmann's President's Engagement Prize in 2015, where he received $150,000. In the same year, he also received the Samuel Huntington Public Service Award, which has had past recipients such as U.S. Surgeon General Vivek Murthy and MacArthur "Genius" Fellow Angela Duckworth. In 2018, he received the Queen's Young Leader Award. Also in 2018, he received the Boyer Scholarship, becoming the second African recipient and first ever from West Africa. The Boyer Scholarship resulted in him becoming a member of the First Troop Philadelphia City Cavalry. In 2018, he was named as one of Forbes's "30 under 30" social entrepreneurs for 2019. Frimpong also graduated from the University of Pennsylvania Nonprofit Leadership Program with the Richard J. Estes Global Citizenship Award, which is awarded to a graduate of the Nonprofit Leadership Program who exhibits academic excellence, a commitment to improving the world, and dedication to social impact. Upon enrolling in Yale University School of Public Health, Frimpong received the Horstmann Scholarship to fund his Master's in Public Health degree. In 2019, Frimpong was also one of six recipients of the Muhammad Ali Humanitarian Award, which recognizes activists who work towards social change under age thirty. He was awarded a Gates Cambridge Scholarship in 2020 to pursue a Ph.D. in public health and primary care at the University of Cambridge in England. He holds an Honorary Doctorate from Royal Holloway, University of London in recognition of his contribution to global health and community engagement in Africa.
