= Angelique Pouponneau =

Seychellois environmentalist

- Born: Bel Ombre
- Education: University of London
- Occupation: Lawyer
- Awards: Queen's Young Leader Award

Angelique Pouponneau is a Seychellois lawyer and environmentalist.

Pouponneau was born and raised in a fishing region in Bel Ombre.

== Education ==
Pouponneau earned a bachelor's degree in law from the University of London. She undertook the bar professional training course from the University of West England. Pouponneau earned her LLM in environmental law from Queen Mary University of London.

== Environmentalism ==
Prior to obtaining an LLM in Environmental Law, Pouponneau has always been an environmental advocate. She co-founded SIDS Youth Aims Hub (SYAH), a youth-led NGO that aims to reverse the effects of climate change and promote sustainable development in Seychelles. Its campaign entitled ”Seychelles Free From Plastic Bags” led to the ban of plastic bags in the country.

Pouponneau received a climate change negotiator training from the AOSIS Climate Change Fellowship Programme at the United Nations.

Pouponneau became the CEO of Seychelles' Conservation and Climate Adaptation Trust (SeyCCaT) in 2018. It was established to manage the funds gained when the Seychelles government signed a marine rehabilitation deal in exchange for payment of its national debt. SeyCCat is dedicated in ensuring the country's blue economy. Under Pouponneau's leadership, livelihood initiatives were conducted; for instance, when underprivileged women were invited to rid beaches of seaweed which was then turned to compost for gardening.

Pouponneau has worked for environmental causes in the Caribbean, Pacific and the Indian Ocean. She has been a board member of several environmental NGOs in Seychelles and around the world.
