= Kennedy Ekezie =

Nigerian entrepreneur and philosopher

Kennedy Ekezie-Joseph
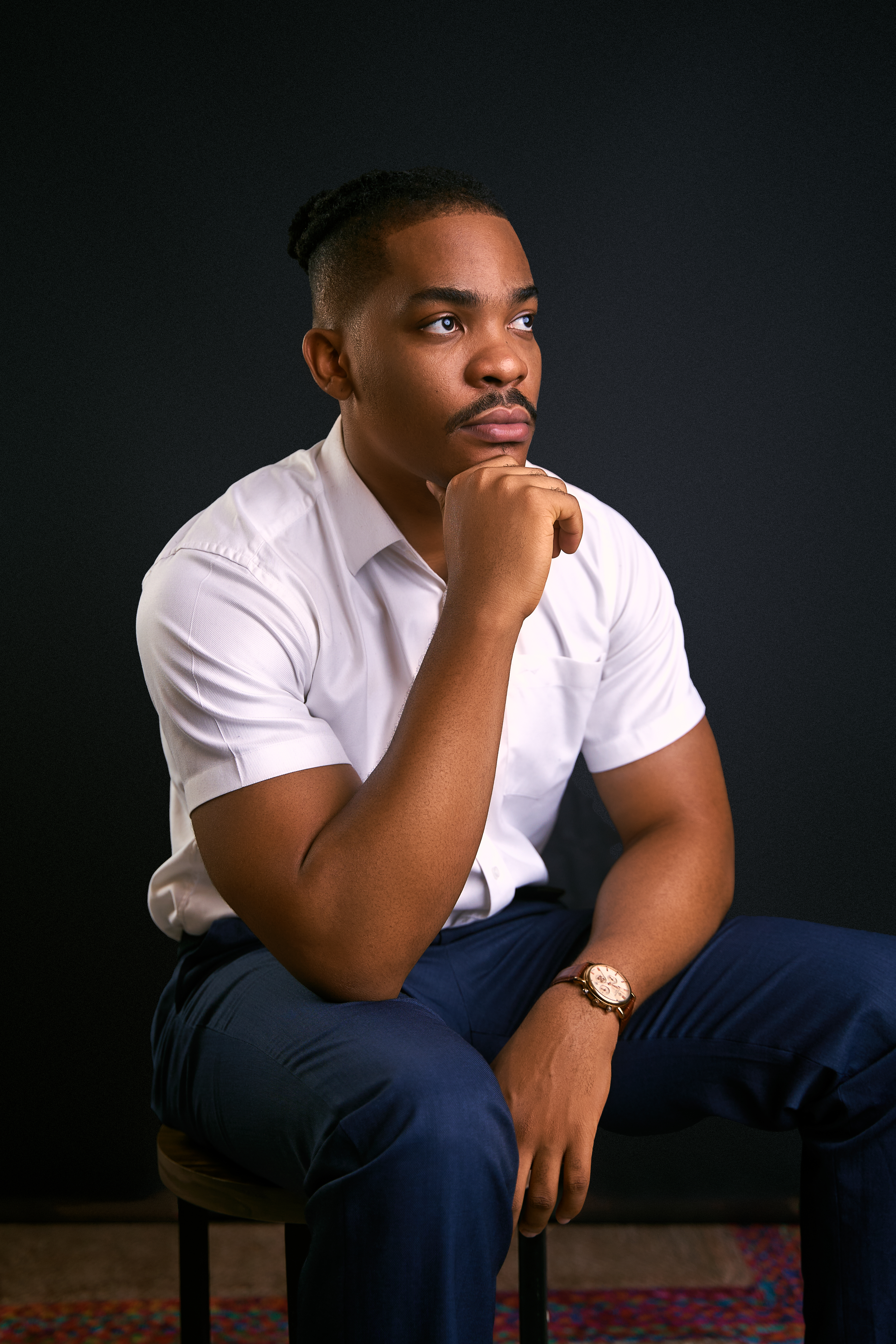
- Born: 11 June 1998 (age 28); Lagos, Nigeria
- Education: University of Cambridge (Dip); University of Calabar (BA); Peking University (MA)
- Occupation: Entrepreneur
- Years active: 2014-present
- Known for: founding Kippa
- Awards: Queen's Young Leader Award (2018); The Future Awards Africa Prize for Technology (2022)

Kennedy Ekezie-Joseph (born 11 June 1998) is a Nigerian-born entrepreneur. He is the co-founder and current chief executive officer of Kippa.

In November 2023, Ekezie was listed on the 2024 Forbes 30 under 30 list (North America) in the Finance category.

== Early life and education ==
Ekezie, originally from Ehime Mbano in Imo State, was born in Lagos where he lived for 8 years with his family before his parents relocated to Calabar after they secured jobs there. In 2017, Ekezie graduated with a Bachelor of Arts with honours in philosophy from the University of Calabar and subsequently won a Yenching Scholarship in 2018 to study for a master's degree in Economics and Management at Peking University. He also holds a diploma in Leading Change from the University of Cambridge.

== Career ==
In 2014, at age 16 while studying, Ekezie founded Calabar Youths Council For Women's Rights; an organization he founded to promote women's rights after he discovered that more than 8,000 women are victims of female genital mutilation in Nigeria.

In 2021, he co-founded Kippa. Prior to that, he also worked at ByteDance while on a Yenching Scholarship at Peking University in China. Ekezie has been credited as part of the team that led TikTok into Africa.

== Recognitions and awards ==
In 2017, Ekezie was selected as one of the 30 Global Teen Leaders by the We Are Family Foundation and received President Obama’s Young African Leaders Fellowship. In 2018, Ekezie was awarded the Queen's Young Leader Award by Her Majesty Queen Elizabeth II at Buckingham Palace. He also won the Yenching Scholarship in the same year. For his work as a technology entrepreneur, he was awarded The Future Award Prize for Technology in 2022, and was named to the Forbes 30 under 30 list (North America) in 2023.

== See also ==
- Abisiga Mojeed Damilola
