= Efua Asibon =

Ghanaian activist

- Citizenship: Ghanaian
- Education: University of Cambridge's Institute of Continuing Education, London School of Economics and Political Science

Efua Asibon was one of the three Ghanaians that won the Queen's Young Leader Award in 2017. She is an account manager for Facebook in Ireland the co-founder of Dislabelled, a non profit organisation in Ghana that supports, empowers and educates people with disabilities.

== Education ==
She holds a master's degree in International Development and Humanitarian Emergencies from the London School of Economics and Political Science. Upon receiving the Queen's Young Leader Award, she had the opportunity of being mentored and trained at the University of Cambridge's Institute of Continuing Education in the UK.

== Awards and recognition ==
- In 2017, she won the Queen's Young Leader Award
- She won the Africa Women Innovation and Entrepreneurship Forum (AWIEF) Award in 2019
- She was listed as one of WomanRising's 100 Most Outstanding Women Entrepreneurs in Ghana

== See also ==
- Queen's Young Leader Award
