= Domtila Chesang =

Kenyan women's rights activist

- Organization: I_Rep Foundation
- Known for: Anti-FGM Activism
- Awards: Queen's Young Leader Award

Domtila Chesang is a Kenyan women’s rights activist known for her campaign against female genital mutilation (FGM). She is the founder and director of I_Rep Foundation, which is established to address various forms of violence against girls and women.

Chesang was born and raised in West Pokot County.

== Activism ==
Chesang began campaigning against FGM at 13 years old. She was triggered to do so after witnessing the covert practice being performed on her cousin.

Chesang travels around the region to disseminate her campaign against FGM. She speaks in radio programs to destigmatize the topic. FGM is criminalized in 2011 but it remained prevalent.

Chesang worked with The Guardian’s end FGM media campaign. Chesang also worked as a high school teacher but left shortly to devote her time to her advocacy.

=== I_Rep Foundation ===
I_Rep Foundation, initially called Kepsteno Rotwoo Tipin (Let’s abandon the knife) was founded in 2010. It is established to rescue, support and empower victims of gender based violence, particularly of FGM and forced/early marriage. I-Rep Foundation aims to eradicate FGM in the community. Chesang serves as its director.
