= Opoku Ware School =

All male senior high school in Kumasi, Ashanti Region, Ghana

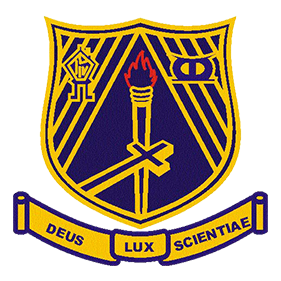

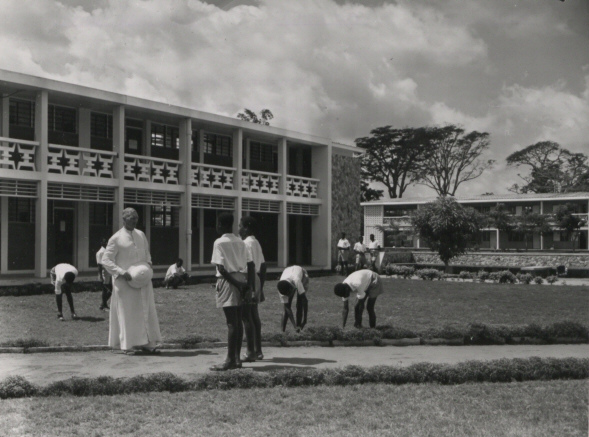

Location
- PO Box 849; Kumasi, Ashanti; Ghana
- 6°39′47″N 1°38′42″W

Information
- Type: Public senior high school
- Motto: Latin: Deus Lux Scientiae
- Religious affiliation: Catholicism
- Established: 1952; 74 years ago
- Oversight: Catholic Church of Ghana
- Grades: Senior High Years 1–3
- Gender: Boys
- Enrollment: 3,000
- Color: Blue
- Mascot: Tortoise
- School anthem: "All Hail Opoku Ware School"
- Website: opokuwareschool.edu.gh

Opoku Ware School, often referred to as OWASS, is a public Catholic senior high school for boys, located in Santasi, a suburb of Kumasi, the capital of the Ashanti region of Ghana. The school code is 0050110. The school's denomination is Catholic. The school is Category A.

== Motto and slogan ==
The school’s motto is the Latin phrase "Deus Lux Scientiae," meaning "God is the Light of Knowledge," while its slogan, "Akatakyie," is an Asante word that means "Conquering Heroes."

== Mission ==
The School is committed to providing high-quality, holistic education that promotes academic excellence and strong moral values for the complete development of its students.

== Vision ==
To strive to be a centre for achieving an integral formation, that has for its objective the total development of the human person.

== Notable alumni ==
- Kenneth Gilbert Adjei, former deputy NDC Minister of State
- Kwamena Ahwoi, former NDC Minister of State
- Owusu Afriyie Akoto, Minister for food and Agriculture
- Stephen Amoah, Member of Parliament for the Nhyiaeso Constituency
- James Kwesi Appiah (O 123) former head coach of the Ghana Black Stars
- George Boakye, former Chief of Air Staff
- Stephen Alan Brobbey, retired jurist; former Chief Justice of the Gambia and justice of the Supreme Court of Ghana
- Shadrack Osei Frimpong, founder of Cocoa360
- George Gyan-Baffour, Minister for Planning and member of parliament (Wenchi)
- Ohene Karikari, former national athlete and Africa's number one sprinter during his time
- Kontihene, hiplife musician
- John Kumah, Deputy Minister of Finance.
- Jacob Kwakye-Maafo, physician, surgeon and CEO of West End Clinic, Kumasi
- Christian Nsiah, Olympic athlete and Business Economics professor at Black Hills State University
- Paul Victor Obeng, mechanical engineer, Politician and former chairman of KNUST council
- Anthony Akoto Osei, former Finance Minister and current MP for Old Tafo
- Ernest Owusu-Poku, former Inspector General of Police, Ghana
- Nana Akuoko Sarpong, traditional ruler of Agogo state, former politician
- Nana Otuo Siriboe II, chairman of the Council of State
- Amadu Sulley, Deputy Electoral Commissioner
- Yaw Tog, musician, rapper
- Jacob Osei Yeboah, politician

== Awards ==
- Took 1st position for the National Science And Maths Quiz 2002

== See also ==
- Navrongo Senior High School
