= Imrana Alhaji Buba =

Nigerian Social Entrepreneur

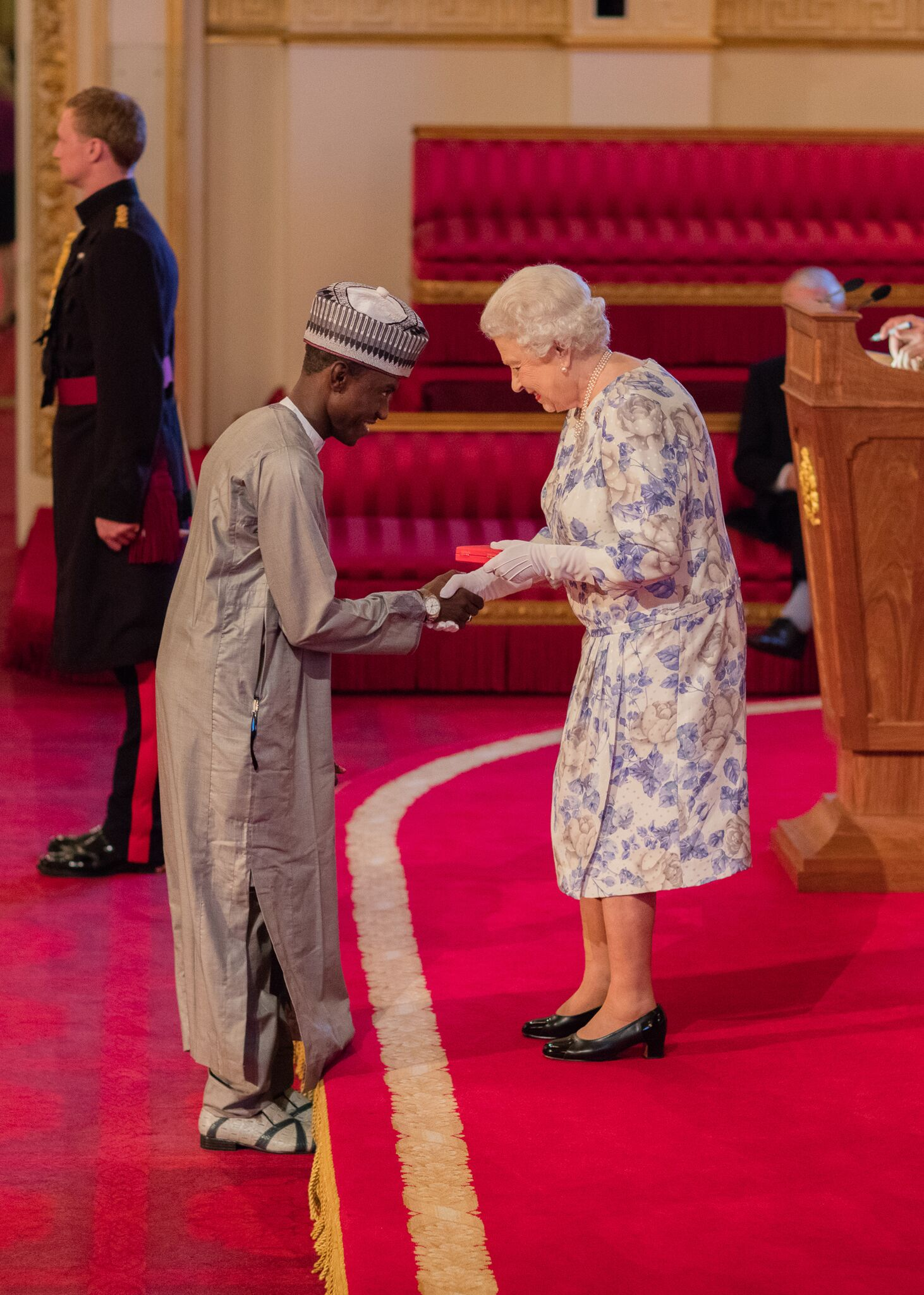
- Imrana Alhaji Buba receiving the 2016 Queen's Young Leaders Award from Her Majesty Queen Elizabeth II
- Born: Imrana Alhaji Buba; 6 August 1992 (age 34); Potiskum, Yobe, Nigeria
- Education: University of Maiduguri; University of Edinburgh, United Kingdom
- Occupation: Social Entrepreneur/Activist
- Organization: Youth Coalition Against Terrorism (YOCAT)
- Known for: Uniting youths against terrorism Northern Nigeria
- Notable work: Youth Coalition Against Terrorism (YOCAT) which is now regarded as Youth Initiative Against Terrorism (YIAT)

Imrana Alhaji Buba (born 6 August 1992) is a Nigerian social entrepreneur and activist who founded Youth Coalition Against Terrorism (YOCAT) which is now regarded as Youth Initiative Against Terrorism (YIAT), a volunteer-based organisation in northern Nigeria working to unite youth against violent extremism through peace education programs in schools and villages.

== Early life and education ==
Buba was born in Potiskum Yobe State on 6 August 1992 and grew up in Potiskum, Yobe state. He is an alumnus of the University of Maiduguri, Borno state where he graduated with a first-class honours degree in Political Science in 2015 and holds a master's degree in Africa and International Development from the University of Edinburgh, United Kingdom in 2018.

== Career and activism ==
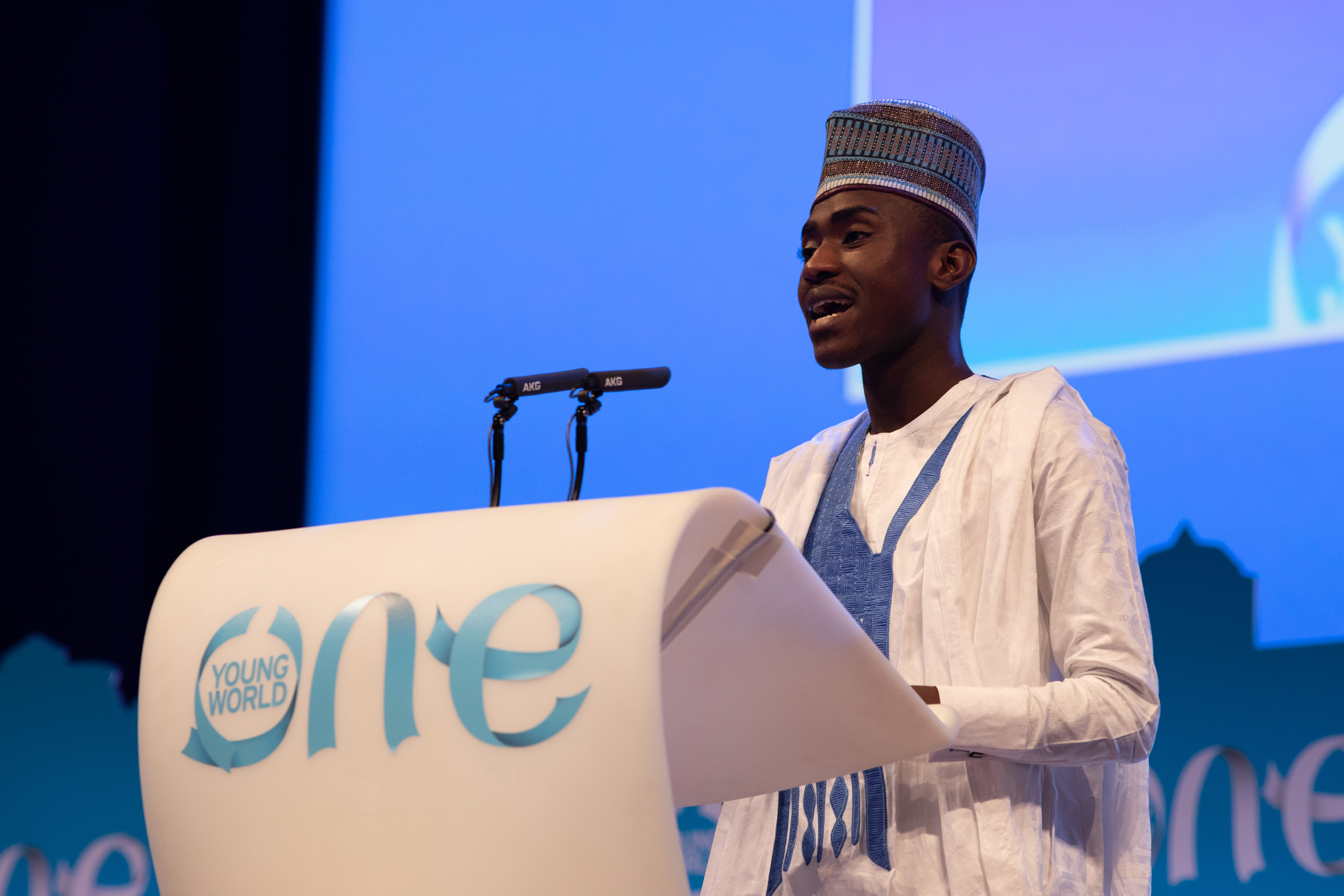
Imrana Alhaji Buba speaking at the 2018 One Young World Summit

Buba had a traumatic experience with Boko haram in June 2010 while he was travelling to the University of Maiduguri as an undergraduate when his bus was stopped by the terrorists and passengers were kidnapped, he survived and also had friends and family who were killed by the Boko haram insurgency. As a result of that he founded the Youth Coalition Against Terrorism (YOCAT) in August 2010 to offer counselling services to victims of terrorism, as well as providing peace education and skills training for unemployed youths.

Buba provided employment opportunities for over 2000 youth in north-eastern Nigeria through partnerships with local government agencies and private organisations and the organisation recruited over 600 volunteers and partnered with many local bodies to organise different beneficial programs for young people in north-eastern Nigeria.

In 2016, he was selected as one of the three Nigerians and twenty-one African change makers in the Commonwealth for the Queen's Young Leaders Award by Her Majesty Queen Elizabeth II of the United Kingdom. His efforts around peace building in northern Nigeria made him a fellow of Generation Change Fellowship of the United States Institute of Peace (USIP).

Buba was selected for the 2017 JCI Ten Outstanding Young Persons of the World, his effort to counter violent extremism and enhance a culture of peace in Nigeria, which led him being part of the 2017 Mandela Washington Fellowship program for Young African leaders in Washington D.C. He is also a fellow of LEAP Africa SIP and YALI West Africa.

His efforts in initiating peaceful youths in Northern-Nigeria made him speaker, particularly regarding to political instability in the country. He was a speaker/panelist at the 2016/2017 International Day of Peace events at the United States Institute of Peace (USIP), speaker at the 2017 Wage Peace event at the American University, speaker/panelist at the 2017 United Nations International Youth Day event, speaker at the 2018 United Nations International Day for the Remembrance of Victims of Terrorism and the 2018 One Young World Summit.

Buba's stated vision is to enhance a culture of peace and tolerance that can break the cycle of conflict, violence, and terrorism that plagues Nigeria.

== Awards and recognitions ==
- 2016, Nominated for Future Award Africa award Prize for Advocacy
- 2016, Generation Change Fellow of the United States Institute of Peace (USIP)
- 2016, Policy Specialist on CVE and DDR with the Global Alliance for Youth Countering Violent Extremism
- 2016, Queen's Young Leaders Award
- 2017 JCI Ten Outstanding Young Persons of the World
- 2017, Mandela Washington Fellow

== See also ==
- List of peace activists
