= Khairunnisa Ash'ari =

Bruneian activist and politician (born 1987)

Khairunnisa Ash'ari PSB PIKB
- خيرالنساء اشءاري
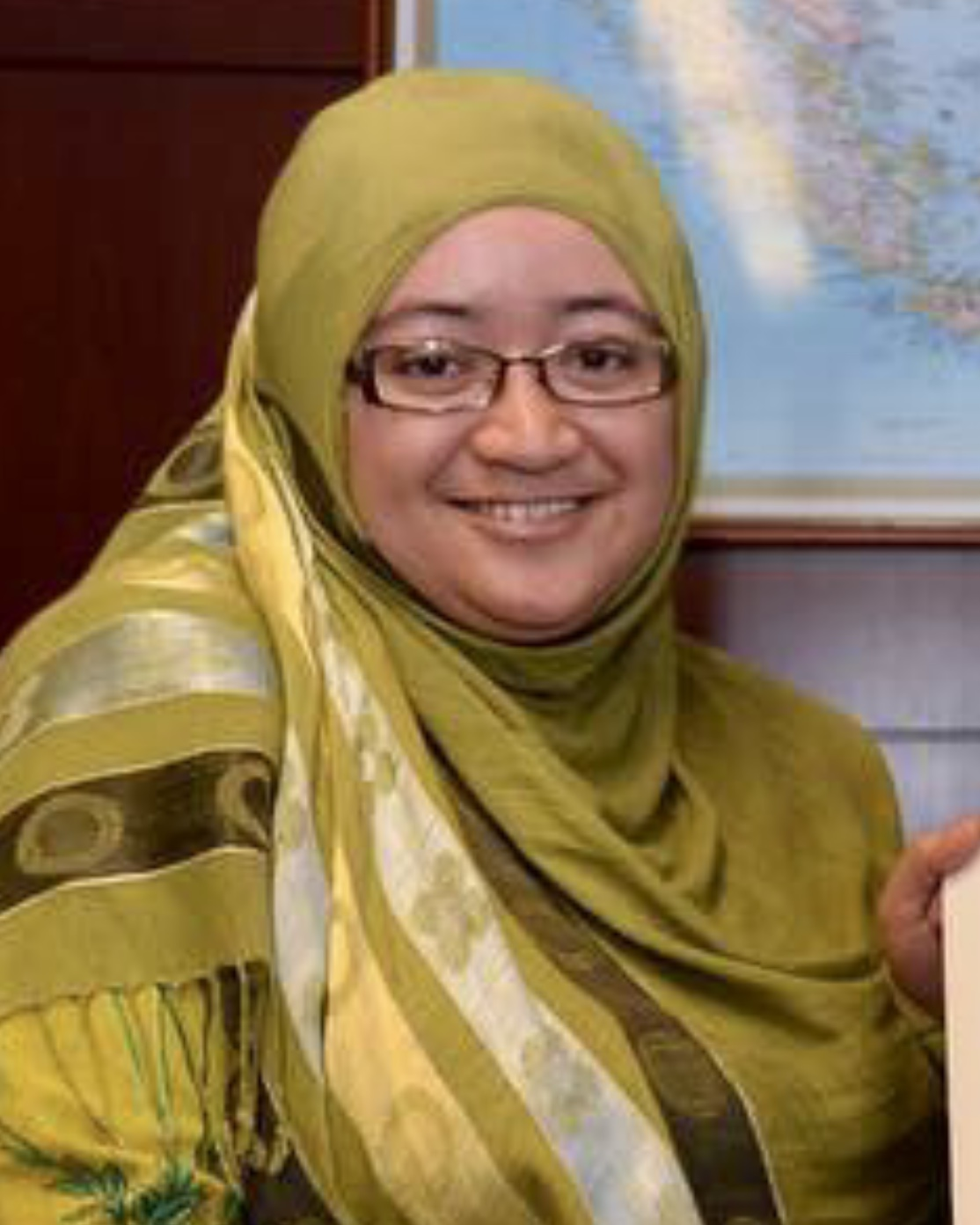
- Khairunnisa in 2019

Member of the Legislative Council
- In office 13 January 2017 – 6 March 2022

Personal details
- Born: 1987 (age 38–39) Brunei
- Education: Universiti Brunei Darussalam; King's College London
- Occupation: Politician; activist

Khairunnisa binti Haji Ash'ari (born 1987) is a Bruneian activist and politician, known for her work on environmentalism and women's rights. In Brunei and the surrounding region, Khairunnisa actively supports environmental sustainability and youth development. She presently holds the positions of general manager for RECOVER, co-founder and director of community engagement for Green Brunei, and director of the Green Xchange for the Society for Community Outreach and Training in addition to serving on the Brunei Legislative Council.

== Early life and education ==
Khairunnisa was born in 1987 in Brunei. She graduated from the Universiti Brunei Darussalam in 2011. She later studied at King's College London through a Chevening Scholarship, graduating with a master's degree in environment, politics, and globalization in 2016.

== Activism ==
Khairunnisa first became involved in activism around 2011. In 2012, she co-founded Green Brunei, a youth-centered environmentalist group. She later served as director of another environmental initiative, Green Xchange. Additionally, Ash'ari was a member of the Brunei Youth Council and co-led the ASEAN Young Professionals Volunteer Corps.

Khairunnisa won the Bruneian sultan's Youth Service Award in 2013 and the ASEAN Youth Day Award in 2014. Then, in 2015, she became the first Bruneian to receive the Queen's Young Leaders Award. In 2017, she was appointed as a member of the Legislative Council of Brunei, holding a functional seat reserved for individuals who have achieved distinction in their professional lives. At the time, she was the council's youngest member. On the council, Ash'ari has served as an advocate for women's rights in Brunei. She has fought for better protections against sexual harassment and argued that women should be eligible to become village heads. On 12 April 2022, the Department of Councils of State declared that the appointed members of the LegCo were dissolved on 6 March.

== Initiatives ==
At a Legislative Council meeting in March 2021, Khairunnisa has been promoting sexual harassment awareness, furthered the #MeToo agenda. She demanded that a code of conduct be implemented by the Prime Minister's Office to stop sexual harassment in both the public and private sectors. In order to combat sexual harassment in the workplace, the Minister in the Prime Minister's Office has addressed the problem and is developing guidelines. However, it is uncertain whether regulations without consequences for offenders can serve as a reliable check.

== Views ==
Khairunnisa Ash'ari inquired in August 2015 as to why logging continued despite the Minister of Industry and Primary Resources' recent declaration that the Forestry Department would cease logging in forest reserves in order to protect the environment during the Legislative Council meeting earlier that year. She told the Brunei Times that year:

Brunei is blessed to have our rainforest, which has the capability to reduce the impact of climate change by absorbing carbon dioxide in the air and preventing an increase in global temperatures. Why are our peatswamp forests still being cut down? Do the economic benefits outweigh the environmental impact? Are there no other solutions to commercialise our rainforest resources without destroying them? We have only felt a small impact of climate change in our country. But we need to look beyond our borders. Disasters happening in the region may affect us severely when we think of food security and other areas of regional concerns. We may be a group of young people with limited experience and resources, but we, and our future generations, will be the ones who have to pay the price in the future if we do not take concrete actions now.

— Khairunnisa binti Haji Ash'ari, The Brunei Times

== Awards and honours ==
Throughout her career, she has received the following:

=== Awards ===
- ZICO ASEAN 40 Under 40 (2018)
- Queen's Young Leader Award (2015)
- Youth Service Award (2013)
- ASEAN Youth Day Award (2014)

=== Honours ===
- Order of Setia Negara Brunei Fourth Class (PSB)
- Excellent Service Medal (PIKB; 2016)
