= Tanyaradzwa Daringo =

- Born: 1992 (age 33–34)
- Citizenship: Namibia
- Education: University of Namibia
- Occupations: Public Relations Manager; Poet
- Awards: Queen's Young Leader Award

Tanyaradzwa Daringo (born 1992) is a public relations professional and poet from Namibia. In 2015 she was selected as a recipient of the Queen's Young Leader Award.

== Biography ==
Daringo was born in Zimbabwe in 1992, but was brought up in Windhoek. She attended Constancia Private Primary School, Holy Cross Convent Primary School and Academia Secondary School, where she was Deputy Head Girl. She studied Journalism at the University of Namibia.

In 2013, Daringo was the youngest ever Moremi Initiative for Women's Leadership (MILEAD) fellow, which provides support for women to pursue leadership roles. She was only the second ever Namibian to be nominated for the fellowship. This led to her nomination in 2014 as one of the top 30 future African leaders. In 2015 she featured as one of Buzzfeed's "28 Badass Young People Making the World Better".

=== Queen's Young Leader Award ===
Daringo was awarded the Queen's Young Leader Award in 2015 for her founding the non-profit feminist organisation "Her Liberty Namibia" for empowering Namibian young women. "Her Liberty Namibia" particularly addresses gender inequalities in Namibia. Her role models include the human rights lawyer Nyaradzayi Gumbonzvanda and the writer Chinua Achebe.

=== Poetry ===
In addition to her work in communications, Daringo is also a spoken work poet. She has collaborated with the singer Roya Diehl to combine poetry and music into new forms, which draw attention to women's lives in Namibia. Their interpretation of 'Summertime' by Ella Fitzgerald demonstrates the differences inequalities that exist between Namibian women. Her work has been published in the journal of Sister Namibia.

== Career ==
In 2019, the Fashion Council of Namibia appointed Daringo to its Board, due to her experience founding and running the PR company Zeronine Media.
