= Kavindya Thennakoon =

Sri Lankan activist (born 1995)

- Born: 1995 (age 30–31); Colombo, Sri Lanka
- Education: Anthropology
- Alma mater: Lyceum International School Wellesley College
- Occupations: Community Development and Youth Activist
- Years active: 2011 onwards
- Organization: Without Borders
- Known for: Youth Capacity Building
- Awards: Queen's Young Leader Award, Global Trailblazer Award
- Honours: Gender Equality Adviser at United Nations Youth Advisory Panel
- Website: withoutborderslk.org

Kavindya Thennakoon (born 1995) is a Sri Lankan community development and youth activist. She has been associated with both Youth Service America and the United Nations Youth Advisory Panel.

== Early life ==
Kavindya Thennakoon was born in 1995 in Colombo, Sri Lanka, to Upali and Champa Thennakoon. Her father was murdered when she was two years old and she was raised by her mother. Thennakoon attended the Lyceum International School in Nugegoda. In 2011, she was awarded by the Cambridge Assessment International Education for scoring the highest results in the Ordinary Level (O/L) Examination and placing highest in the Sociology and Environmental Management studies. In 2013, she was one of the top four scorers in the world on the Cambridge International Examinations.

While still in school, she began working on community development programs to provide libraries and books for schools.

In 2012 she won the Bronze Medal in the 100-meter hurdles event at the International Schools Athletic Championships.

Thennakoon graduated from Wellesley College in 2019 with a major in Anthropology and a minor in Cinema and Media Studies. She was the student speaker at the 2019 Wellesley College commencement.

== Activism and work ==
In August 2011, Thennakoon chaired a program with the Model United Club to donate books to preschools. Initially, the program was for schools in Vennappuva, but Thennakoon added the pre-school at the Kahanavita Primary School in Deraniyagala, when she realised their library had few books and no tables or chairs. The project, which lasted until April 2012, renovated the library, provided chairs and tables and donated books. After completion of the Deraniyagala library, she began working to provide a library to Dangampola Maha Vidyalaya (MV), Kegalle.

In 2012, she began volunteering at The Warehouse Project initiated by Beyond Borders in Maradana, which provides free English classes to children from grades 1 to 8. Thennakoon taught grade 8. She volunteered at the Stop the Violence Campaign in Sri Lanka sponsored by the Girl Guides.

In 2014, she was selected to serve on Youth Service America's Global Youth Council, which develops programs for youth to implement changes in their own communities. The same year, Thennakoon was chosen as one of the members of the United Nations Youth Advisory Panel (UNYAP) as a Gender Equality adviser.

She co-founded a community development project, Without Borders, with Sakie Ariyawansa, which began a pilot project in July 2014 at Kahanavita, Daraniyagala. The initiative is a grassroots effort to improve capacity building, language skills, and personal development opportunities for youth living in areas of high unemployment. From the pilot, the project spread to 5 villages and serviced over 200 children.

== Awards and recognition ==
In 2014, Without Borders won the Global Trailblazer Award from the student society Harvard Social Innovation Collaborative. Subsequently the Queen's Young Leader Award was awarded for creating Without Borders, a community service project that she designed to improve education and prospects for disadvantaged youth.
