= Maharani's Arts and Commerce College for Women, Mysore =

- Type: Public
- Established: 1902
- Affiliations: University of Mysore
- Location: Mysore, Karnataka, India
- Campus: Urban
- Website: http://www.maharanisartsandcommercecollegemysore.com

Maharani's Arts and Commerce College for Women, Mysore, is a women's general degree college located at Mysore, Karnatka. It was established in the year 1902. The college is affiliated with University of Mysore. This college offers different undergraduate and postgraduate courses in arts and commerce.

== Departments ==
Journalism and Mass Communication, Philosophy, Economics, English, Geography, History, Kannada, Music, Political Science, Psychology, Sociology. Urdu, Hindi, Sanskrit, criminology and forensic science.

== Accreditation ==
The college is recognized by the University Grants Commission (UGC). Accreditation by University of Mysore, Mysuru

Notable Alumins

- Triveni (Anusuya Shankar)
