= Chellagurki =

- Village
- Location in Karnataka, India Chellagurki (India)
- Coordinates: 11.599341°N 78.597752°E
- Country: India
- State: Karnataka
- District: Bellary
- Elevation: 212 m (696 ft)

Languages
  - Official: Kannada
- Time zone: UTC+5:30 (IST)
- PIN: 583 001
- Telephone code: 08392

Chellagurki is a Village in the Bellary Taluk in the Bellary district in the state of Karnataka, India.

== Introduction ==
Economy of Chellagurki mainly depends on the agriculture. They mainly grow crops like Bengal gram, coriander, cotton, ground-nuts, jowar, millet, soybean, and Pigen peas.

As of 2001 India census, Chellagurki had a population of 2340. Males constitute 55% (1281) of the population and females 45% (1059). Chellagurki has an average literacy rate of 77%, higher than the national average of 59.5%;

== Transportation ==
=== Airport ===
Nearest airport is Bellary Airport which is 25 km away from Chellagurki.

=== Railway Station ===
Nearest railway station is at k virapur and Guntakal Junction which is 10 km away from Chellagurki. All trains coming from chennai also go through Guntakal Junction only.

== Places of worship ==
=== Shri Yerrithatha Temple ===
Dasara festival used to be celebrated yearly in this temple. and 'Jatre' (in Kannada) also one among widely celebrated festival in Chellagurki and which happens twice in a year.

=== Jeeva Smadhi of Yerri Thatha saint ===
Shri YerriThatha the great saint who arrived and lived for 25 years in Chellagurki village died there in 1922. The Samadhi of Shri Yerrithatha attract people from all over the State and on every no moon.
