= Elizabeth Kite (activist) =

Tongan youth leader

Elizabeth Kite is an advocate, environmentalist and a leader in the Pacific region from Tonga, who founded Take The Lead, Tonga's first youth-led Non Government Organisation, that empowers the voices of young and vulnerable people in Tonga. In 2017 she was presented with a Queens Young Leader Award, and in 2023 became Tonga's first Obama Foundation Scholar, at Columbia University, New York.

== Biography ==
Kite was born in New Zealand, but grew up in London then Tonga, where she attended primary school, and in Australia, where she attended secondary school. In 2013 she moved to Tonga to work for non-governmental organisations there.

In 2017 Kite founded Take The Lead, formerly known as Tonga Youth Leaders, an organisation that enables young Tongans' voices to be amplified through training and grant provision. In 2018 Kite spoke out about the issues surrounding drug use for young people in Tonga. In September 2018 Take The Lead launched its She Leads Fale Alea (Parliament) programme, officially launched by the late Princess Mele Siu'ilikutapu, the Pacific Islands only practice parliament for female youth Its mission is to address the low representation of women in Tongan politics.

In 2017 Kite was awarded a Queen's Young Leader Award, in recognition of her work on community empowerment. Her award was presented by Queen Elizabeth II. Kite wore a traditional tapa which her mother had worn when the Queen first visited Tonga in 1953.

Kite served as the Pacific Regional Representative for the Commonwealth Youth Council from 2018 to 2021.

In 2022, she became the first Tongan and Pacific Islander invited to speak as a special guest at the Commonwealth Day Service, hosted by the Royal Commonwealth Society at Westminster Abbey.
