= Abrahim Simmonds =

- Born: 3 March 1994 (age 31); St Ann Parish
- Education: The University of the West Indies; Swansea University

Abrahim Simmonds is a Jamaican youth activist who acted as the 7th National Coordinator for the Governor-General’s Programme for Excellence in Jamaica from 2020 to 2023. He was awarded the Queen's Young Leader Award for Jamaica in 2017 and received the Governor-General's Medal of Honour in 2023. Abrahim is also co-founder of the youth advocacy group JAYECAN.
