= Josephine Nabukenya =

Ugandan HIV/AIDS activist

- Born: 1993 (age 32–33); Kampala, Uganda
- Education: Makarere University
- Occupation: Social activist

Josephine Nabukenya is a Ugandan HIV/AIDS activist who is also living with HIV/AIDS. She serves as a Stephen Lewis Foundation Youth program coordinator at Makerere University Johns Hopkins University (MUJHU). She was awarded the Queen’s Young Leader Award in 2016 for her advocacy work. She is an ambassador at Elizabeth Glaser Pediatric AIDS Foundation (EGPAF)'s Ariel Club. She is one of the young leaders who grew from being timid to a resilient and powerful young leader who encourages other children to live positively and take their pills.

== Background life ==
Josephine Nabukenya was born in 1993 in Kampala. Her mother was HIV positive and passed the condition on to her daughters. Nabukenya only learnt of this in 2001, at age eight, when her mother, terminally ill from HIV complications, wrote a last will, reasoning that she had kept it a secret because HIV treatment would never be available to her children. Nabukenya ultimately survived, due to emergency antiretroviral therapy at Makerere University. She, her mother, father, and younger sister all have HIV; both Josephine and her sister became infected at birth.

== Going public ==
In 2004, when the President's Emergency Plan for AIDS Relief (PEPFAR) began providing HIV/AIDS treatment in Uganda, Nabukenya made her health status public and began seeking treatment. Her mother became a community health worker to advise other women with HIV/AIDS on getting treatment to ensure that their pregnancies carry no risk of HIV infection.

Nabukenya was introduced to the Elizabeth Glaser Pediatric AIDS Foundation's Ariel Club when she began an antiretroviral therapy at a local hospital. She later became an Ariel Club facilitator, leading sessions to help other children accept their own HIV status and seek the treatment they needed. At Ariel, she used her story to help guide others to overcome the challenges of a life with HIV. She also used her confidence in the promise of her own life, which grew stronger. Nabukenya has continued as an ambassador for EGPAF through her work with Ariel Clubs in Uganda to speak in front of members of the U.S. Congress. Her story inspires other people to learn about HIV and fight the stigma and discrimination around the disease.

Nabukenya watched her mother, Margaret Lubega, battle with illness. She went to Mulago National Referral Hospital, where she asked to be tested. She was too young to realise what was taking place, and only recalls going to hospital and playing with children there as they shared cake and soft drinks.

She started Young General Alive (YGA), an organisation that initially constituted Lubega, another mother and her child, and another patient they had met at Mulago hospital during a visit. In 2005, Makerere University - Johns Hopkins University Research Collaboration (Mujhu) helped them to formalise their group.

== Education ==
Nabukenya is a degree holder in Social Work from Makerere University in Kampala.

== Career life ==
In 2005, under EGPAF, Nabukenya represented children both infected and affected by HIV/aids in the US Congress.

== See also ==
- Queen's Young Leader Award
- Stephen Lewis Foundation
- Elizabeth Glaser Pediatric AIDS Foundation
