= Nthanda Manduwi =

Malawian entrepreneur and author

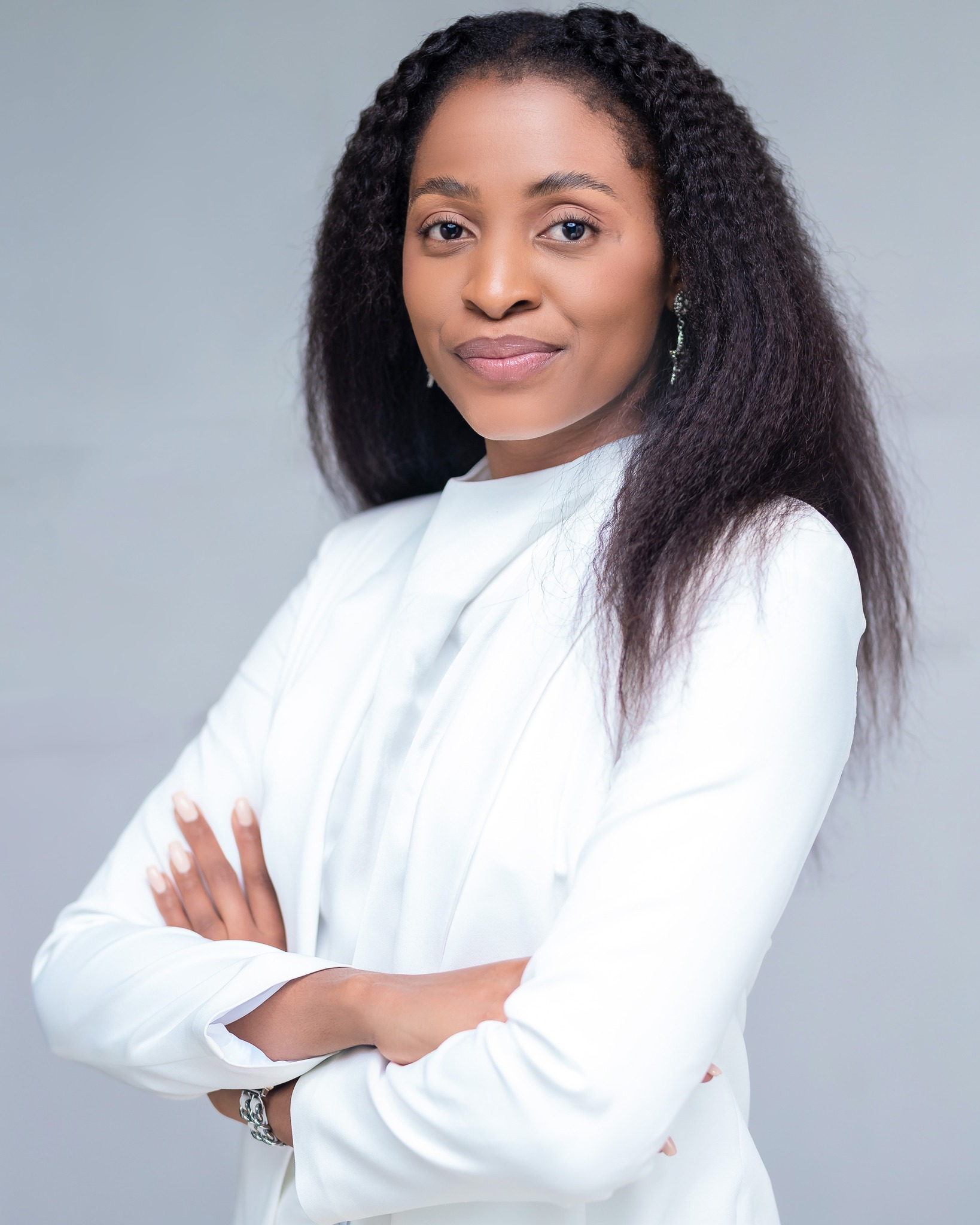
- Born: Mangochi District, Malawi
- Education: Michigan State University (MBA) Malawi University of Science and Technology (MSc, Entrepreneurship) University of Malawi (BSocSc, Economics & Demography)
- Alma mater: Michigan State University
- Occupations: Entrepreneur, Author
- Years active: 2013–present
- Known for: Digital Transformation, Systems Thinking
- Notable work: Lessons Book Series
- Awards: Most Inspiring Business Leader in Malawi (2026 Consumer Choice Awards)
- Honours: 2026 Rockefeller Big Bets Africa Fellow
- Website: nthanda.com

Nthanda Manduwi is a Malawian systems entrepreneur and author. She is a former United Nations employee, and the founder and Chief Executive Officer of Q2 Systems. Prior, she founded the Ntha Foundation, Bien Corporation, and the Kwathu Kollective. Her companies specialise in technology innovation and youth employment. She is the author of ten books.

== Early life and education ==
Manduwi was born in Mangochi, a district on the shores of the Lake Malawi. Her father is of Sena descent, and her mother was Tumbuka. Her mother became Malawi's first female marine captain in 1997, while her father worked as a marine engineer. She graduated with a Bachelor of Social Science, dual-majoring in Economics and Demography from the University of Malawi.

She earned a Master of Science in Entrepreneurship from the Malawi University of Science and Technology in 2024. Her thesis was on “The Entrepreneurial Opportunity in Malawi’s Digital Transformation: Modelling Public Information Management Systems for Development”, which was published in the Advances in Sciences and Arts journal. She later earned a STEM-designated Master of Business Administration (Marketing and Business Analytics dual-concentration) from Michigan State University's Eli Broad College of Business in 2026.

== Career and entrepreneurship ==
Manduwi created her personal blog: By Ntha in 2013, which later evolved into Bien Corporation. In 2017, she hosted ‘My Malawi’ on Zodiak Television - a show about culture and tourism.

In 2018, Manduwi joined the Malawi Revenue Authority as a Revenue (Tax) Officer. She later founded Ntha Foundation to address youth digital skills and innovation programming. This work expanded into an US-registered 501(c)(3) (not-for-profit) organisation, and the Malawian arm of the work pivoted to the Kwathu Kollective.

In 2021, Manduwi worked on World Bank-supported programming through initiatives in Malawi. A US$250,000 grant by the Public Private Partnership Commission, she led programs which included Digital Skills for Africa and the Kwathu Innovation & Creative Centre, which focused on digital literacy, entrepreneurship, innovation, and employability.

From 2022 to 2024, Manduwi worked with the United Nations Development Programme. She was selected for the inaugural UNDP Graduate Programme from a global applicant pool of 38,709 and was one of 18 participants deployed in 2022. She was seconded to the UNDP Independent Evaluation Office in New York, where she worked on evaluation and synthesis. Her work included support to the 2022 Malawi Independent Country Programme Evaluation and knowledge coordination for the Global SDG Synthesis Coalition.

In 2025, Manduwi joined Microsoft Xbox as a Business Development Manager for their summer internship program as part of her MBA, working with the ID@Xbox ecosystem. Her work entailed market analysis, global expansion research, and analysis of game titles and regional developer ecosystems. Her work also included business intelligence, ecosystem analysis, and strategic research related to global developer participation and market expansion.

In 2026, she was awarded the Detroit Tech Residency Fellowship, and she was building Q2 Systems - a cyber-physical infrastructure company developing digital twins, simulation platforms, and autonomous systems for emerging markets. Q2 is building Kwathu Smart Innovation Farms - AI-powered simulation tools and hands-on training to increase productivity, strengthen food security, and build climate-resilient production systems.

== Writing and advocacy ==
Manduwi published her first book in 2018, By the End of Your Teens. This was later followed by a sequel in 2025: Traversing Your Terrible Twenties

In 2025, Nthanda published her third book Feminine Silence at the 80th United Nations General Assembly. The book builds on Manduwi's work in women's empowerment - exploring what happens when women enter male-dominated spaces of power, only to find sharp terrain under their feet.

In a side event at the 2025 UNGA, Waihiga Mwaura led a Town Hall on the future of artificial intelligence and work in Africa. Manduwi was one of the panellists on the program which was broadcast on BBC News Africa. The other panelist were the Ahunna Eziakonwa - special advisor on Africa to the United Nation Secretary General Antonio Guterres, Dr. ’Bosun Tijani - Federal Minister of Communication and Digital Economy of Nigerian, and Dr. Amal El Fallah Seghrouchni - Minister Delegate to the Head of Government in Charge of Digital Transformation and Administrative Reform.

Manduwi's seven-part Lessons book series was published on the 6th of July 2026 - Malawi's 62nd Independence Day, extending themes further explored through her podcast: the Lessons Conversation. Lessons is dialogue series originally piloted during her work at the United Nations Development Programme. The podcast and book series examine international development, aid, power, institutional systems, and the Global South through seven books: 1. Lessons, 2. Beggars in Suits, 3. Systemic Nonsense, 4. Impossible Economies, 5. So Wrong for So Long, 6. We Are Still at War, and 7. A New Normal.

In alignment with the book series, she delivered a TEDxTalk at Michigan State University on how human ego, rather than intelligence or technological capability, is the ultimate bottleneck to global progress.

== Awards, fellowships and honours ==
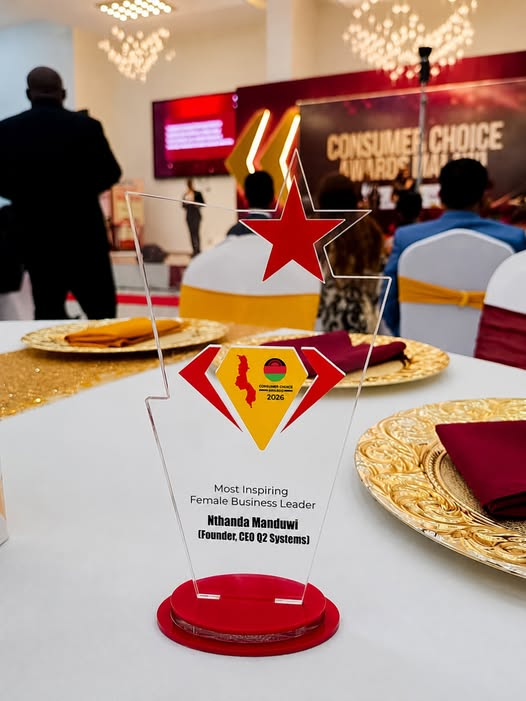
Nthanda Manduwi gains award in 2026

In 2013, she was crowned as Miss University of Malawi, and in 2017 she was first runner-up in the Miss Malawi pageant. She represented Malawi in the 2017 South Korean World Miss University beauty pageant, and won the Best Speech Award out of 81 participants.

In 2020, she was awarded African Woman Media Icon Of The Year at the Future Women Conference in Lagos, Nigeria. and in the following year she became a DStv's Malawi Digital Ambassador. She was also featured in Susan Dalgety's book: the Spirit of Malawi.

In 2024, she received the Best Youth Empowerment Award at the African Achievement Awards. She also recognised as one of the Most Influential People of African Descent at the 79th United Nations General Assembly, and she was selected as part of the Africa Climate Ambassadors Programme.

In 2026, Manduwi was selected for the Rockefeller Foundation's Africa Big Bets Fellowship, and the Detroit Tech Residency and she was voted for as the Most Inspiring Female Business Leader at the Consumer choice awards.
