= Sandra Nabaggala =

Ugandan beach Wood-ball player

- Born: 12 December 1994 (age 31)
- Citizenship: Uganda
- Occupations: beach Wood-ball player and news anchor
- Known for: Sports
- Awards: Miss Tourism Talent in 2019/2020

Sandra Nabaggala also known as Rose Sandra Nabaggala (born 12 December 1994) is a Ugandan beach Wood-ball player and a news anchor.

== Early life ==
Sandra Nabaggala was born on 12 December 1994 to Deziranta Bagwanabaira .

== Career ==
Nabaggala made her international debut in wood-ball at the inaugural Beach Wood-ball World Cup in 2017 (Indonesia) and in that debut tournament, she finished in 15th place. In 2019, when Uganda hosted the Beach Wood-ball World Cup, she won a bronze in singles and a team gold.

In July 2024, she was announced to represent Uganda at a Woodball World Cup in China.

Nabaggala is a news anchor for BBS TV, hosting the “Gambuuze” show. She previously ran a cultural dance troupe, and she also competed in a beauty contest and was crowned “Miss Tourism Talent 2019/20.”

== Awards and Honors ==
Nabaggala won the maiden women singles category title at Ndejje wood-ball open.

Team Gold – 2019 Beach Woodball World Cup: She was part of the Ugandan women’s team that won team gold in the stroke event at the 2019 World Cup.

Miss Tourism Talent 2019/20, Nabaggala was crowned Miss Tourism Talent in 2019/2020.
