= Amal El Fallah Seghrouchni =

Moroccan politician and AI researcher

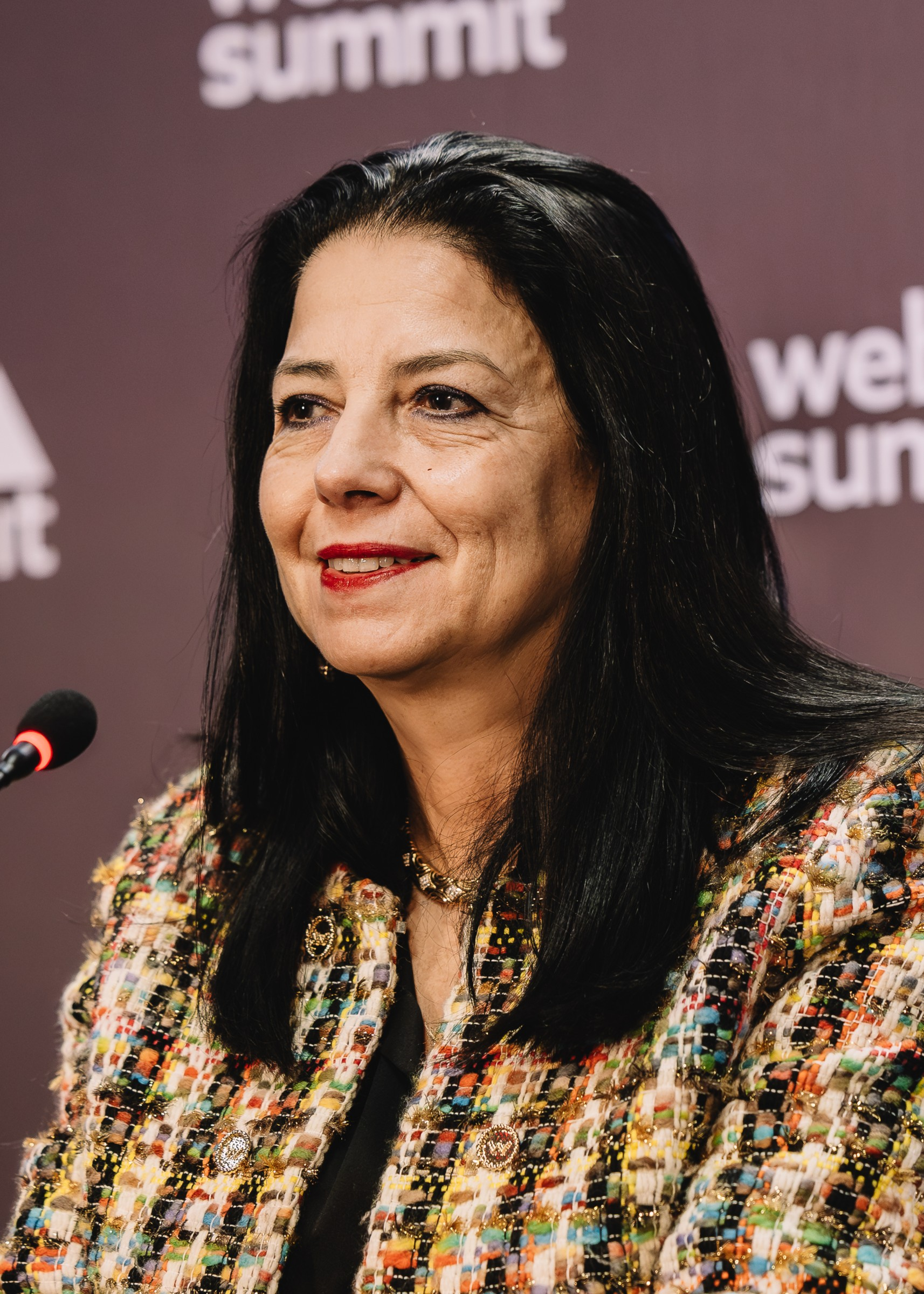
- Seghrouchni in 2024

Minister Delegate to the Head of Government in charge of Digital Transition and Administration Reform
- Incumbent
- Assumed office 23 October 2024
- Monarch: Mohammed VI of Morocco
- Prime Minister: Aziz Akhannouch
- Preceded by: Ghita Mezzour

Personal details
- Occupation: AI expert

Amal El Fallah Seghrouchni is a Moroccan expert in artificial intelligence, appointed in October 2024 as Minister Delegate to the Head of Government, in charge of Digital Transition and Administrative Reform in Morocco.

== Academic background ==
Amal El Fallah Seghrouchni holds a doctorate in computer science from Pierre and Marie Curie University (Paris VI) and an accreditation to supervise research (HDR) in artificial intelligence from Sorbonne Paris North University. She was an Exceptional Class Professor at Sorbonne University, where she led the Multi-Agent Systems (MAS) team within the Paris 6 Computer Science Laboratory (LIP6) for 15 years.

== Professional career ==
Alongside her academic work, she served as the Executive President of the International Artificial Intelligence Center of Morocco (AI Movement), affiliated with Mohammed VI Polytechnic University (UM6P). Under her leadership, the center was recognized as a Category II Center under the auspices of UNESCO for the African region.

== Contributions and awards ==
Amal El Fallah Seghrouchni is a major figure in distributed artificial intelligence. She has published over 200 scientific articles and supervised 41 doctoral theses. She is a member of the World Commission on the Ethics of Scientific Knowledge and Technology (COMEST) of UNESCO and was appointed to the Higher Council for Education, Training, and Scientific Research for the 2022–2027 term.

In 2021, she was nominated for the Berkeley World Business Analytics Award in the "Woman of the Year" category for the African continent.

== Ministerial commitment ==
As Minister Delegate, Amal El Fallah Seghrouchni is responsible for implementing the "Morocco Digital 2030" strategy, aiming notably at the deployment of 5G and the digital transformation of the public administration. Her expertise in artificial intelligence positions Morocco as a key player in digital innovation on the African continent.
