= Rakitha Malewana =

Sri Lankan scientist and youth activist

Rakitha Dilshan Malewana
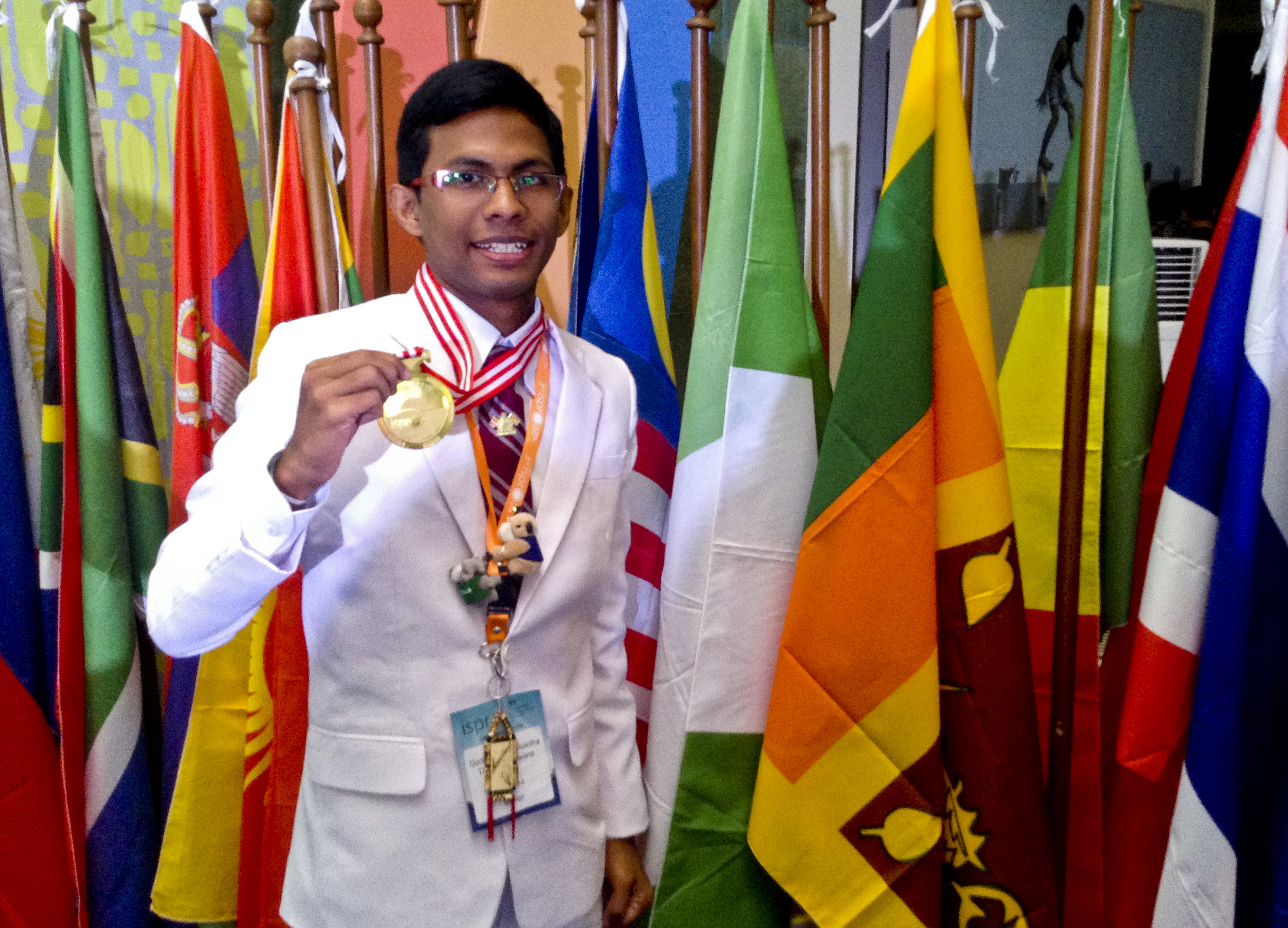
- Born: Kandy
- Education: Duke University,
- Employer: Duke Human Vaccine Institute
- Known for: Medical Research and Social Work

Rakitha Dilshan Malewana is a Sri Lankan scientist and youth activist. He was awarded the Nalanda Puthra award in 2015 from his alma mater Nalanda College, Colombo and received a presidential medal for innovation and social work from the government of Democratic Socialist Republic of Sri Lanka. In 2016, he was awarded the prestigious Queen's Young Leaders Award by the Royal Commonwealth Society as an honor to his social work on behalf of the HIV positive community. He is one of the youngest honorees of Forbes 30 under 30 Asia 2017.

== Achievements ==
Malewana does his medical research in collaboration with University of Colombo, Medical Research Institute Sri Lanka, National Science Foundation of Sri Lanka, Ministry of Health and Government Analyst's Department Sri Lanka.

He won a gold medal at the International Science Research Olympiad 2015 held in Jakarta, Indonesia in year 2015 and the same year he won another gold medal at the International Environment Sustainability Olympiad 2015, held in The Netherlands becoming the first Sri Lankan to win an Olympiad gold medal at an international competition.

His research on development of novel drug to kill leukemic cells won a bronze medal at the International Science Projects Olympiad 2014 held in Jakarta, Indonesia selected to represent Sri Lanka at the Intel International Science and Engineering Fair (Intel ISEF) which is one of the most prestigious science and engineering events in the world calendar for high school students.

In 2013, he became the national winner of Sri Lanka Science and Engineering Fair (SLSEF) for the second consecutive year for his preliminary study on developing an ayurvedic drug to treat thrombocytopenia and he represented his work at the Intel ISEF 2013 held in Arizona, USA.

== Activism ==
Malewana first started working with HIV/AIDS positive people in 2011 when he visited slum areas to teach sciences to the children of people living with HIV. In 2012, he founded ideanerd Sri Lanka, which encourages school children to get involved in science research and promote an innovation culture. So far, it has helped more than 50,000 students all over the country. In 2015, Rakitha co-founded United Youth Consortium to raise awareness of sexual and reproductive health issues and provide support and counseling to families living with HIV. His movements include fighting with the government to bring justice to HIV positive children who were banned to attend local schools. He is also an advocate for health disparities in developing countries. Malewana collaborate his social work with National STD/AIDS Control Programme Sri Lanka and UNAIDS Sri Lanka.

For his grassroot activism, he was awarded the prestigious Queen's Young Leaders Award in 2016. The Queen's Young Leaders Award is designed to inspire and nurture the talent of exceptional young people from all over the Commonwealth and they can create and lead others towards securing positive changes in communities. The award was presented by her majesty the queen Elizabeth II at the Buckingham Palace.
