= Wendy Omanga =

Kenyan climate change activist (born 1994)

- Born: 25 January 1994 (age 32); Kenya
- Citizenship: Kenyan
- Education: Political Science and Communication
- Alma mater: University of Nairobi
- Occupations: Model, Journalism
- Known for: Environmental activism

Wendy Omanga (born 25 January 1994) is a Kenyan youth and climate activist. She is also a journalist, model and a beauty Queen. She won Miss Journalism World Kenya in 2018 and became Miss Jungle Kenya in 2022. She was a recipient of Emerging Leaders Foundation on Digital Advocacy skills. The training was said to have prepared her as an advocate of Climate Action and Bamboo which she used in climate action engagement. She started the Moonlight Initiative, a non-governmental organization with a mission to make Africa climate aware in adopting climate smart practices. The initiative plans and organizes for farmers to produce different types of bamboo in support for gaining harvest resources and mitigating climate change.

== Early life and education ==
Wendy is from Nyando in Kisumu County where floods wash away homes. Her family home was washed away by flood. She studied Political Science and Communication at the University of Nairobi.

== Moonlight initiative and Bambooka Lifestyle Ltd ==
Wendy founded Moonlight Initiative LTD. She started a project called moonlight Initiative in 2021 which aimed to drive the establishment of restoration of bamboo. Through this initiative, the Bamboo villages were established in Kakamega county and was funded with 7000USD. The farmers planted 2,900 Bamboo seedlings to lessen the effects of climate change in Kenya. That same year, she became the consultant of TVET –CDAC for the development of bamboo curriculum for the Kenyan market. According to Africa Online Pageant, "Moonlight Initiative was one of the organizing partners of World Bamboo Day celebrations in Kibirong’ Wetlands, Nandi County. Making her organization the youngest partner in organizing World Bamboo Day event with The Ministry of Environment, KEFRI, INBAR, NETFUND, WETLANDS INTERNATIONAL, ECO GREEN CBO and other stakeholders in Kenya.

According to the UN, the expected impact on the Bamboo initiative is expected to

- Adopt a forest campaign by miss jungle Kenya 2022 through bringing stakeholders from the associations, governments, other stakeholders in promotion of climate change vision of 2030.
- Promote Water and Sanitation Programs
- Facilitate study Tour and Conferences for its members.
- Drive collaboration for Affordable Housing Bamboo Project.
- Draw curriculum for establishment of trees in nurseries, primary and high schools in Kenya as well setting up botanical gardens, fruit orchards, and vertical gardens to improve nutrition for school children.
- To plan for Bambooka Adventures with the partners. The partners include the Kenya Forest Research Institute, International Bamboo and Rattan Organisation, Billion Strong, YALI, USAID, Bambooka lifestyle ltd.

The Rockefeller Foundation stated that, "in her capacity as Miss Jungle Kenya 2022, she is an advocate for sustainable tourism, affordable bamboo housing technologies and environment conservation in East Africa as she champions for beauty with a purpose as "conservation meets tourism." She is a member of North American Association for Environment Education, and a board member at Climate Students Movement organization, Sweden, where she serves in the Communications Committee.

== Achievement ==
In 2022, Wendy won the Miss Jungle Kenya and is still the reigning Queen till date.

In December 2018, Wendy participated in an international beauty pageant in Arusha Tanzania. She won and was crowned as Miss Journalism World Kenya.

In 2020, Wendy was part of the first cohort of Young African Leaders Initiative (YALI- Regional Leadership Center- East Africa).

In 2019 she was appointed as a Global Goodwill Ambassador of Kenya because of her humanitarian activities and volunteerism.

She was one of the alumni classes of "Top 30 Under 30" who were recognized as drivers of environmental education that facilitate environmental literacy to people all over the world.

Wendy participated at the 1st Kenya Commercial Forestry Investment Conference & Expo at KEFRI Headquarters, Muguga-Kenya 23 - 26 November 2021.

Wendy was appointed as the National Secretary to Bamboo Association of Kenya.

She also became one of the Kenyan's UN FAO Forest Carbon Champion (2022-2023). She won the CNN Academy trained best climate storyteller.

Wendy was the reporter of the Kenya Rafting Federation Africa Championship 2025! that took place from 14 to 20 July 2025 at the Rapids Camp Sagana.

Wendy participated in the Economy of Francesco event in September 2022 in Assisi, Italy.
