= Clean technology =

Any process, product, or service that reduces negative environmental impacts

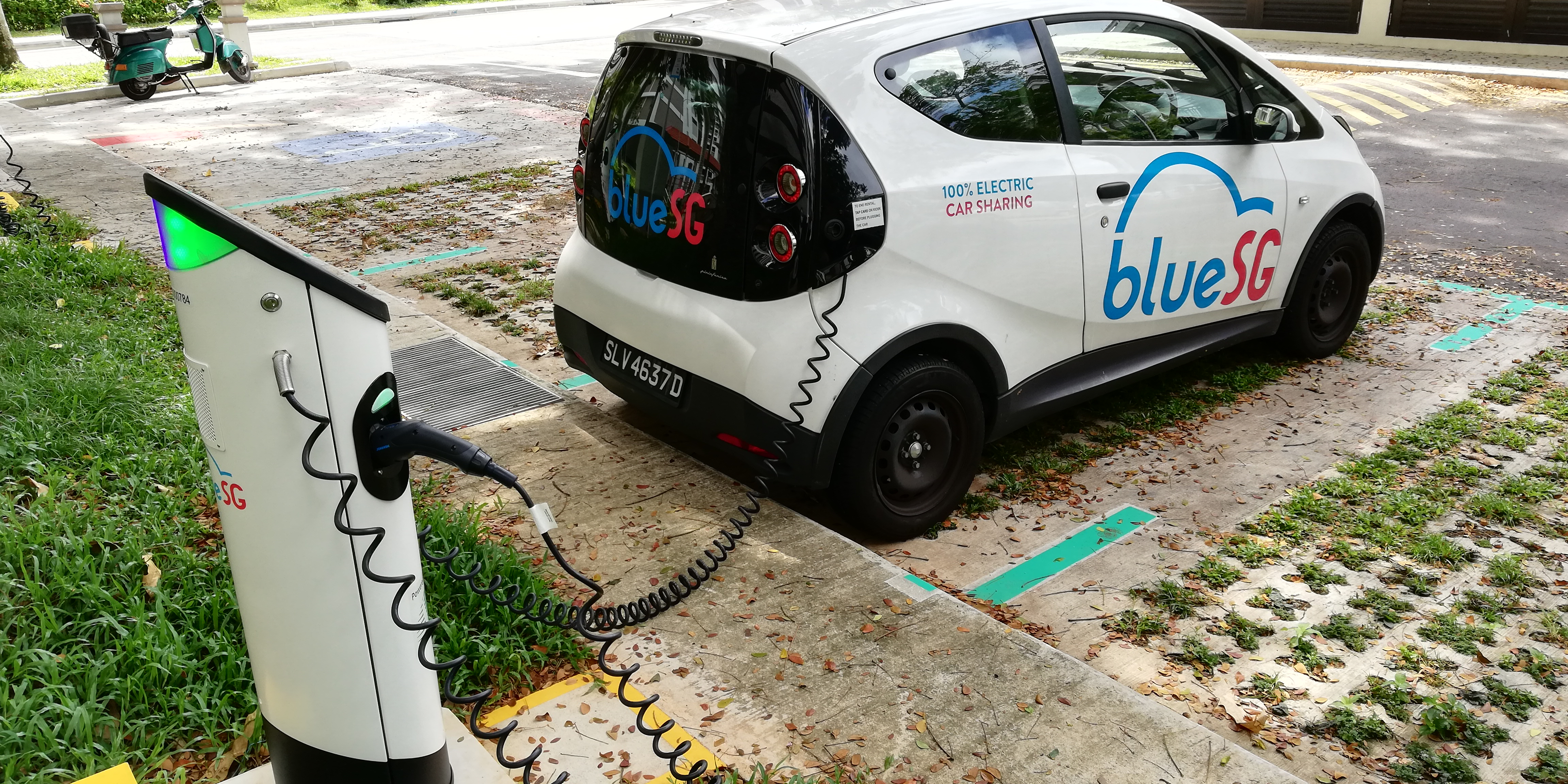
Fully electric car charging its battery at a public charging station

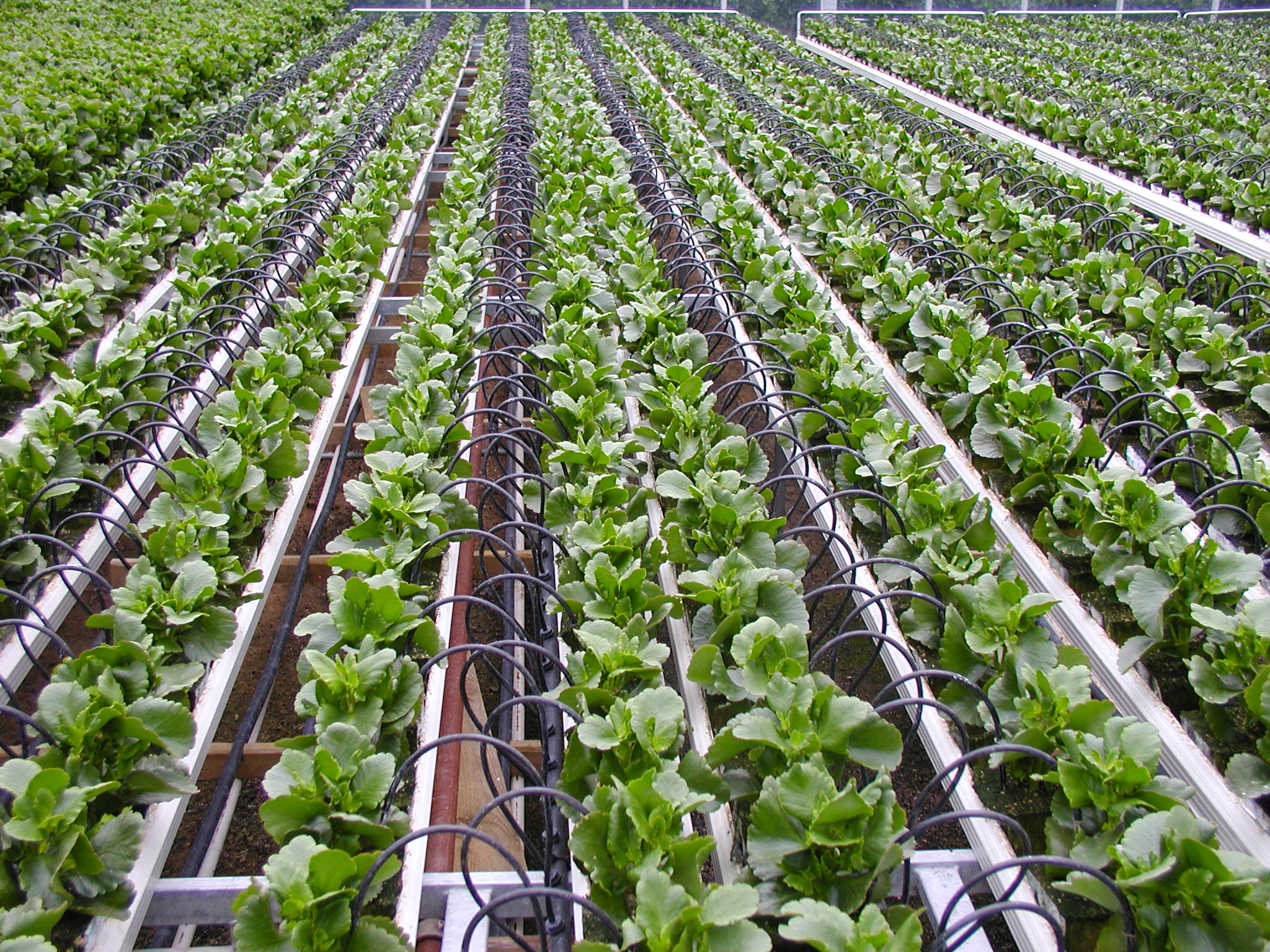
Netafim, drip irrigation

Clean technology, also called cleantech or climate tech, refers to products, services, and processes that reduce negative environmental impacts through improved energy efficiency, sustainable resource use, or environmental protection. It includes a broad range of technologies related to recycling, renewable energy, information technology, green transportation, electric motors, green chemistry, lighting, grey water, and more.

Clean technology developed in response to concerns about climate change, pollution, and the environmental impacts of industrialization, particularly those associated with fossil fuel use, and has played a role in reducing greenhouse gas emissions.

The sector includes industries such as solar and wind energy, biofuels, energy storage, and circular economy technologies.

== History ==
The idea of cleantech first emerged among a group of emerging technologies and industries, based on principles of biology, resource efficiency, and second-generation production concepts in basic industries. Examples include energy efficiency, selective catalytic reduction, non-toxic materials, water purification, solar energy, wind energy, and new paradigms in energy conservation. Since the 1990s, interest in these technologies has increased with two trends.Once is a decline in the relative cost of these technologies and a growing understanding of the link between industrial design used in the 19th century and early 20th centuries—such as fossil fuel power plants, the internal combustion engine, and chemical manufacturing—and an emerging understanding of human-caused impact on earth systems resulting from their use (see articles: ozone hole, acid rain, desertification, climate change, and global warming).

Clean Edge, a clean technology research firm, describes clean technology as "a diverse range of products, services, and processes that harness renewable materials and energy sources, dramatically reduce the use of natural resources, and cut or eliminate emissions and wastes." Clean Edge notes that, "Clean technologies are competitive with, if not superior to, their conventional counterparts. Many also offer significant additional benefits, notably their ability to improve the lives of those in both developed and developing countries."

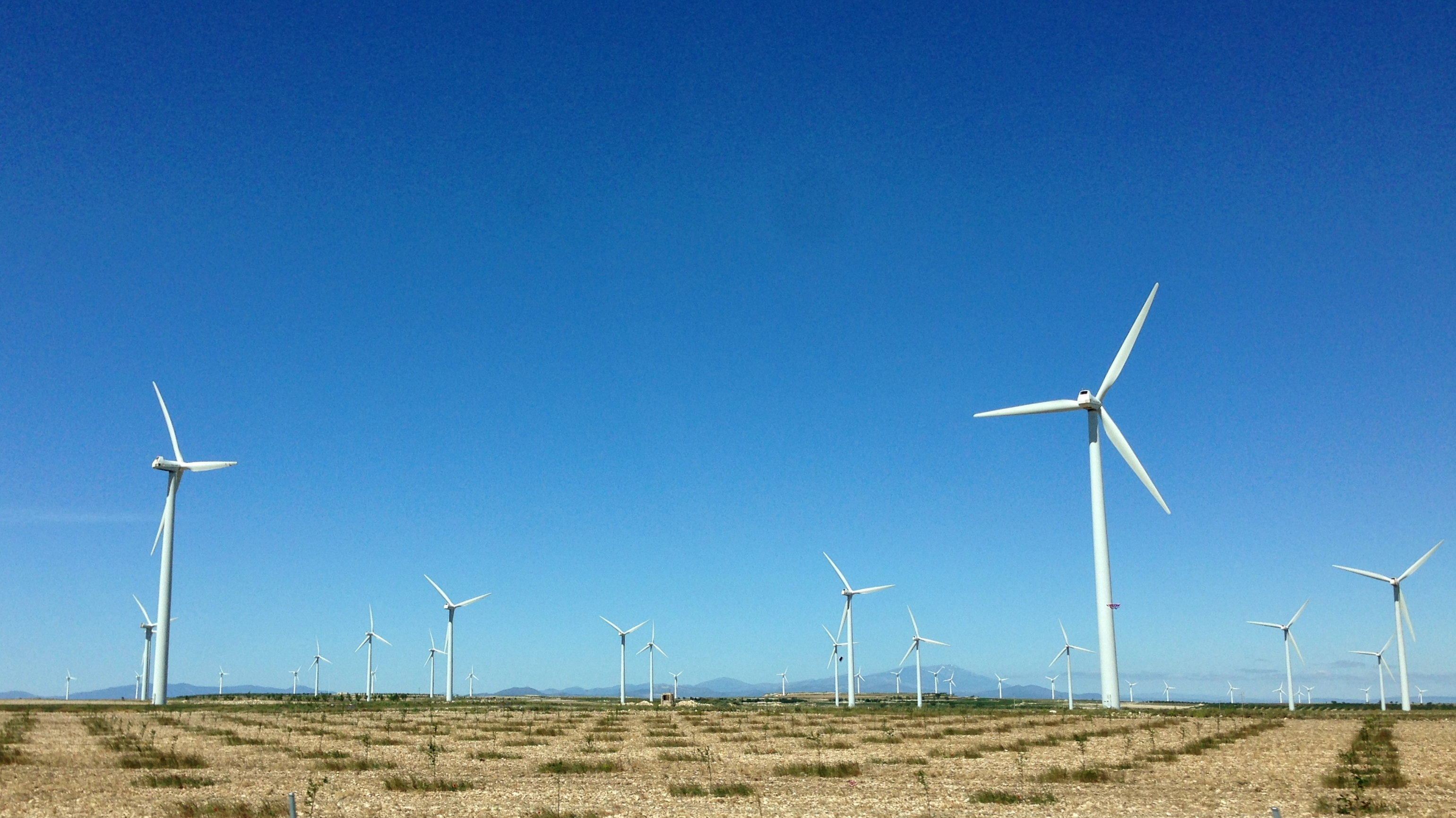
Wind turbines in a field in Spain

Investments in clean technology have grown considerably since coming into the spotlight around 2000. According to the United Nations Environment Program, wind, solar, and biofuel companies received a record $148 billion in new funding in 2007, as rising oil prices and climate change policies encouraged investment in renewable energy. $50 billion of that funding went to wind power. Overall, investment in clean-energy and energy-efficiency industries rose 60 percent from 2006 to 2007. In 2009, Clean Edge forecasted that the three main clean technology sectors—solar photovoltaics, wind power, and biofuels—would have revenues of $325.1 billion by 2018.

Clean technology has also emerged as an essential topic among businesses and companies. It can reduce pollutants and dirty fuels for every company, regardless of which industry they are in, and using clean technology has become a competitive advantage. Through building their Corporate Social Responsibility (CSR) goals, they participate in using clean technology and other means by promoting sustainability. Fortune Global 500 firms spent around $20 billion a year on CSR activities in 2018.

There are two major stages when cleantech patenting has advanced. The first is from 2006 to 2021, driven by the EU and Japan (27% and 26% of overall increase in IPFs). The next stage is from 2017 to 2021, led by China, which accounted for 70% of the increase in IPFs.

Silicon Valley, Tel Aviv and Stockholm were ranked as leading ecosystems in the field of clean technology. According to data from 2024, there are over 750,000 international patent families (IPFs) focused on clean and sustainable technologies worldwide. This represents approximately 12% of the total number of IPFs globally. From 1997 to 2021, over 750,000 patents for clean and sustainable technologies were published, making up almost 15% of all patents in 2021, compared to just under 8% in 1997. Japan and the US each account for over 20% of clean technology patents, though their annual numbers have stabilized at around 10,000.

== Definition and terminology ==
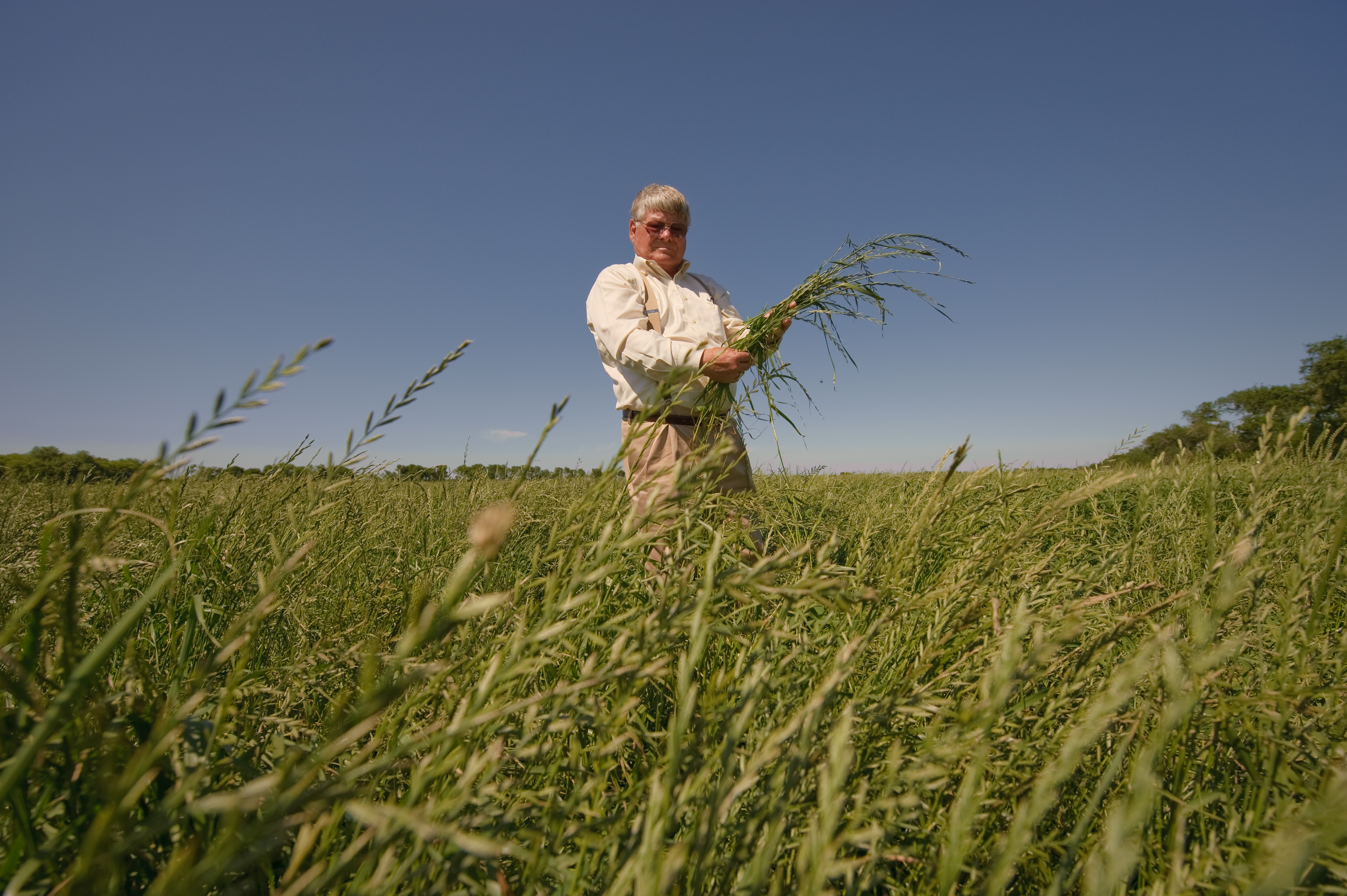
Farmer using crops for biofuel

Cleantech products or services are those that improve operational performance, productivity, or efficiency while reducing costs, inputs, energy consumption, waste, or environmental pollution. Its origins are the increased consumer, regulatory, and industry interest in clean forms of energy generation—specifically, perhaps, the rise in awareness of global warming, climate change, and the impact on the natural environment caused by the burning of fossil fuels. Cleantech is often associated with venture capital funds and land use organizations. The term traditionally been differentiated from various definitions of green business, sustainability, or triple bottom line industries by its origins in the venture capital investment community and has grown to define a business sector that includes significant and high growth industries such as solar, wind, water purification, and biofuels.

Environmental finance is a method by which new clean technology projects can obtain financing through the generation of carbon credits. A project that is developed with concern for climate change mitigation is also known as a carbon project.

=== Nomenclature ===
While the expanding industry has grown rapidly in recent years and attracted billions of dollars of capital, the clean technology space has not settled on an agreed-upon term. Cleantech is used fairly widely, although variant spellings include ⟨clean-tech⟩ and ⟨clean tech⟩. In recent years, some clean technology companies have de-emphasized that aspect of their business to tap into broader trends, such as smart cities.

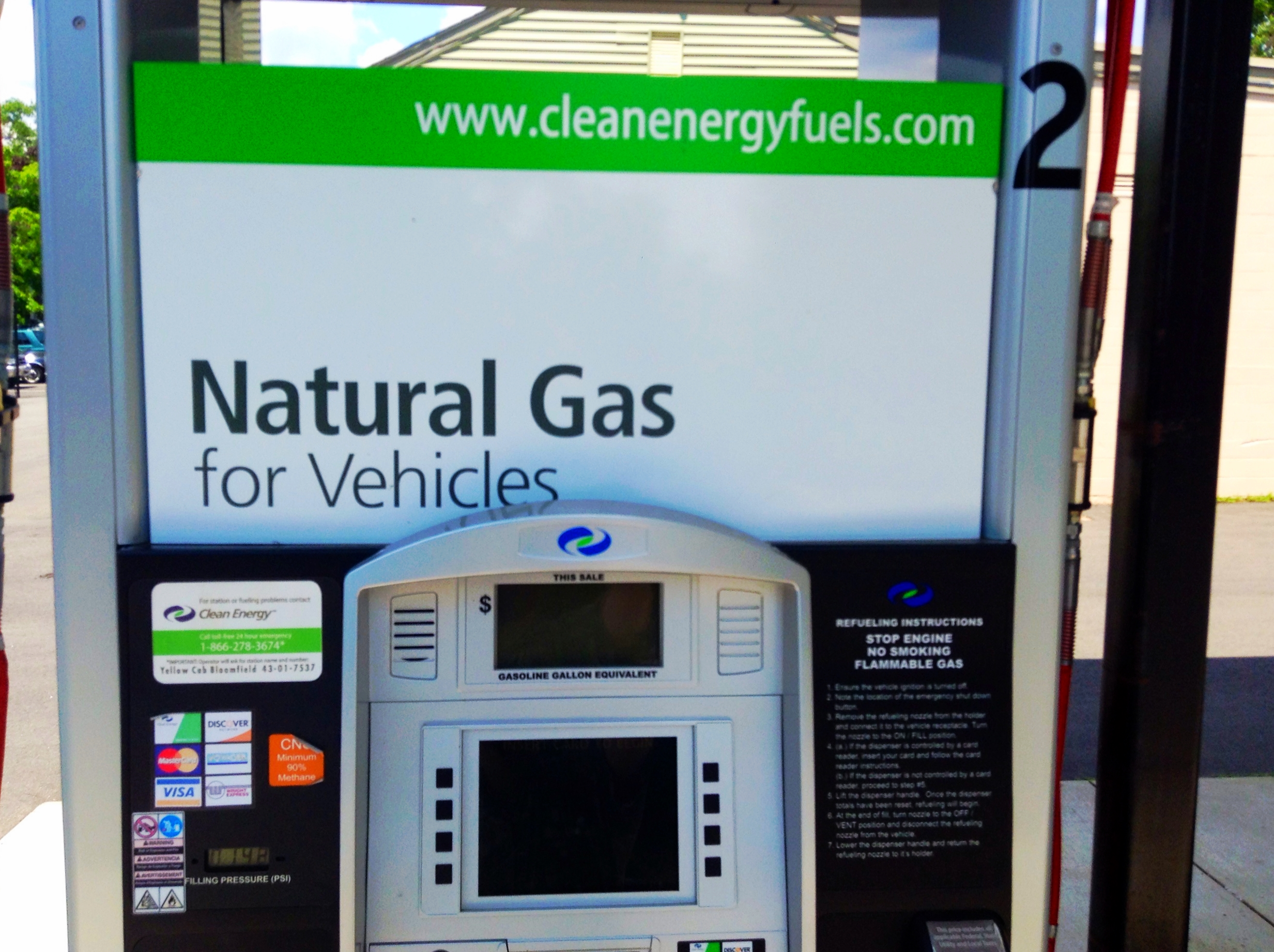
Renewable transportation fuel composed of organic waste. Alternative fuel strategies drastically lowers carbon emissions and air pollution.

== Market size ==
The International Energy Agency estimated that the global market for selected clean energy technologies reached nearly US$1.2 trillion in 2025. Europe was the second-largest market after China, with annual growth averaging more than 20% between 2015 and 2025.

== Investment worldwide ==
Investments in clean technology have grown considerably since coming into the spotlight around 2000. According to the United Nations Environment Program, wind, solar, and biofuel companies received a record $148 billion in new funding in 2007, as rising oil prices and climate change policies encouraged investment in renewable energy. $50 billion of that funding went to wind power. Overall, investment in clean-energy and energy-efficiency industries rose 60 percent from 2006 to 2007.

According to an MIT Energy Initiative Working Paper published in July 2016, about half of over $25 billion in funding provided by venture capital to cleantech from 2006 to 2011 was never recovered. The report cited cleantech's dismal risk/return profiles and the inability of companies developing new materials, chemistries, or processes to achieve manufacturing scale as contributing factors to its flop.

During the last twenty years, regulatory schemes and international treaties have been the main factors that defined the investment environment of clean technologies. Investments in renewable sources as well as the technologies for energy efficiency are a determining factor in the investments made under the context of the Paris Agreement and the fight against climate change and air pollution. Among the financing sources of the public sector, the government has used financial incentives and regulations targeting the private sector. This collective approach has contributed to the growth of clean energy capacity. The investments in renewable electricity generation technologies in 2015 were over US$308 billion and in 2019 this figure rose to US$311 billion.

Startups with new technology-based innovation are considered to be an attractive investment in a clean technology sector. Venture capital and crowdfunding platforms are crucial sources for developing ventures that lead to the introduction of new technologies. In the last decade, startups have contributed significantly to the increase in installed capacity for solar and wind power.. These trendsetting firms design new technologies and devise strategies for the industry to excel and become more resilient in the face of threats.

Annual cleantech investment in North America, Europe, Israel, China, India
Year	Investment ($mil)
2001	506.8
2002	883.2
2003	1,258.6
2004	1,398.3
2005	2,077.5
2006	4,520.2
2007	6,087.2
2008*	8,414.3
*2008 data preliminary
Source: Cleantech Group

In 2008, clean technology venture investments in North America, Europe, China, and India totaled a record $8.4 billion. Cleantech Venture Capital firms include NTEC, Cleantech Ventures, and Foundation Capital.The preliminary 2008 total represents the seventh consecutive year of growth in venture investing, which is widely recognized as a leading indicator of overall investment patterns. Investment in clean technology has grown significantly, with a considerable impact on production costs and productivity, especially, within energy intensive industries. The World Bank notes that these investments are enhancing economic efficiency, supporting sustainable development objectives, and promoting energy security by decreasing dependence on fossil fuel. China is seen as a major growth market for cleantech investments currently, with a focus on renewable energy technologies.

In 2014, Israel, Finland and the US were leading the Global Cleantech Innovation Index, out of 40 countries assessed, while Russia and Greece were last. Renewable energy investment has achieved substantial scale with annual investments around $300 billion. This volume of investment is fundamental to the global energy transition and remains in spite of an R&D funding plateau, representing the sector's healthy expansion and appreciation of renewable technology's promise. Several journals offer in-depth analyses and forecasts of this investment trend, stressing its significant role in the attainment of the world energy and climate targets. With regards to private investments, the investment group Element 8 has received the 2014 CleanTech Achievement award from the CleanTech Alliance, a trade association focused on clean tech in the State of Washington, for its contribution in Washington State's cleantech industry. Strategic investments in clean technologies within supply chains are increasingly influenced by sustainable market forces. These investments are vital for manufacturers, enhancing not only the sustainability of production processes, but, also encouraging a comprehensive transition towards sustainability across the entire supply chain. Detailed case studies and industry analyses highlight the economic and environmental benefits of such strategic investments. According to the published research, the top clean technology sectors in 2008 were solar, biofuels, transportation, and wind. Solar accounted for almost 40% of total clean technology investment dollars in 2008, followed by biofuels at 11%. In 2019, sovereign wealth funds directly invested just under US$3 billion in renewable energy .

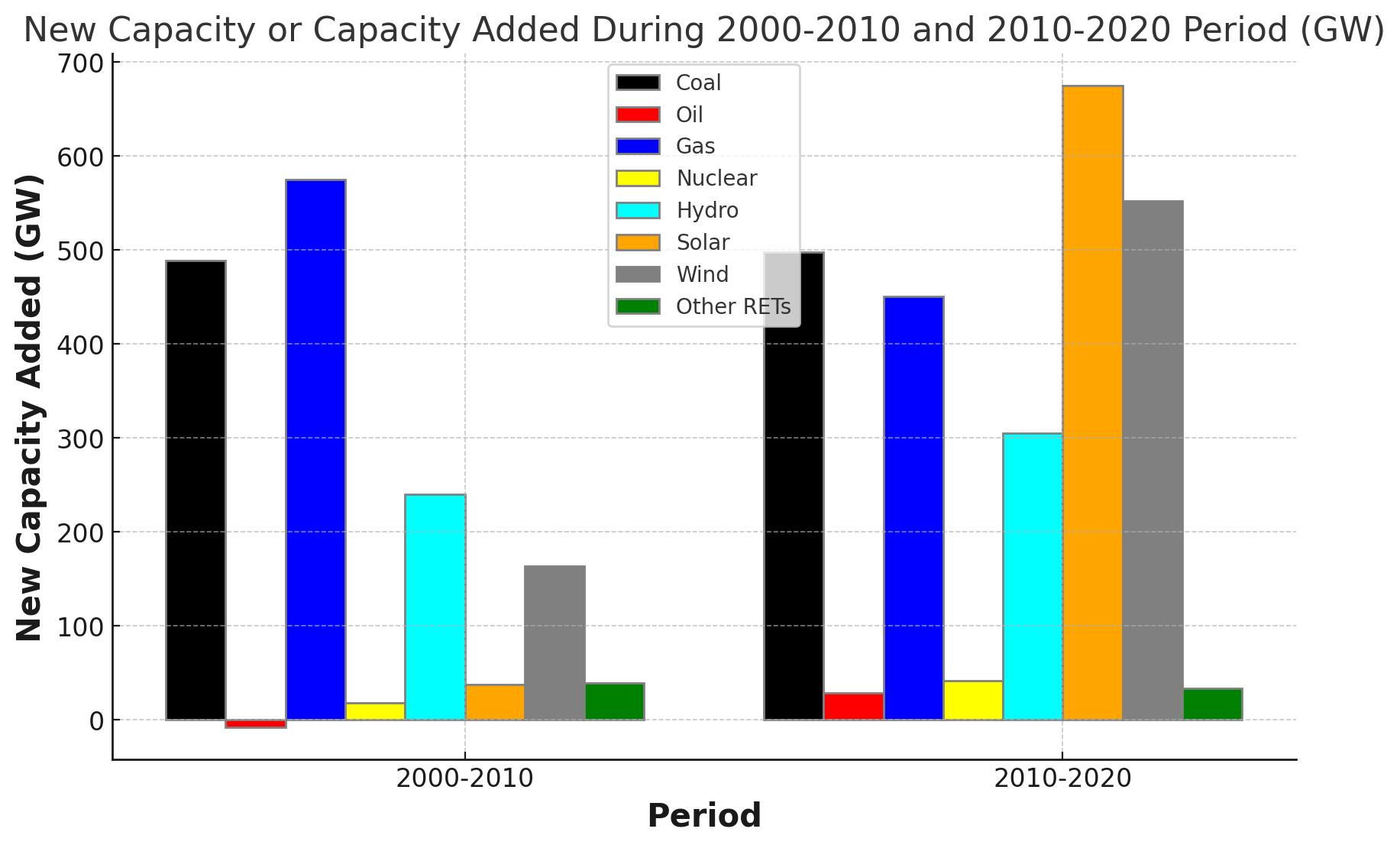
Comparative Growth in Energy Capacity by Source from 2000 to 2020: A Surge in Renewable Energy Investments

The 2009 United Nations Climate Change Conference in Copenhagen, Denmark was expected to create a framework whereby limits would eventually be placed on greenhouse gas emissions. Many proponents of the cleantech industry hoped for an agreement to be established there to replace the Kyoto Protocol. As this treaty was expected, scholars had suggested a profound and inevitable shift from "business as usual." However, the participating States failed to provide a global framework for clean technologies. The outburst of the 2008 economic crisis then hampered private investments in clean technologies, which were back at their 2007 level only in 2014. The 2015 United Nations Climate Change Conference in Paris is expected to achieve a universal agreement on climate, which would foster clean technologies development. On 23 September 2019, the Secretary-General of the United Nations hosted a Climate Action Summit in New York.

Between 2017 and 2021, European countries accounted for over 27% of international patent families (IPFs) in clean technology globally. This places Europe ahead of other major innovators, such as Japan (21%), the United States (20%), and China (15%).

In 2022 the investment in cleantech (also called climatetech) boomed. "In fact, climate tech investment in the 12 months to Q3 2022 represented more than a quarter of every venture dollar invested, a greater proportion than 12 of the prior 16 quarters."

US leads in carbon capture technologies, with nearly 30% of patents. It also leads in plastic recycling and climate change adaptation technologies, but has a lower share in low-carbon energy (13%). Japan excels in hydrogen-related (29.3%) and low-carbon energy technologies (26.2%). Chinese applicants dominate the field of ICT-related clean technologies, accounting for more than 37% of patents between 2017 and 2021. Meanwhile, South Korean applicants make notable contributions in ICT with 12.6%, in hydrogen technologies with 13%, and in low-carbon energy with 15.5%.

About half of the EU's clean technologies are in the launch or early revenue stage, 22% are in the scale-up stage, and 10% are mature or consolidating.

In China’s private-equity and venture-capital climate-tech sector, there were approximately 1,574 investment events between 2019 and the first half of 2022, involving over RMB 350 billion in total committed funding.¹ This sharp growth aligns with the wider surge in global cleantech investment in 2022.”

The European Commission estimates that an additional €477 million in annual investment is needed for the European Union to meet its Fit-for-55 decarbonization goals.

The European Green Deal has fostered policies that contributed to a 30% rise in venture capital for greentech companies in the EU from 2021 to 2023, despite a downturn in other sectors during the same period.

Key areas, such as energy storage, circular economy initiatives, and agricultural technology, have benefited from increased investments, supported by the EU's ambitious goal to reduce greenhouse gas emissions by at least 55% by 2030.

== Cleantech innovation hubs ==
=== Israel ===
Israel has 600 companies in the Cleantech sector. The Tel Aviv region was ranked second in the world by StartUp Genome for Cleantech ecosystems. Israel due to its geopolitical situation and harsh climate was forced to adopt technologies considered today as part of the cleantech sector. Following the scarcity of oil after the 1973 embargo on Israel, Israel switched to renewable energy in the 1970s and in 1976 all resedential buildings built from that year onward were forced to have such heating. As of 2020, 85% of water heating in Israel is done through renewable energy. Water scarcity led Israelis developed the modern drip irrigations system. Netafim, created in 1965 was the company that developed the technology and is now valued at about $1.85 billion. Israel also operates Israel Cleantech Ventures which funds cleantech startups. In Jerusalem there is a yearly Cleantech conference. UBQ, an Israeli startup which converts waste into friendly plastic secured $70 million in funding in 2023.

=== Netherlands ===
Amsterdam has emerged as one of Europe's leading circular economy hubs as the city aims to become fully circular by 2050 Its Circular Strategy 2020–2025 promotes collaboration between public authorities, businesses and research institutions, prioritizing circular construction, sustainable consumption and waste recovery. Amsterdam has also developed a circular start-up ecosystem which operates through accelerator programs, investment networks and academic institutions, which have facilitated more than €80 million in investment for circular technological companies.

=== Silicon Valley ===
Silicon Valley is the world's leading cleantech ecosystem according to StartUp Gencome's ranking. In 2020, investments in cleantech reached $17 billion.

=== Sweden ===
According to the Climate Tech Ecosystems Report 2025, Sweden is one of Europe's leading climate-tech hub with more than 490 startups. Between 2020 and 2024, Sweden attracted approximately €6.7 billion in venture capital. The Swedish hub's main strengths lie in clean energy, sustainable transportation and fashion.

== Implementation worldwide ==
=== China and Latin America ===
Investment in green technology and renewable energy in China is rapidly increasing. And Latin America has the world's highest electricity energy level, with 60% of its electricity coming from renewable sources. The region is rich in the minerals needed to make green technologies. Latin America needs Chinese technology to turn its abundant resources into electricity. Last year, about 99% of solar panels imported into Latin America were made in China. Also, about 70% of electric vehicles imported into Latin America last year were made in China. More than 90% of imported lithium-ion batteries imported into Latin America were also made in China. Latin America is increasingly relying on Chinese green technology, from electric buses to solar panels.

=== India ===
is one of the countries that have achieved remarkable success in sustainable development by implementing clean technology, and it became a global clean energy powerhouse. India, who was the third-largest emitter of greenhouse gases, advanced a scheme of converting to renewable energy with sun and wind from fossil fuels. This continuous effort has created an increase in the country's renewable energy capacity (around 80 gigawatts of installed renewable energy capacity, 2019), with a compound annual growth rate of over 20%. India's ambitious renewable energy targets have become the model for a swift clean energy shift. The government aimed to reach a 175 GW capacity of renewable energy up to 2022. Thus, included a big contribution from wind (60 GW) and solar energy (100 GW). By steadily increasing India's renewable capacity, India is achieving the Paris Agreement with a significant reduction in producing carbon emissions. Adopting renewable energy not only brought technological advances to India, but it also impacted employment by creating around 330,000 new jobs by 2022 and more than 24 million new jobs by 2030, according to the International Labour Organization in the renewable energy sector.

In spite of the global successes, the introduction of renewable energy is confronted with hurdles specific to the country or the region. These challenges encompass social, economic, technological, and regulatory. Research shows that social and regulatory barriers are direct factors affecting the deployment of renewable energy, economic barriers however have a more indirect, yet substantial effect. The study emphasises the need for removing these obstacles for renewable energy to become more available and attractive thus benefiting all parties such as local communities and producers.

Despite the prevalence of obstacles, emerging economy countries have formulated creative approaches to deal with the challenges. For example, India, has shown significant progress in the sector of renewable energy, a trend showing the adoption of clean technologies from other countries. The special approaches and problems that every country experiences in the course of the sustainable growth promote useful ideas for further development.

The creation of clean technologies such as battery storage, CCS, and advanced biofuels is important for the achievement of sustainable energy systems. Uninterrupted research and development is critical in improving the productivity of renewable energy sources and in making them more attractive for investment. These developments are a part of the wider goals related to sustainability and addressing climate change.

A further factor that determine the success of clean technology is how it is perceived by public and its social impact. Community involvement and observable benefits of these technologies can influence their adoption and popularity. The idea of shared benefits is created by making the renewable energy solutions environmentally friendly, cost-effective, and beneficial to producers.

=== Germany ===
has been one of the renewable energy leaders in the world, and their efforts have expedited the progress after the nuclear power plant meltdown in Japan in 2011, by deciding to switch off all 17 reactors by 2022. Still, this is just one of Germany's ultimate goals; and Germany is aiming to set the usage of renewable energy at 80% by 2050, which is currently 47% (2020). Energiewende in Germany is a model of a devoted effort to renewable energy aimed at decreasing the greenhouse gas (GHG) emissions by 80% by 2050 through the rushed adoption of renewable resources. This policy, aimed at addressing the environmental issues and the nationwide agreement on nuclear power abolition, illustrates the essential role of government policy and investment in directing technological adoption and providing a pathway towards the usage of sustainable energy. Obstacles to making the Energiewende a model for the transportation and heating sectors include the integration of renewable energies into existing infrastructure, the economic costs associated with transitioning technologies, and the need for widespread consumer adoption of new energy solutions. Also, Germany is investing in renewable energy from offshore wind and anticipating its investment to result in one-third of total wind energy in Germany. The importance of clean technology also impacted the transportation sector of Germany, which produces 17 percent of its emission. The famous car-producing companies, Mercedes-Benz, BMW, Volkswagen, and Audi, in Germany, are also providing new electric cars to meet Germany's energy transition movement.

=== Africa and the Middle East ===
has drawn worldwide attention for its potential share and new market of solar electricity. Notably, the countries in the Middle East have been utilizing their natural resources, an abundant amount of oil and gas, to develop solar electricity. Also, to practice the renewable energy, the energy ministers from 14 Arab countries signed a Memorandum of Understanding for an Arab Common Market for electricity by committing to the development of the electricity supply system with renewable energy. Sustainability when combined with clean technology focuses on the central environmental issues of learning how to fulfill the need of Earth's resources and the requirement for fast industrialization and consuming of the energy. The role of the technological innovations in the development of sustainable development across different fields, such as energy, agriculture, and infrastructure is paramount. The sustainability initiatives utilize contemporary science as well as green technologies of renewable energy sources and efficient energy conversion systems to minimize the environmental effects and promote economic and social welfare. This approach is consistent with sustainable development objectives since it offers measures that do not deplete natural resources but, instead, supply low-emission forms of energy.

== List of Clean Tech hubs ==
The following is a 2021 ranking of clean technology ecosystems.

Rank	Hub
1	(United States) Silicon Valley
2	(Israel) Tel Aviv
3	(Sweden) Stockholm
4	(United Kingdom) London
5	(United States) Los Angeles
6	(United States) Boston
7	(Netherlands) Amsterdam-Delta
8	(United States) New York City
9	(China) Beijing
10	(United States) Washington D.C
11	(Germany) Berlin
12	(Canada) Toronto-Waterloo
13	(United States) Denver-Boulder
14	(Sweden) Gothenburg
15	(France) Paris
16	(Canada) Vancouver
17	(Republic of Ireland) Dublin
18	(Switzerland) Bern-Geneva
19	(United States) Seattle
20	(Finland) Helsinki
21	(United States) San Diego
22	(Australia) Sydney
23	(United States) Houston
24	(Spain) Barcelona
25	(India) Delhi
26–30	(Canada) Calgary
26–30	(Germany) Frankfurt
26–30	(Spain) Madrid
26–30	(China) Shenzhen
26–30	Singapore

== United Nations: Sustainable Development Goals ==
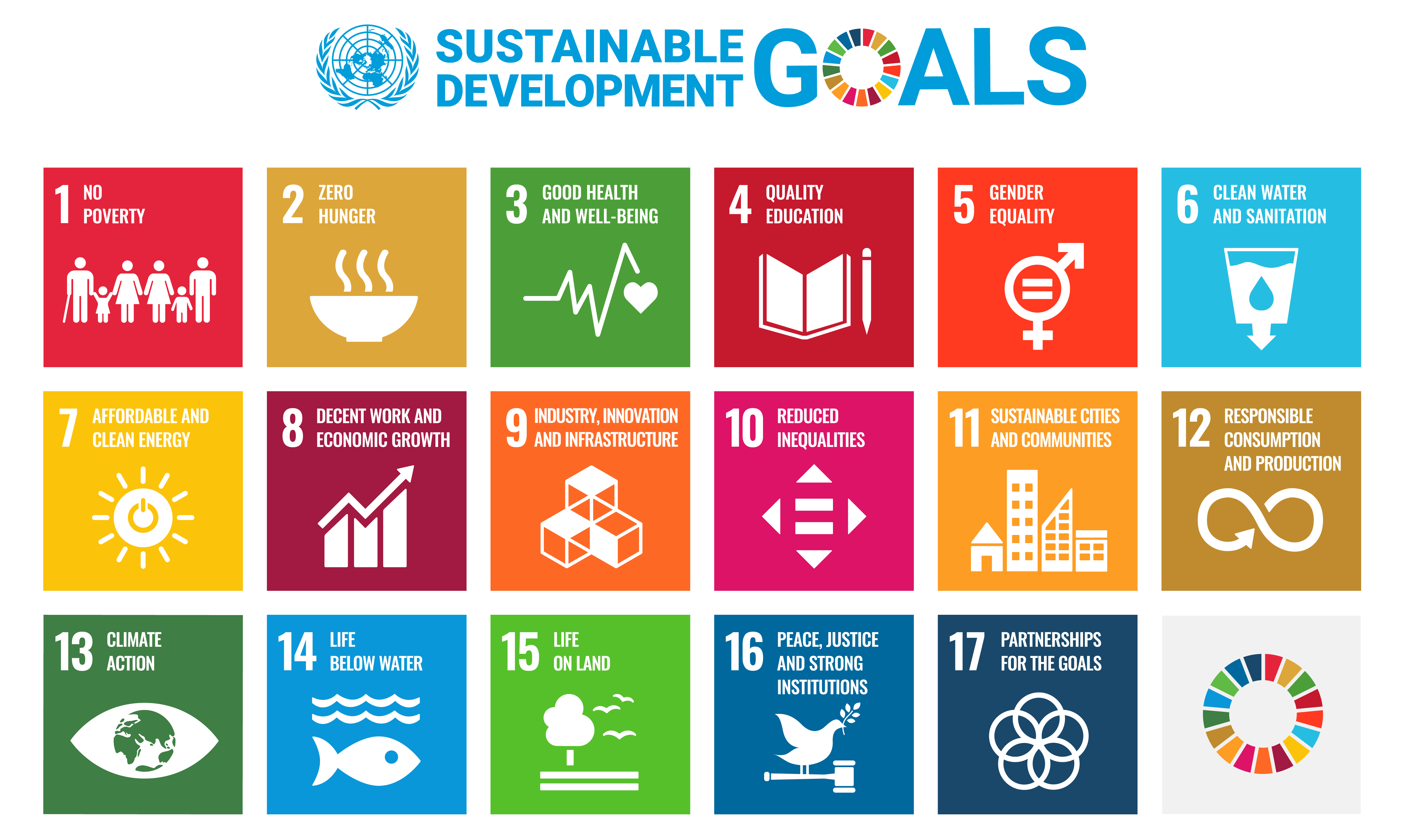
United Nations: 17 Sustainable Development Goals

The United Nations has set goals for the 2030 Agenda for Sustainable Development, which is called "Sustainable Development Goals" composed of 17 goals and 232 indicators total. These goals are designed to build a sustainable future and to implement in the countries (member states) in the UN. Many parts of the 17 goals are related to the usage of clean technology since it is eventually an essential part of designing a sustainable future in various areas such as land, cities, industries, climate, etc.

- Goal 6: "Ensure availability and sustainable management of water and sanitation for all"
  - Various kinds of clean water technology are used to fulfill this goal, such as filters, technology for desalination, filtered water fountains for communities, etc.
- Goal 7: "Ensure access to affordable, reliable, sustainable and modern energy for all"
  - Promoting countries for implementing renewable energy is making remarkable progress, such as:
    - "From 2012 to 2014, three quarters of the world's 20 largest energy-consuming countries had reduced their energy intensity — the ratio of energy used per unit of GDP. The reduction was driven mainly by greater efficiencies in the industry and transport sectors. However, that progress is still not sufficient to meet the target of doubling the global rate of improvement in energy efficiency."
- Goal 11: "Make cities and human settlements inclusive, safe, resilient and sustainable"
  - By designing sustainable cities and communities, clean technology takes parts in the architectural aspect, transportation, and city environment. For example:
    - Global Fuel Economy Initiative (GFEI) - Relaunched to accelerate progress on decarbonizing road transport. Its main goal for passenger vehicles, in line with SDG 7.3, is to double the energy efficiency of new vehicles by 2030. This will also help mitigate climate change by reducing harmful CO_{2} emissions.
- Goal 13: "Take urgent action to combat climate change and its impacts*"
  - Greenhouse gas emissions have significantly impacted the climate, and this results in a rapid solution for consistently increasing emission levels. United Nations held the "Paris Agreement" for dealing with greenhouse gas emissions mainly within countries and for finding solutions and setting goals.

== See also ==
- Environmental science
- Greentech (disambiguation)
- Sustainable engineering
- WIPO GREEN
