= List of technopolis in Turkey =

This is a list of technopolis in Turkey. As of 2014 there were 45 technopolis in Turkey. 32 of them, shown as green in list, are currently in service. 13 of them, shown as red in list, are currently under construction.

== History ==
Technology parks was revived by State Planning Organization in 1989.

Name	University	City	Founded	Website	Notes
Ankara University Technopolis	Ankara University	Ankara	2006	Official website	Official name: Ankara University Technology Development Zone
Antalya Teknopolis	Akdeniz University	Antalya	2004	Official website	Official name: West Mediterranean Technology Development Zone
ASO Technopolis	TOBB Economy and Technology University	Ankara	2008	Official website	Official name: ASO Technopolis Technology Development Zone
Bilkent Cyberpark	Bilkent University	Ankara	November 12, 2002	Official website	First technopolis among private universities in Turkey. Official name: Ankara Technology Development Zone
Boğaziçi University Technopolis	Boğaziçi University	Istanbul	2009	Official website	Official name: Boğaziçi University Technology Development Zone
Bolu Technopolis	Abant Izzet Baysal University	Bolu	2009	Official website	Official name: Bolu Technology Development Zone
Cumhuriyet Technopolis	Cumhuriyet University	Sivas	September 7, 2007	Official website	Official name: Cumhuriyet Technology Development Zone
Çanakkale Technopolis	Çanakkale Onsekiz Mart University	Çanakkale	2011		Official name: Çanakkale Technology Development Zone
Çukurova Technopolis	Çukurova University	Adana	July 17, 2004	Official website	Official name: Çukurova Technology Development Zone
Çorum Technopolis	Hitit University	Çorum	2012		Official name: Çorum Technology Development Zone
Dicle University Technopolis	Dicle University	Diyarbakır	October 10, 2007	Official website	Official name: Dicle University Technology Development Zone
Düzce Technopolis	Düzce University	Düzce	2010	Official website	Official name: Düzce Technopolis Technology Development Zone
Ege Technopark	Ege University	İzmir	2014	Official website	Official name: Ege Technopark Technology Development Zone (ideEGE-TGB)
Erciyes University Technopolis	Erciyes University	Kayseri	2004	Official website	Official name: Erciyes University Technology Development Zone
Erzurum Ata Technopolis	Atatürk University	Erzurum	March 5, 2005	Official website	Official name: Erzurum Ata Technopolis Technology Development Zone
ATAP Technopolis (Anadolu Technology Research Park)	Anadolu University, Eskişehir Osmangazi University, Eskisehir Eskisehir Technical University, Bilecik Bilecik Seyh Edebali University	Eskişehir	2003	Official website	Official name: Eskişehir Technology Development Zone
Fırat Technopolis	Fırat University	Elazığ	2007	Official website	Official name: Fırat Technology Development Zone
Gazi Technopolis	Gazi University	Ankara	2007	Official website	Official name: Gazi Technopolis Technology Development Zone
Technopark Ankara	Ankara Yıldırım Beyazıt University	Ankara	9 September 2014	Official website	Official name: Technopark Ankara Technology Development Zone
Gaziantep University Technopolis	Gaziantep University	Gaziantep	2006	Official website	Official name: Gaziantep University Technology Development Zone
GOSB Technopolis	Sabancı University	Kocaeli	2002	Official website	Official name: GOSB Technopark Technology Development Zone
Hacettepe University Technopolis	Hacettepe University	Ankara	March 20, 2003	Official website	Official name: Hacettepe University Technology Development Zone
Harran University Technopolis	Harran University	Şanlıurfa	2010	Official website	Official name: Harran University Technology Development Zone
Teknopark İstanbul	Neutral to all universities in Turkey with having İTİCÜ as the founding partner	Istanbul	2010	Official website	Official name: Teknopark Istanbul
Istanbul University Tecnopolis	Istanbul University	Istanbul	2003	Official website	Official name: Istanbul University Technology Development Zone
İTÜ Arı Technopolis	Istanbul Technical University	Istanbul	2003	Official website	It has 47 percent of patents, 57 percent of export and 45 percent of budget of R&D among the Turkish technopolis. Official name: İTÜ Arı Technopolis Technology Development Zone
İzmir Technopolis	İzmir Institute of Technology	İzmir	November 12, 2002	Official website	Official name: İzmir Technology Development Zone
Technocity İzmir	İzmir Kâtip Çelebi University	İzmir	2025	Official website	Official name: Technocity İzmir Technology Development Zone
Kahramanmaraş Technopolis	Sütçü İmam University	Kahramanmaraş	2011		Official name: Kahramanmaraş Technology Development Zone
Kocaeli University Technopolis	Kocaeli University	Kocaeli	2003	Official website	Official name: Kocaeli University Technology Development Zone
Kütahya Dumlupınar Design Technopolis	Dumlupınar University	Kütahya	2009		Official name: Kütahya Dumlupınar Design Technology Development Zone
Lakes Region Technopolis	Süleyman Demirel University and others	Isparta	2005	Official website	Official name: Lakes Region Technology Development Zone
Malatya Technopolis	İnönü University	Malatya	2009	Official website	Official name: Malatya Technology Development Zone
Mersin University Technopolis	Mersin University	Mersin	June 2005	Official website	Official name: Mersin Technology Development Zone
Middle East Technical University Technopolis	Middle East Technical University	Ankara	2001	Official website	First technopolis among the universities in Turkey. Official name: METU Technopolis Technology Development Zone
Muallimköy Technopolis	Gebze Institute of Technology	Kocaeli	2011		Official name: Muallimköy Technology Development Zone
Namık Kemal University Technopolis	Namık Kemal University	Tekirdağ	2011		Official name: Namık Kemal University Technology Development Zone
Pamukkale University Technopolis	Pamukkale University	Denizli	2007	Official website	Official name: Pamukkale University Technology Development Zone
Sakarya University Technopolis	Sakarya University	Adapazarı	2008	Official website	Official name: Sakarya University Technology Development Zone
Samsun Technopolis	Ondokuz Mayıs University	Samsun	2009	Official website	Official name: Samsun Technology Development Zone
Selçuk University Technopolis	Selçuk University	Konya	2003	Official website	Official name: Selçuk University Technology Development Zone
Tokat Technopolis	Gaziosmanpaşa University	Tokat	2008		Official name: Tokat Technology Development Zone
Trabzon Technopolis	Karadeniz Technical University	Trabzon	2004	Official website	Official name: Trabzon Technology Development Zone
Trakya University Edirne Technopolis	Trakya University	Edirne	2008	Official website	Official name: Trakya University Edirne Technology Development Zone
TÜBİTAK Marmara Research Center Technopolis	TÜBİTAK-TTGV	Kocaeli	January 27, 2000	Official website	First technopolis in Turkey. Official name: TÜBİTAK Marmara Research Center Technopolis
Ulutek Technopolis	Uludağ University	Bursa	2005	Official website	Official name: Ulutek Technology Development Zone
Bursateknopark Technopolis	Bursa Technical University	Bursa	2020	Official website	Official name: Bursa Technical University Technology Development Zone
Yıldız Technical University Technopolis	Yıldız Technical University	Istanbul	March 22, 2003	Official website	Official name: Yıldız Technical University Technology Development Zone
Yüzüncü Yıl University Technopolis	Yüzüncü Yıl University	Van	2012		Official name: Yüzüncü Yıl University Technology Development Zone

More than one technopolis One technopolis
