= Dapaah =

Dapaah is a surname. Notable people with the surname include:

- Bernice Dapaah, Ghanaian businesswoman
- Cecilia Dapaah (born 1954), Ghanaian politician
- Esther Obeng Dapaah (born 1945), Ghanaian politician and lawyer
- Michael Dapaah (born 1991), British actor, rapper, and comedian

== See also ==
- Albert Kan-Dapaah (born 1953), Ghanaian accountant and politician
