= WIPO GREEN =

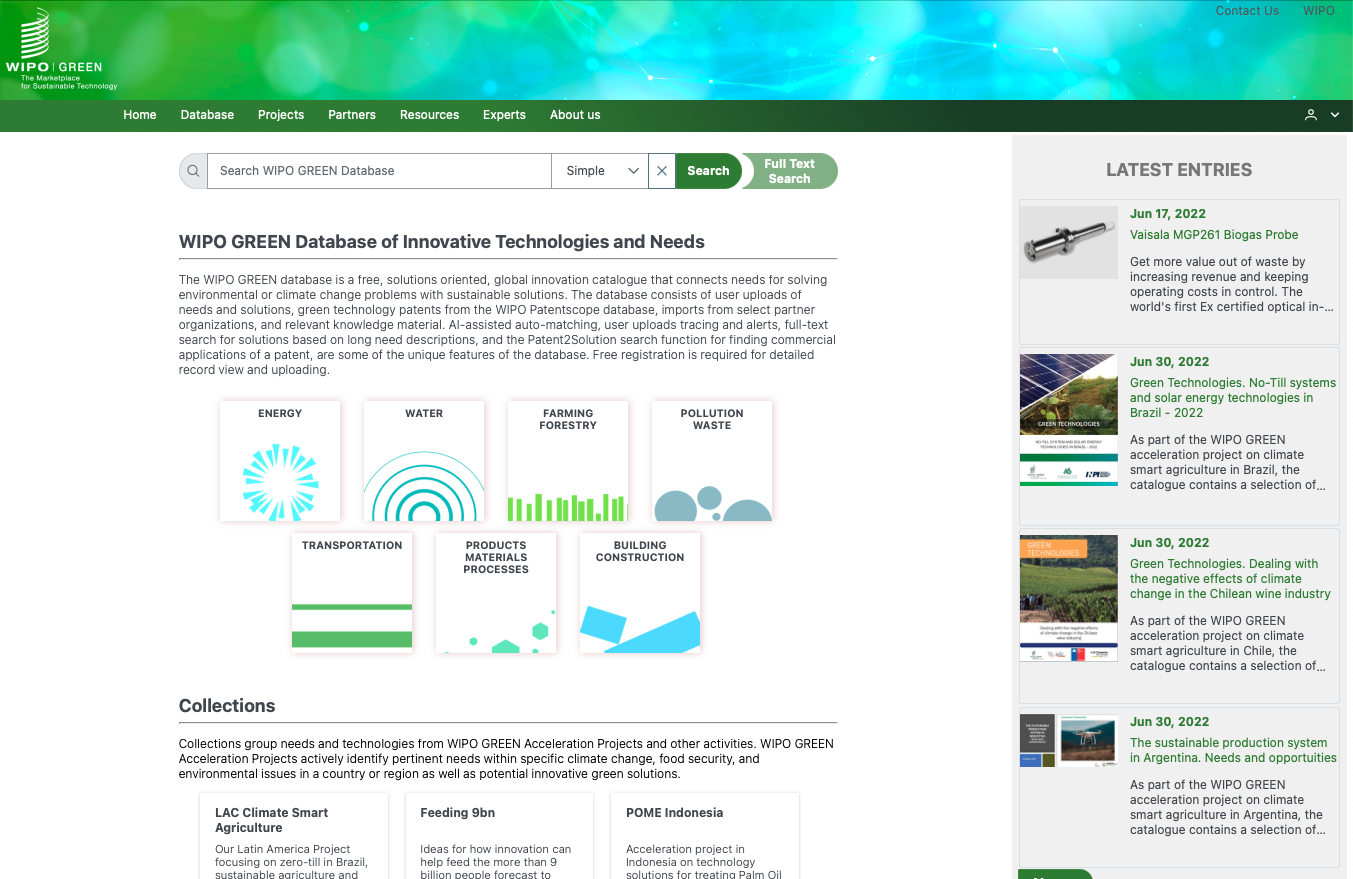
- Owner: World Intellectual Property Organization
- Industry: Sustainable technology
- Services: Free online database of green technologies and needs, acceleration projects, partners network
- Website: https://www3.wipo.int/wipogreen/en/

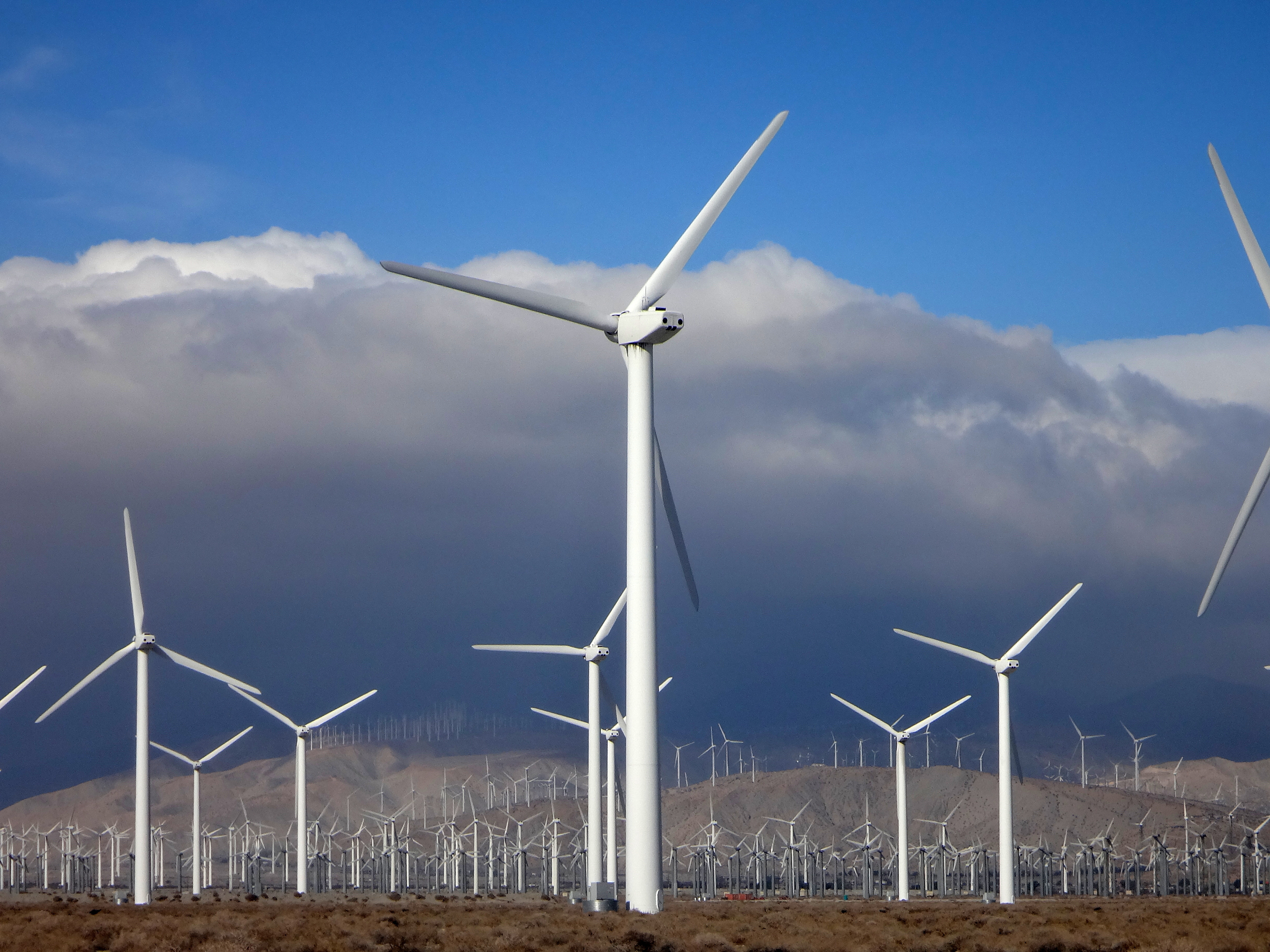
The San Gorgonio Pass wind farm in California, United States.

WIPO GREEN is a World Intellectual Property Organization program established in 2013 that supports global efforts to address climate change and food security through sharing of sustainable technology innovations.

== WIPO GREEN database ==
The WIPO GREEN database is the foundation of the platform. The database is a free, solutions-oriented, global innovation catalog that connects needs for solving environmental or climate change problems with sustainable solutions from prototypes to marketable products available for sale, license, collaborations, knowledge transfer, joint ventures, or collaborations. Green technology innovators can promote their products, businesses, organizations, and governments looking for green technologies can explain their needs and seek collaboration with providers.

As of July 2022, WIPO GREEN has over 120,000 technologies, needs and experts, more than 2000 users in 110 countries, and has recorded over 1000 connections made between technology providers and seekers.

The database utilizes AI-assisted auto-matching, user uploads tracing and alerts, full-text search for solutions based on long need descriptions, and the Patent2Solution search function for finding commercial applications of a patent, which are some of the unique features of the database. Free registration is required for detailed record view and uploading.

All technologies uploaded to the WIPO GREEN database remain the property of the rights holder. It is up to the rights holder and the collaborating parties to structure agreements in the manner they feel is most appropriate and effective.

WIPO GREEN does not require that technologies or innovations uploaded to the database be patented or in the process of being patented. Therefore, technology providers can upload their technology while related patent applications are pending. Technology providers are encouraged to upload technology solutions on the WIPO GREEN database and connect with other users to explore partnerships, technology transfers, including funding and licensing opportunities.

== Acceleration projects ==
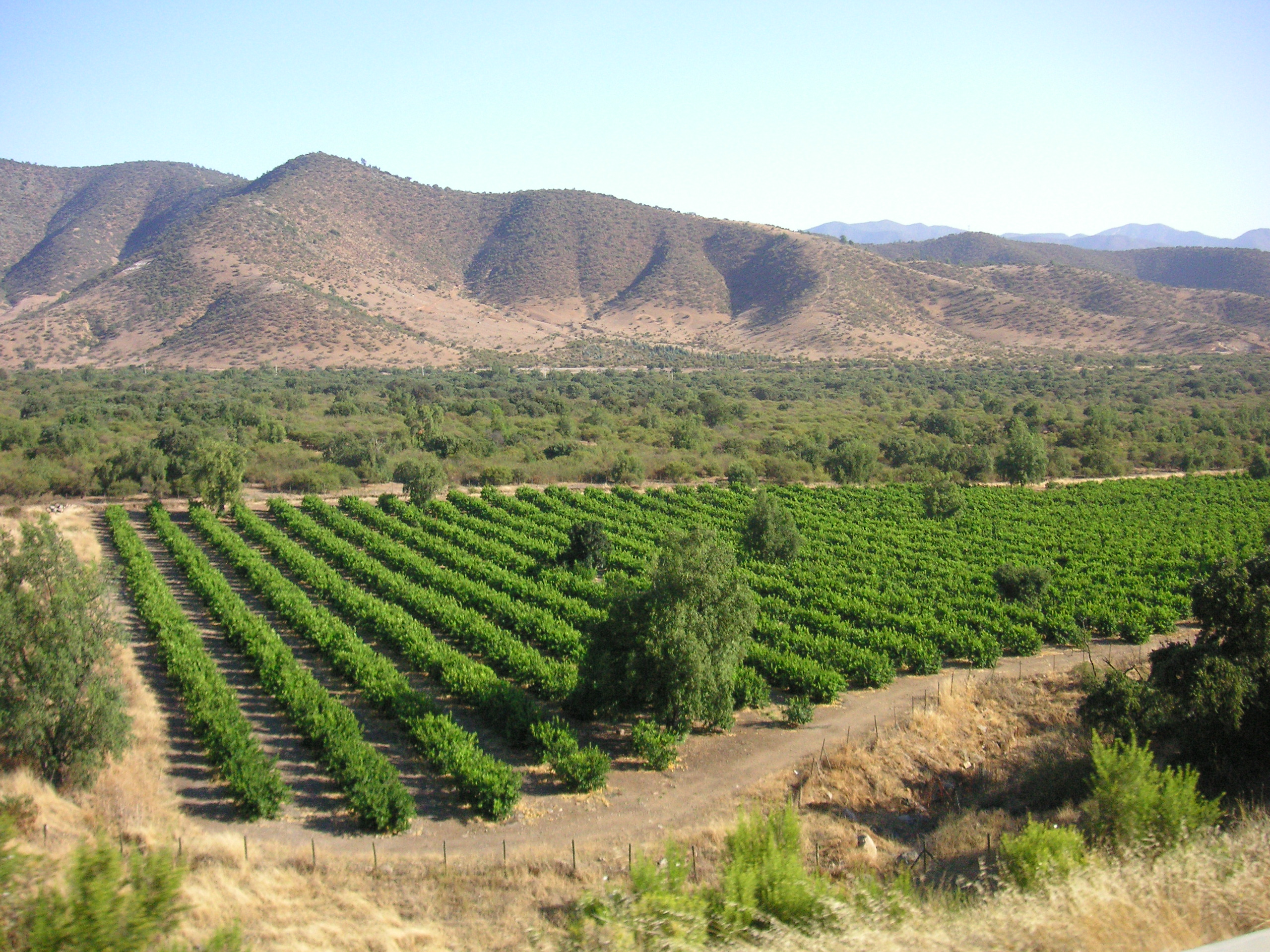
Chile's vineyards within the foothills of the Andes.

Acceleration projects work with WIPO GREEN partners and local organizations to explore local challenges and green opportunities for particular environmental needs. These projects are organized annually in different countries or regions around and connect providers and seekers of green technologies.

For example, the Latin America Acceleration Project explores innovative new technologies in the region and facilitates green technology exchange between providers and seekers in green opportunities in intensified crop rotation, soil re-carbonization, and forest management in Argentina; zero-till or conservation agriculture in Brazil; and wine production in Chile.

In October 2021, a project in Indonesia on palm oil mill effluent (POME), a by-product of palm oil production that emits greenhouse gases and reportedly harms flora and fauna in local rivers, identified viable green solutions to turn the high organic content of POME wastewater into biogas and other environmentally friendly uses.

Former projects took place in Cambodia, Indonesia, and the Philippines around wastewater treatment, agriculture, and water technologies.

== The Green Technology Book ==
In November 2022 at UNFCCC COP27, WIPO introduced its new Flagship publication the Green Technology Book. This digital-first publication aims to put innovation, technology and intellectual property at the forefront in the fight against climate change. The inaugural edition of this annual publication focused on available solutions for climate-change adaptation to reduce vulnerability as well as to increase resilience to the impacts of climate change. The book was created in cooperation with the Climate Technology Center and Network (CTCN) and the Egyptian Academy of Scientific Research and Technology (ASTR). It features 200 adaptation technologies, which are also available in the WIPO GREEN database of innovative technologies and needs.

== Partners Network ==
WIPO GREEN partners are public or private institutions that wish to collaborate to advance WIPO GREEN’s mission. The network is aimed at helping the implementation and diffusion of green technology innovations around the world. Partners include government institutions, intergovernmental organizations, academia, and businesses – from small and medium-sized enterprises to Fortune 500 companies.

As of 2022, WIPO GREEN has a network of over 146 partner organizations involved in green technology.

List of some of WIPO Green partners	Year join	Country
Asian Development Bank	2014	Philippines
Ajinomoto	2021	Japan
Hong Kong Trade Development Council / Asia IP Exchange (Hong Kong SAR, China)	2014	Hong Kong, China
Austria Wirtschaftsservice Gesellschaft mbH (aws)	2021	Austria
Canadian Intellectual Property Office	2017	Canada
Canon	2020	Japan
CGIAR	2020	France
Climate KIC (Switzerland)	2015	Switzerland
Daicel	2020	Japan
Daikin	2020	Japan
Denka	2022	Japan
Furukawa Electric	2021	Japan
Ghana Bamboo Bikes Initiative	2013	Ghana
Haier (China)	2015	China
Hitachi	2020	Japan
Honda	2020	Japan
IBM	2019	Multinational
Inovent (Turkey)	2013	Turkey
International Chamber of Commerce	2014	France
Japan Patent Office	2020	Japan
K. A. CARE	2017	Saudi Arabia
Konica Minolta	2019	Japan
League of Arab States	2013	Egypt
Malawi University of Science and Technology	2020	Malawi
Meiji University Center for Polymer Science	2020	Japan
Mitsubishi Electric	2021	Japan
Moscow State Institute of International Relations (MGIMO University)	2019	Russia
Panasonic	2020	Japan
Ricoh	2021	Japan
Sabancı University (Turkey)	2013	Turkey
Saudi Authority for Intellectual Property	2020	Saudi Arabia
Shiseido	2020	Japan
Siemens (Germany)	2013	Germany
Skolkovo Foundation	2020	Russia
Solar Impulse Foundation	2019	Switzerland
Strathmore University, CIPIT (Kenya)	2013	Kenya
Sumitomo Electric Industries	2019	Japan
Swiss Federal Institute of Intellectual Property	2019	Switzerland
Technology Development Foundation of Turkey	2014	Turkey
Tianjin TEDA Company	2020	China
Teijin	2015	Japan
University of Tokyo	2021	Japan
Tohoku University	2021	Japan
Tokai National Higher Education and Research System	2020	Japan
Toyota Industries	2019	Japan
Toyota	2020	Japan
Waseda Environmental Institute, Waseda University	2014	Japan
Yamagata University	2021	Japan
