= Istanbul Technical University Arı Technopolis =

ITU ARI Teknokent is a science park located in Istanbul Technical University main Maslak campus. ITU ARI Teknokent, which is the center of effective cooperation between industry and university, carries on working for technology companies and entrepreneurs of different scales getting prepared to change the future. A Technology Development Zone that produces, develops and supports projects, platforms and programs for technological development! Established as a reflection of the visionary perspective of Istanbul Technical University in 2002, ITU ARI Teknokent derives its power from 250 years of rooted history of ITU.

ITU ARI Teknokent with currently more than 300 technology companies and more than 7,000 staff increases the competitiveness of Turkey in the field of technology on a global scale by producing more than 600 projects a year. It carries out new projects every year in addition to over 2,500 successful R&D projects accomplished so far.

In ITU ARI Teknokent where building a performance-based system and providing assessment and evaluation are inseparable from development itself a “Start-up Performance Evaluation System” has been established with categories including “National Contribution”, “R&D Turnover” and “R&D Export” to improve the success bar of the companies in the region.

In line with the performance objectives that will be refined and redefined every year, ITU ARI Teknokent expects companies under its roof to quadruple their R&D income through engineering new technologies by 2023.

== Ecosystem ==
ITU Çekirdek Early Stage Incubation Center established by ITU ARI Teknokent based on the vision of ‘technology-based development’ and awarded the third place in the world today and having a 74 million TL investment, offers everything that a technology entrepreneur needs. The doors of ITU Çekirdek are open to all entrepreneurs who have technological and innovative business ideas and who believe that the initiative is innovative and commercialized.

ITU Magnet established to provide a solution to a major need of the entrepreneurial ecosystem focuses on the problems of the advanced stage entrepreneurs and offers more than a physical co-working area with laboratory facilities, comfortable working area and synergy-filled activities. With their achievements in just one year, ITU Magnet companies prove that they can produce great value if they are supported by the advanced stage entrepreneurs.

Initiated by ITU ARI Teknokent with the support of Istanbul Development Agency to increase technology export and to prepare the technology companies that grow out of these lands to global markets, Innogate International Acceleration Program offers a combination of access to global network, business model and strategy development opportunities. The program, which has become an international success story, hosts companies in the global market with its offices in San Francisco, New York and Chicago.

== See also ==
- Istanbul Technical University
- List of technopolis in Turkey
- Science park
- List of research parks
