= Winnifred Selby =

Ghanaian social entrepreneur

- Occupation: social entrepreneur
- Organization: EPF Educational Empowerment Initiative
- Awards: inducted into the Royal Institute of Singapore

Winnifred Kyei Selby is a young Ghanaian social entrepreneur and the president of the EPF Educational Empowerment Initiative based in Kumasi, Ashanti Region of Ghana. She co-founded the Ghana Bamboo Bike Initiative with Bernice Dapaah at the age of 15. At age 17, she established another business, the Afrocentric Bamboo Initiative. In 2018, she became the first Ghanaian to be inducted into the Royal Institute of Singapore.

== Education and career ==
Selby attended Joy Standard College. She is also an alumna of Cambridge University Leading For Change Executive Education and Fellow of the Royal Commonwealth Society. She co-founded the Ghana Bamboo Bike Initiative with Bernice Dapaah at the age of 15 and the Afrocentric Bamboo Initiative at the age of 17 right after completing her secondary education.

== Awards and achievements ==
- Anzisha Prize Fellow
- World Economic Forum Global shaper
- Board member of Dawadawa Impact Investment Fund.
- Board member of the SHE Scholarships Fund of the EPF Educational Empowerment Initiative.
- Finalist of the 2014 Cartier Women's Initiative Awards
- Honoured Airtel Touching Lives 2014 Award
- She was honoured 2015 World of Children Award in New York
- Winner of the 2016 New African Woman in Science, Technology & Innovation Award
- Winner of the 2017 Queen's Young Leader Award
- Featured in Forbes as one of the social entrepreneurs in Africa to watch
- First Ghanaian to be inducted into the Royal Institute of Singapore
- She has hosted a TED talk with TEDx Accra
- Invited by Former President of the United States, Barack Obama to be part of the 2015 Global Entrepreneurship Summit in Nairobi, Kenya

== Philanthropy and activism ==
=== EPL Educational Empowerment Initiative ===
To break down barriers to education and empower young people from deprived communities, Selby founded the EPF Educational Empowerment Initiative.

=== Winnifred's Menstrual Pads for Dignity ===
She also founded the Winnifred's Menstrual Pads for Dignity Project which provides free disposable menstrual products for needy girls in the most deprived districts in Ghana.

=== Happy Feed Initiative ===
Selby initiated the Happy Feed Initiative, which complements the government of Ghana free school feeding and free uniforms program. This initiative provides new shoes and other educational supplies such as bags, books, and calculators to needy school children in deprived communities.

=== Ghana Girls College ===
In partnership with private universities in Ghana, she also started the Ghana Girls College Scholarship program which offers scholarships to brilliant but needy high school girls.

=== W3 Initiative ===
She is the founder for Winnie Women's World. W3 Initiative is a non profit organization made of promotes gender equality, women empowerment and girl and children education.

== See also ==
- Bernice Dapaah
- Queen's Young Leader Award
