= Greentech =

Greentech could refer to:

- Cleantech
- Green technology, also called environmental technology
- GreenTech ITM, a U.S.-based company that creates modular turf systems
- GreenTech Automotive, a U.S.-based bankrupt "green" automobile manufacturer
