= World Bamboo Organization =

World Bamboo Organization Founded as the International Bamboo Association (IBA), the idea for an international coordinating body for bamboo practitioners was born out of discussions at the International Bamboo Workshop in Chiang Mai, Thailand in 1991. The IBA was consequently established at the 1992 International Bamboo Congress in Japan. Through 1998 the IBA had been the coordinating platform for bamboo people around the world, with its primary responsibility being the International Bamboo Congress & International Bamboo Workshop. A union of these two distinct gatherings is today called the World Bamboo Congress, and has led to the rebirth of the IBA into the World Bamboo Organization. The WBO was legally formed as a U.S. tax-exempt trade association in 2005 by CEO Susanne Lucas. She currently holds the position of Executive Director, WBO Ambassador and is the author of Bamboo. Kamesh Salam (Assam, India) served as President 2007-2009. Michel Abadie (Paris, France) served his first term as President from 2010-2012, and was reappointed a second term in 2013 and has continued his role to the present.

The founding members of the WBO are Susanne Lucas(USA), I.V. Ramanuja Rao (India), Karina Quintans (USA), David Flanagan (USA), Carmelita Bersalona (Philippines), Amin Samuel Zacca (Ghana), Jorge Campos (Chile), Victor Brias (Belgium).

An Honorary Council was established in 2005 to support WBO with professional consultation and expertise. The Honorary Council evolved and was renamed to better reflect the horizontal structure of its collaborations in the name of bamboo; who are now collectively called World Bamboo Ambassadors

== World Bamboo Congress ==
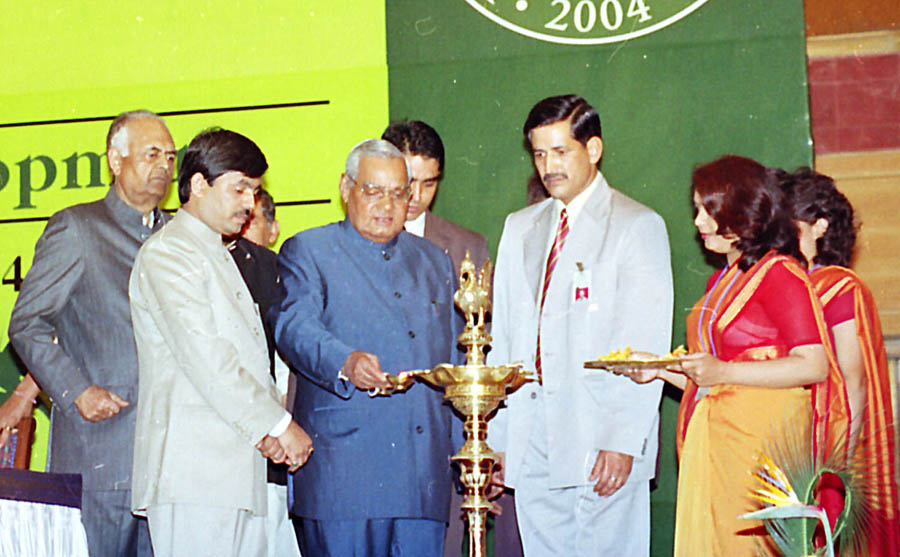
The Prime Minister Shri Atal Bihari Vajpayee inaugurating the VII World Bamboo Congress in New Delhi on February 27, 2004.

Every 3–4 years the WBO organizes a World Bamboo Congress (WBC).

In the last 20 years, the WBC as a series of Sessions & Demonstrations has attracted around 400 participants from more than 30 countries around the world, including world-renowned experts in bamboo design, construction, and architecture.

The aim of the WBC is to promote best practices in supply chain management for bamboo in order to protect natural resources and the environment, to ensure sustainable utilization, as well as promote traditional uses locally and for community economic development. Additionally, the WBC promotes new cultivation of bamboo for new industries such as bio-energy, bio-plastics, climate mitigation, housing materials, pulp, paper, textiles, nutrition and medicine.

The most recent WBC took place in Damyang, Korea in 2015 during the World Bamboo Fair, hosted by the municipality of Damyang, a location considered to be a significant bamboo habitat in Korea. The World Bamboo Fair attracted several hundred thousand visitors during the months of September and October, with its motto, “Bamboo for a Greener Future”, the fair encouraged the exchange of ideas and educated the public on bamboo's many uses.

== World Bamboo Day ==
World Bamboo Day was officially established on September 18 at the 8th World Bamboo Congress held in Bangkok in 2009 and declared by the Thai Royal Forest Department. People and businesses from around the world use this day to raise awareness of the benefits of bamboo and to promote its use in everyday products. On this day each year, its celebration has included bamboo planting ceremonies, 5K races, various contests and other kinds of celebrations around the world.

== United Nations Global Compact and the SDGs ==
In January 2016, World Bamboo Organization joined the United Nations Global Compact (UNGC), the world's largest sustainability initiative. WBO accepted Sustainable Development Goals (SDG's) upholding the aims of the UNGC.

== WBO Ambassadors ==
A group of people from many countries around the world have united to become World Bamboo Ambassadors. Among the ambassadors, Dr. Chongtham Nirmala is a professor of botany at Panjab University where she mainly focuses in nutritive value and phytochemicals research regarding bamboo shoots, as an ambassador she promotes bamboo use as wood and food. Ambassadors mainly find biological value to bamboo and some economically assist their surroundings with its use. Bernice Dapaah, the Executive Director of Ghana Bamboo Bikes Initiative, was appointed as a World Bamboo Ambassador as a result of her bringing jobs to rural areas of Africa in an effort to raise its economy as it is a major holder of bamboo. As WBO Ambassador, Susanne Lucas, also the CEO of WBO, advocates for bamboo by collaborating with organizations like International Centre for Bamboo and Rattan (ICBR) who researches bamboo genetics and engineering for sustainable use.
