= Bernice Dapaah =

Ghanaian entrepreneur

- Education: Christian Service University College (BBA); KNUST (MA)
- Alma mater: Harvard University (Exec. Ed.); University of Oxford (Exec. Fellowship)
- Occupations: Social entrepreneur, CEO
- Known for: Founder of Ghana Bamboo Bikes Initiative
- Title: CEO, Envirotech Bamboo Limited; CEO, Ghana Bamboo Bike Initiative
- Awards: Entrepreneur for the World Award (2015); UNEP/Dubai International Award (2014); MIPAD Honor

Bernice Dapaah is a Ghanaian social entrepreneur who is the founder and chief executive officer of the Ghana Bamboo Bike Initiative in Kumasi. This Initiative addresses environmental degradation through the production of bicycles using environmentally friendly resources such as bamboo. She and her company, Ghana Bamboo Bike Initiative have won several awards. In 2016 and 2017 she was listed as one of WomanRising's 100 Most Outstanding Women Entrepreneurs in Ghana. Dapaah sits on the advisory board of the WIPO GREEN in Switzerland and is the founding curator of the Kumasi Hub of the Global Shapers. In addition, she is a member of the World Economic Forum Global Agenda Council on Biodiversity and Natural Capital.

== Education ==
Dapaah graduated from the Christian Service University with a bachelor's degree in business administration. She also holds a diploma in Human Resource Management and Marketing from the Institute of Commercial Management in UK. She holds a diploma in “Executive education” from Harvard University. She currently holds a Master’s Degree in Development Management from Kwame Nkrumah University of Science and Technology.

== Career ==
Motivated by the high unemployment rate in Ghana, Dapaah decided to venture into Entrepreneurship just when she was about completing school. She and her friends wanted to create jobs rather than seek one. And hence she and Winnifred Selby founded the Ghana Bamboo Bike in 2009.

She is also an Ambassador for the World Bamboo Organization in Switzerland.

== Ghana Bamboo Bike Initiative ==
The Ghana Bamboo Bike Initiative aside providing employment for the youth, helps reduce environmental degradation through the use of local and environmentally friendly resources such as bamboo in the production of bicycles. This Initiative has won several awards including the 2014 UNEP/Dubai International Award, 2013 UNFCCC Momentum For Change Light House Activity Award (Women For Results Category), World Business and Development Award 2012, UN Habitat/Dubai International Best Practice Award 2012, Samsung/Generations For Peace Impact Award 2012, GIZ Impact Business Award 2011, and UNEP SEED Initiative Award 2010.

== Awards and recognition ==
- Vital Voices Lead Fellow
- 2014 Young Global Leader of the World Economic Forum
- She was awarded “Entrepreneur for the World Award” by the World Entrepreneurship Forum
- She was honored World Ambassador of the World Bamboo Organization.
- She won the 2013 International Women Alliance World of Difference Award.
- Advisory Board Member of WIPO GREEN
