= Technology Development Foundation of Turkey =

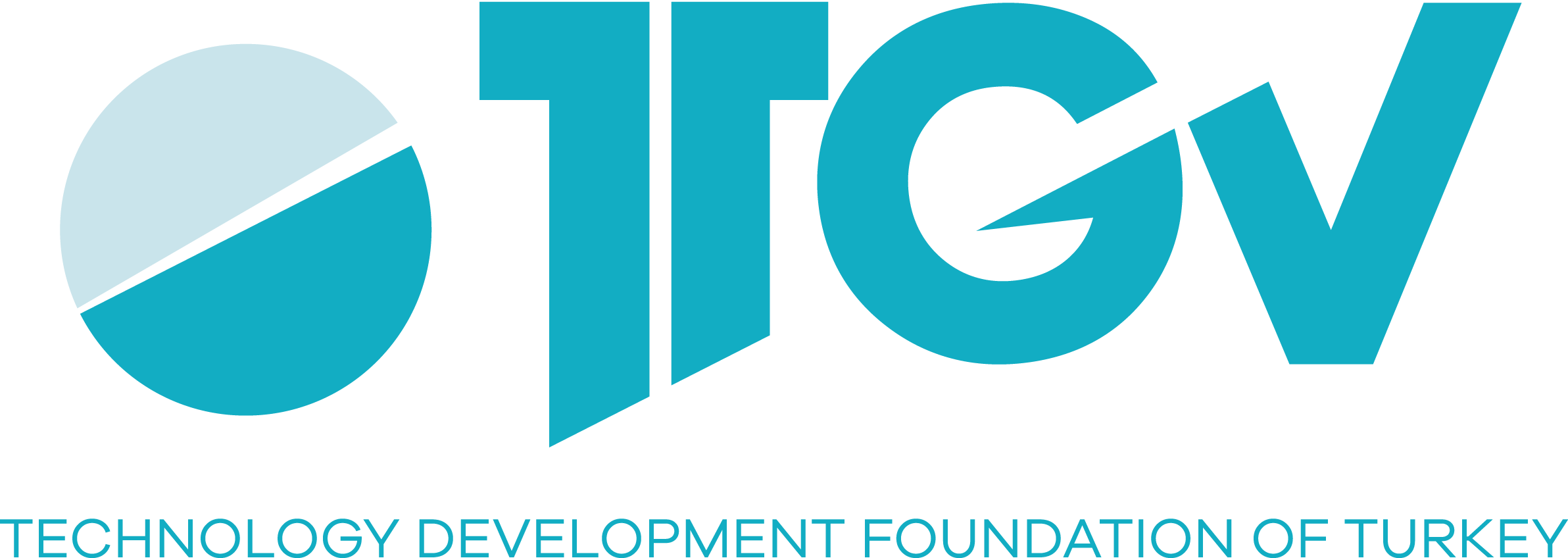

Agency overview
- Formed: 1 June 1991
- Headquarters: Ankara, Turkey
- Agency executives: Değerhan Usluel, Chairman of the Board; Dr. A. Mete Çakmakcı, Secretary General
- Website: www.ttgv.org.tr/en

The Technology Development Foundation of Turkey (TTGV) is the manager of Turkey's first public-private funded program to support research, development, and technological innovation projects in the private sector. TTGV is administrated by a private sector majority public-private board and is fully independent and transparent in daily operations. Since 1991, the Foundation has managed over US$0.5 billion in public funds through various programs. As a part of innovation ecosystem, TTGV serves to improve the capacity of private entrepreneurship by using public and its own funds in order to:

- Develop and manage funds and programs
- Contribute with consultancy, educational, coaching and analyzing services
- Generate collaboration platforms to raise awareness and agenda setting
- Policy making and corporate knowledge sharing between local and international networks.

By taking into account all of these factors, TTGV could be regarded as an autonomous and distinctive model of public-private partnership.

== History ==
TTGV is a non-profit public private partnership under the legal structure of a foundation headquartered in Ankara, Turkey. The foundation was established in 1991, with the collaboration of 24 private sectors, 5 public institutions, 11 umbrella organizations and 15 individuals.

There are 10 members from the independent private sector and 5 from the public sector. TTGV has been part of many firsts in Turkey, as it invested in the first two PE funds, financed the first techno-park development projects, invested in the first technology start-up investment company, and invested in the first dedicated fund of funds in Turkey. TTGV has 36 full-time professionals and an expert network that involves 1,500 professionals from various fields.

== Business line ==
Under four main categories of activities, TTGV addresses to reach out to its sponsors, partners and clients through products of strong brand recognition. These categories are the following:

- Program Management—TTGV manages soft loans and compulsory company contribution programs through its own and public funds. In general, the funds of TTGV concentrate on research and development, technological innovation, and environmental sustainability. Program Management is the main branch of foundation.
- Projects & Consultancy—TTGV takes an active role to determine the deficiencies and necessities of existing innovation ecosystem and to disseminate sample implications. In this regard, the foundation provides consultancy and coaching services for the private sector.
- Funds Management—Since 2000, TTGV has become one of the important foundations in the venture fund field in Turkey. The foundation has a broad experience with competence on financial management, reporting, and accountability through its corporate structure. Through its soft loan program, TTGV provided above US$385 million to around 1000 technology development projects.
- Intellectual Platforms—As a pioneer public-private partnership model, TTGV aims to establish an environment to generate, share and disseminate new, creative and innovative ideas. From this point of view, TTGV acts as an innovation think tank by laying a bridge between policy makers, academicians, civil society organizations, experts, and professionals from private sector.
