= Antony MacDonnell, 1st Baron MacDonnell =

British official in Ireland, India & Burma (1844–1925)

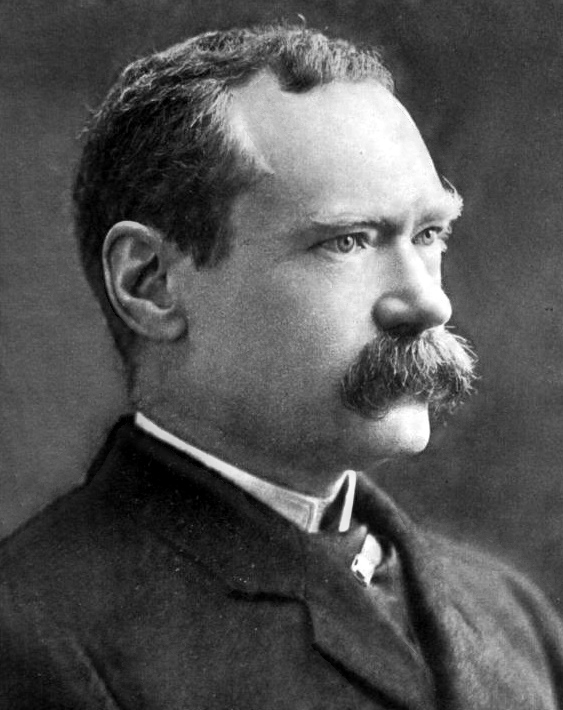
Lord MacDonnell

Antony Patrick MacDonnell, 1st Baron MacDonnell, GCSI, KCVO, PC (Ire) (7 March 1844 – 9 June 1925), known as Sir Antony MacDonnell between 1893 and 1908, was an Irish civil servant, much involved in the Indian land reform and famine relief in India. He was Permanent Under-Secretary to the Lord Lieutenant of Ireland (1902–1908); Member of the Council of India (1902); Privy Councillor (1902); Lieutenant-Governor of the United Provinces of Agra and Oudh (1895–1901); Lieutenant-Governor of Bengal (1893–1895); Chief Commissioner of the Central Provinces (1890–1893); Chief Commissioner of Burma (1889–1890); Home Secretary to the Central Government of India (1886–1889); Secretary to the Government of Bengal and the Bengal Legislative Council.

== Early life ==
MacDonnell was born at Palmfield House, Shragh Lower, Carracastle, Ballaghaderreen, County Mayo, on 7 March 1844, to Mark Garvey MacDonnell (1807–1889), a local Catholic landlord, and his wife, Bedelia (née O'Hara). He was educated at Summerhill College, Athlone, County Westmeath, and at the age of fifteen enrolled at Queen's College, Galway. His main area of study was the field of modern languages, and he graduated with first class honors in 1864, winning the Peel Gold Medal.

Little is known of MacDonnell's early life, as he left no memoirs nor any letters. He participated in the Literary & Debating Society (then known as the Literary and Scientific Society) at Queen's College, holding the office of vice-auditor for the 1863–1864 session. He was referred to by one of his professors as the finest debater the professor had ever seen. On leaving university in 1864, MacDonnell successfully sat the entrance examination for the Indian Civil Service, and was posted to Bengal, arriving in Calcutta in November 1865.

== India ==
On arrival in India, MacDonnell served initially in various districts of Bihar and Bengal, and on the basis of his experiences in the Bengal Famine of 1873–4, he wrote his first book, Food-Grain Supply and Famine Relief in Bihar and Bengal, published in 1876. He was appointed Accountant-General to the Provincial Government at Calcutta in 1881, and later Revenue Secretary of the province. In 1886, Lord Dufferin appointed him Home Secretary to the Central Government of India; two years later, he was created Companion of the Star of India (C.S.I.). In 1889, he became Chief Commissioner of Burma; in 1890, Chief Commissioner of the Central Provinces; and in 1893, Lieutenant-Governor of Bengal, becoming a member of the Viceroy's Executive Council. In 1893 he was also appointed a Knight Commander of the Order of the Star of India (KCSI).

In 1895, MacDonnell became Lieutenant-Governor of the North-Western Provinces and Oudh (later known as the United Provinces of Agra and Oudh). Here, in 1896, he was once again faced with famine; his efforts in the management of the famine were recognised when he was made a Knight Grand Commander of the Star of India (GCSI) in 1898. In that same year, the viceroy, Lord Elgin, requested that MacDonnell again take charge of Bengal as Lieutenant-Governor, an offer he declined due to fatigue and the frail health of his wife. He became President of the Indian Famine Commission in 1901. In that year, due to his own ill-health and that of his wife, he resigned office and left India to return to London.

MacDonnell is acknowledged as one of the ablest men to work in the Indian Civil Service, particularly in dealing with famine relief. His policies on the management of famine conditions are credited with preventing the loss of million of lives. His concern for the rights of tenants and smallholders led to the Bengal Tenancy Act of 1885, a piece of progressive legislation which protected tenant farmers from rack-rents and arbitrary eviction; a similar measure was introduced to the Northwest Provinces during his lieutenant-governorship there. However it would appear that MacDonnell was not liked within the upper echelons of the service he came to occupy. His position had been achieved through intellectual ability and dedication to each task set before him, yet he was looked down upon as his background was certainly not that of a 'gentleman,' lacking the familial connections of this contemporaries. He did, however, have a powerful friend in Lord Curzon the Viceroy. Curzon admired MacDonnell's tenacious capabilities when faced with drastic problems, qualities that were gravely lacking within Curzon himself. A further insight on MacDonnell's isolation was Curzon's somewhat cutting reference to MacDonnell as "singularly lacking any human emotion." Nevertheless, Sir Antony MacDonnell rose to some of the highest civilian offices within the British Raj. His strength and tenacity earned MacDonnell the soubriquet "The Bengal Tiger"; a colleague observed: "If Antony and another are cast away in an open boat and only one of them can live, it will not be Antony who is eaten."

MacDonnell was sworn of the Privy Council of the United Kingdom on 11 August 1902, following an announcement of the King's intention to make this appointment in the 1902 Coronation Honours list published in June that year. He was also appointed a member of the Council of India in October October 1902. It was expected that he would be appointed Governor of Bombay in that year, but instead he opted to accept an offer from George Wyndham, Chief Secretary for Ireland, to become Permanent Under-Secretary of State for Ireland, the administrative head of the Irish Government.

== The MacDonnell Hostel, Aftab Hall, Aligarh Muslim University ==
In the year 1895, Antony Patrick MacDonnell was appointed as Lieutenant Governor of North West Province and Oudh. He served in this position till the year 1901. Honouring a request for funds towards construction of a hostel at Aligarh Muslim University, MacDonnell sanctioned Rs. 20,000 from the provincial budget in 1900 for the construction of a hostel to meet lodging problems of the students at the Mohammedan Anglo-Oriental College. The construction work was completed in March 1904 and a hostel of Aftab Hall was named the MacDonnell Hostel after him.

== Under-Secretary for Ireland ==
MacDonnell was known to be sympathetic to the cause of Irish Home Rule, and his return to London elicited an offer to join his brother, Dr Mark Anthony MacDonnell, in the House of Commons as an independent nationalist. Competing for his attention, however, was a recommendation by Lord Lansdowne, his former superior as Viceroy of India, to the Chief Secretary for Ireland that MacDonnell be offered the position of Permanent Under-Secretary for Ireland, the administrative head of the Irish government.

MacDonnell entered into lengthy negotiations with Lansdowne and the Chief Secretary, George Wyndham, regarding the terms under which he would accept the position; he was not content to occupy the traditional role of an administrative civil servant, with little input into the formulation of policy. He eventually accepted the office of Under-Secretary on the explicit understanding that he would be given "adequate opportunities of influencing the policy and acts of the administration".

MacDonnell's choice to return to head the Irish administration was surprising for several reasons. The position and authority that MacDonnell enjoyed in India was greater than any he could hope to hold as Under-Secretary in Ireland. Additionally, the Government in London was in the hands of the Conservative Party; MacDonnell was a Liberal and a Catholic. The decision to offer the role to MacDonnell may have had its origins in the Conservative policy of "killing Home Rule with kindness". It is clear that MacDonnell saw his role as far more significant than that of an administrative functionary. At the time of his appointment as Under-Secretary, he was also given a seat on the Council of India, to provide an alternative should his time in Ireland fail to meet his expectations. His commitment to Ireland, however, had become clear by 1903, in which year he was offered a return to India as Governor of Bombay; King Edward VII intervened to persuade MacDonnell that he was needed more in Ireland than in India.

MacDonnell's early years as Under-Secretary were a success. The Conservative Chief Secretary, Wyndham, was supportive of constructive steps to reform systems of land tenure in Ireland, and the 1902 Land Conference resulted in the Land Purchase (Ireland) Act 1903, which allowed tenants to buy their holdings from landlords through a system of state-provided loans. Plans for reform of the Dublin Castle administration were also brought forward. Following on from these administrative reforms, MacDonnell entered more politically dangerous territory, by collaborating with several liberal landlords led by the Fourth Earl of Dunraven in drawing up a plan for the devolution of some governmental authority from the Westminster parliament to an elected council in Dublin, albeit in a manner consistent with the Act of Union 1800. The landowners involved formed a group known as the Irish Reform Association, and published the outline of the scheme in a 1904 manifesto; Lord Dunraven requested that MacDonnell formulate the plan in greater detail. Understanding that he had the support of the new Lord Lieutenant, Lord Dudley, as well as Wyndham, MacDonnell proceeded to draft a document on Dublin Castle notepaper which constituted a second devolution manifesto, and sent it to Dunraven, who had it published.

It quickly became publicly known that MacDonnell had assisted the Irish Reform Association in the drafting of the scheme. This enraged Ulster Unionist interests, who had in any event been suspicious of MacDonnell due to his known sympathies toward Home Rule. The events precipitated a political crisis; Wyndham repudiated the scheme in a letter to The Times, but by March 1905, due to repeated Unionist attacks, his position as Chief Secretary had become untenable and he was forced to resign from Cabinet. He was replaced by Walter Long, a strong unionist. MacDonnell was formally censured by the Cabinet for exceeding his powers, but remained in office. Although unable to defend himself in parliament, many aristocratic associates from his service in India remained favorably disposed towards him and defended his position. He was also helped by the fact, known among prominent government figures, that he enjoyed the strong support of King Edward VII, to whom he was quite close.

On the fall of the Balfour government in 1905, James Bryce replaced Long as Chief Secretary for Ireland in the new Liberal administration. Bryce relied heavily on MacDonnell, as did his successor, Augustine Birrell, who was appointed in 1907, and together they drafted a new devolution scheme, the Irish Council Bill, which sought to initiate a committee of Irish M.P.s to deal with legislation relating purely to Ireland. The initiative was unsuccessful, failing to secure the support of a majority of Irish Nationalist MPs.

MacDonnell's latter years in office were less eventful. One of the most colourful incidents of his later career was the crisis surrounding the theft of the regalia of the Order of St. Patrick, known popularly as the "Irish Crown Jewels", from the Office of Arms in Dublin Castle shortly before a royal visit to Ireland in 1907. His relationship with Birrell was never comfortable, and, frustrated by the lack of progress towards a workable scheme of devolution for Ireland, he resigned his post in July 1908, at the age of 64. He was a delegate for the Southern Unionists during the 1917–18 Irish Convention.

MacDonnell was appointed a Knight Commander of the Royal Victorian Order (KCVO) in 1903, and on his retirement from office in 1908 he was elevated to the peerage as Baron MacDonnell, of Swinford in the County of Mayo (a town close to his birthplace).

== Retirement ==
MacDonnell retired to London and withdrew in large part from public life. His contributions to the House of Lords tended to focus on Irish and Indian matters. He served as Chairman of the Royal Commission on the Civil Service between 1912 and 1914, and as a member of the Irish Convention of 1917–18. He accepted only two company directorships – of the Midland Great Western Railway Company, and the National Bank, of which he became vice-chairman. On the creation of the Irish Free State in 1921, he was offered a seat in the new Senate, which he declined "with much regret".

In retirement, he retained his strong interest in matters of Irish land reform. He returned to his alma mater, by then known as University College Galway, in 1911, to address the Literary and Debating Society of which he had been a distinguished officer in his student days. After a speech setting out a proposal for a workable solution to Irish agrarian demands, he finished with the patriotic lines: "Oh brave young men, my pride, my hope, my promise/It is on you my heart is set/In manliness, in kindliness, in justice,/To make Ireland a nation yet."

== Family ==
Lord MacDonnell married Henrietta MacDonell, daughter of Ewen MacDonell, chief of the Keppoch branch of the clan Macdonald, in 1878. They had one child, The Hon. Anne Margaret MacDonnell.

Lord MacDonnell died after a brief illness at his home in London on 9 June 1925, aged 81. Leaving no male heir, his barony became extinct at his death. A statue of MacDonnell by Sir George Frampton was erected at Lucknow by the Talukdars of Oudh in 1907.

== Titles ==
- 1844–1888: Antony MacDonnell
- 1888–1893: Antony MacDonnell, CSI
- 1893–1898: Sir Antony MacDonnell, KCSI
- 1898–1902: Sir Antony MacDonnell, GCSI
- 1902–1903: Sir Antony MacDonnell, GCSI, PC
- 1903–1908: Sir Antony MacDonnell, GCSI, KCVO, PC
- 1908–1925: The Right Honourable the Lord MacDonnell of Swinford, GCSI, KCVO, PC

Government offices
Preceded by Alexander Mackenzie	Chief Commissioner of the Central Provinces; 1889–1893	Succeeded by John Woodburn
Preceded by Charles Elliot	Lieutenant Governor of Bengal, Bihar, and Orissa; 1893–1895	Succeeded by Alexander Mackenzie
Preceded by Alan Cadell, acting	Lieutenant Governor of the North-Western Provinces and Chief Commissioner of Oudh; 1893–1895	Succeeded by Sir James John Digges La Touche
Preceded by Charles Alfred Elliot	Lieutenant-governor of Bengal; 1893–1895	Succeeded by Alexander Mackenzie
Peerage of the United Kingdom
New creation	Baron MacDonnell; 1908–1925	Extinct
