= Robert Henry Davies =

Sir Henry Davies KCSI CIE
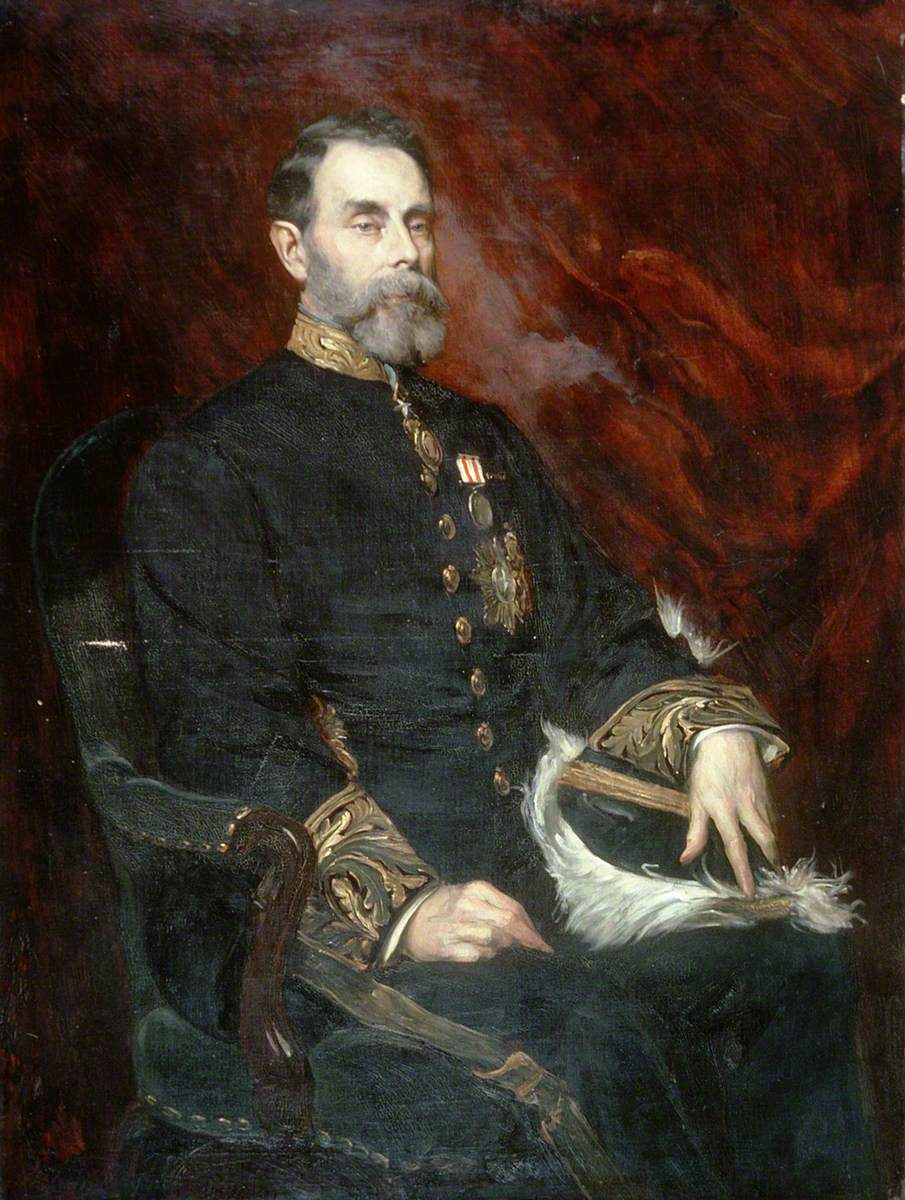

Lieutenant Governor of Punjab
- In office 20 January 1871 – 2 April 1877
- Governors General: The Earl of Mayo; The Earl of Northbrook; The Earl of Lytton
- Preceded by: Sir Henry Marion Durand
- Succeeded by: Sir Robert Eyles Egerton

Personal details
- Born: 20 September 1824
- Died: 23 August 1902 (aged 77) Chobham, England, United Kingdom
- Resting place: Thorney Abbey
- Education: East India Company College

Sir Robert Henry Davies, KCSI, CIE (20 September 1824 – 23 August 1902), known as Sir Henry Davies, was a British colonial official in British India, who served as Lieutenant Governor of the Punjab.

== Biography ==
Davies was born in 1824, the son of a Welsh physician, Sir David Davies, who was a physician to King William IV. He was educated at Charterhouse School and the East India Company College ("Haileybury"). He became a writer (clerk) in the Bengal civil service in 1844 and was an official under the East India Company and the British Raj for the rest of his career.

He served as assistant to the Commissioner of the Sutlej states, and later as settlement officer of the Lahore division. Transferring to Oudh State, he was Chief Commissioner there from 1868 until 1871 (having acted in the post 1865–66), then became Lieutenant Governor of the Punjab in 1871, serving until 1877.

Davies was created a Knight Commander of the Order of the Star of India (KCSI) in 1874, and appointed a Companion of the Order of the Indian Empire (CIE) in 1877.

After his return to the United Kingdom, he was a member of the Council of India, based in London, from 1885 until 1895, when he retired.

Davies died at Halebourne, Chobham on 23 August 1902, and is buried in the churchyard of St Mary and St Botolph, Thorney, Cambridgeshire.

== Family ==
Davies married first Jane Elizabeth Cautley, daughter of Major General G. Cautley. After the death of his first wife, he remarried Mary France Cautley, daughter of Rev. Joshua Cautley. She died in 1879. His brother, William Henry Davies, was a first-class cricketer.

Government offices
Preceded by Sir John Strachey	Chief Commissioner of Oudh; 1868–1871	Succeeded by Major General Lousada Barrow
Preceded by Sir Henry Marion Durand	Lieutenant-Governor of the Punjab; 1871–1877	Succeeded by Sir Robert Eyles Egerton
