= Edmund Drummond (disambiguation) =

Edmund Drummond may refer to:

- Edmund Drummond (born 1814), lieutenant-governor North-Western Provinces in India, and his son:
  - Edmund Drummond (Royal Navy officer) (1841–1911), Royal Navy officer
- Edmund Rupert Drummond (1884–1965), Royal Navy vice-admiral
