= Alexander Ross (civil servant) =

British civil servant in India

Alexander Ross (1800–1889) was a British civil servant in India.

== Life ==
In November 1808 he was appointed judge and magistrate of the District of Allyghur.

He was Patron of Calcutta School Book Society form its institution on 4 July 1817.

He was temporarily appointed as a Member of the council of the Governor General on 8 January 1833 on which he was confirmed on 15 October 1833.

On 1 December 1835 he was posted as Governor of the Presidency of Agra where he served for over six months until 1 June 1836. On 27 April 1836 he was re-appointed as a Member of the council of the Governor General from which he resigned on 15 October 1838. On 20 October 1837 he was appointed as President of the Council of India, and Deputy Governor of the Presidency of Fort William and of the town of Calcutta (now Kolkata. He was 1st Ordinary Member of the Supreme Council of Government of India in 1838. He was Deputy Governor in the Government of Bengal in 1838.

He was appointed Deputy Governor of the garrison at Fort William in 1838.

Government offices
Preceded by W. Blunt	Governor of Agra; 1 December 1835 – 1 June 1836	Succeeded by Sir C. T. Metcalfe as Lieutenant Governor of the North-Western Provinces
