= Couper baronets =

Baronetcy in the Baronetage of the United Kingdom

- Escutcheon of the Couper baronets
- Creation date: 1841
- Status: extant
- Motto: Virtute, By valour

The Couper Baronetcy is a title in the Baronetage of the United Kingdom. It was created on 23 June 1841 for George Couper. He was a colonel in the Army and fought in the Peninsular War, served as Military Secretary to the Governors General of Canada, Sir James Kempt and Lord Durham, and was Comptroller of the Household and Equerry to Her Royal Highness the Duchess of Kent. The second Baronet was an administrator in India and served as Governor of the North-West Provinces between 1877 and 1882. Another member of the family to gain distinction was James Kempt Couper, second son of the first Baronet. He was a general in the Army.

The family surname is pronounced "Cooper".

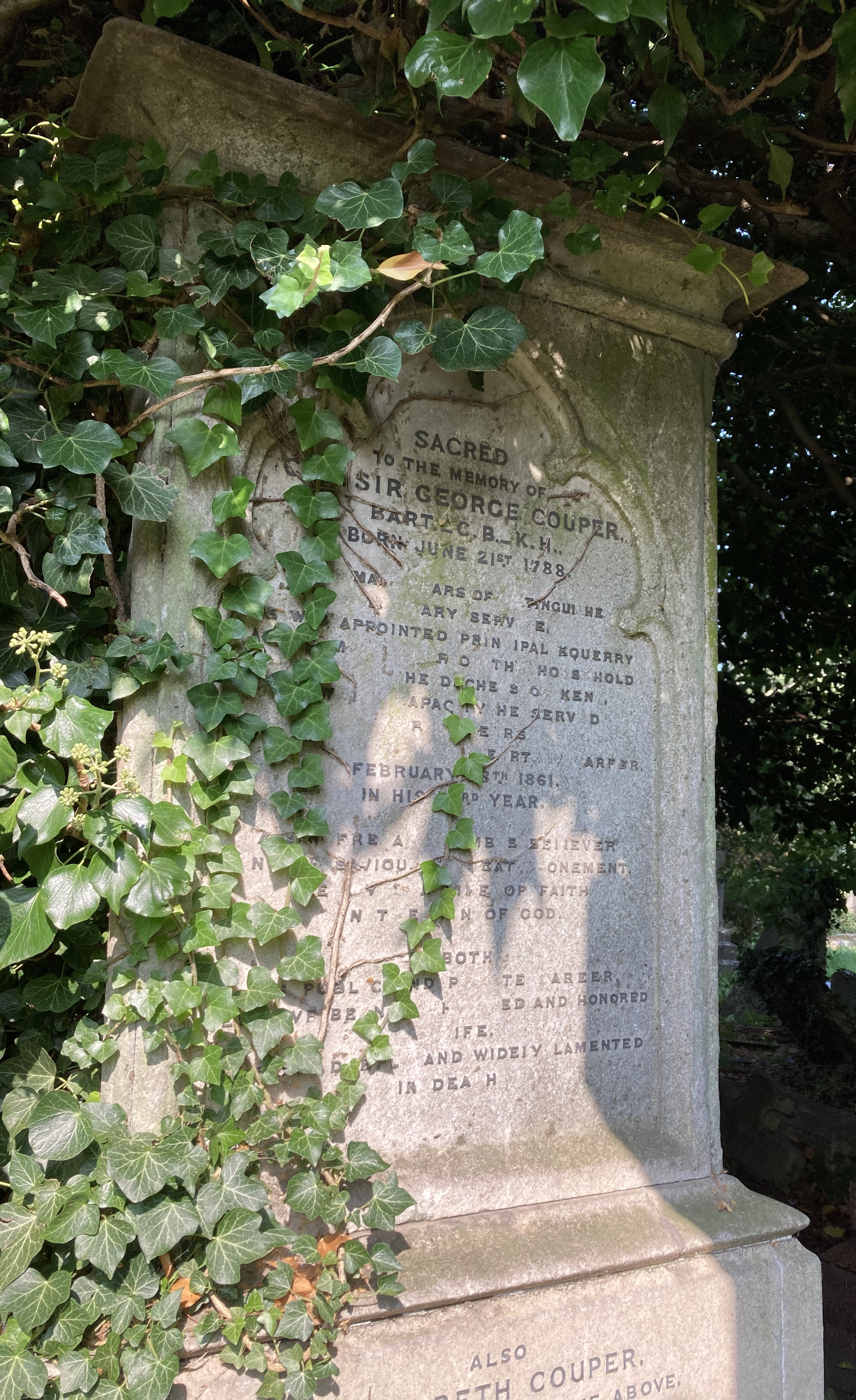
Grave of the first baronet Couper in Kensal Green Cemetery

== Couper baronets (1841) ==
- Sir George Couper, KH, CB, 1st Baronet (1788–1861)
- Sir George Ebenezer Wilson Couper, KCSI, CB, CIE, 2nd Baronet (1824–1908)
- Sir Ramsay George Henry Couper, 3rd Baronet (1855–1949)
- Sir Guy Couper, 4th Baronet (1889–1973)
- Sir George Robert Cecil Couper, 5th Baronet (1898–1975)
- Sir (Robert) Nicholas Oliver Couper, 6th Baronet (1945–2002)
- Sir James George Couper, 7th Baronet (born 1977)

There is no heir to the title.
