= Rowland Money =

British civil servant in India

Rowland Money (30 March 1812 – 2 May 1869) was a British colonial administrator in India. A member of the Bengal Civil Service, he served as acting Lieutenant-Governor of the North-Western Provinces from 27 February 1863 to 7 March 1863.

he was the son of Vice-Admiral Rowland Money.

Government offices
Preceded by Sir G. F. Edmonstone	Lieutenant Governor of the North-Western Provinces; Acting; 27 February 1863 – 7 March 1863	Succeeded by The Hon. Edmund Drummond
