= Admiral Drummond =

Admiral Drummond may refer to:

- Edmund Drummond (Royal Navy officer) (1841–1911), British Royal Navy admiral
- Edmund Rupert Drummond (1884–1965), British Royal Navy vice admiral
- James Robert Drummond (1812–1895), British Royal Navy admiral
