= James La Touche =

Irish civil servant (1844–1921)

Sir James La Touche
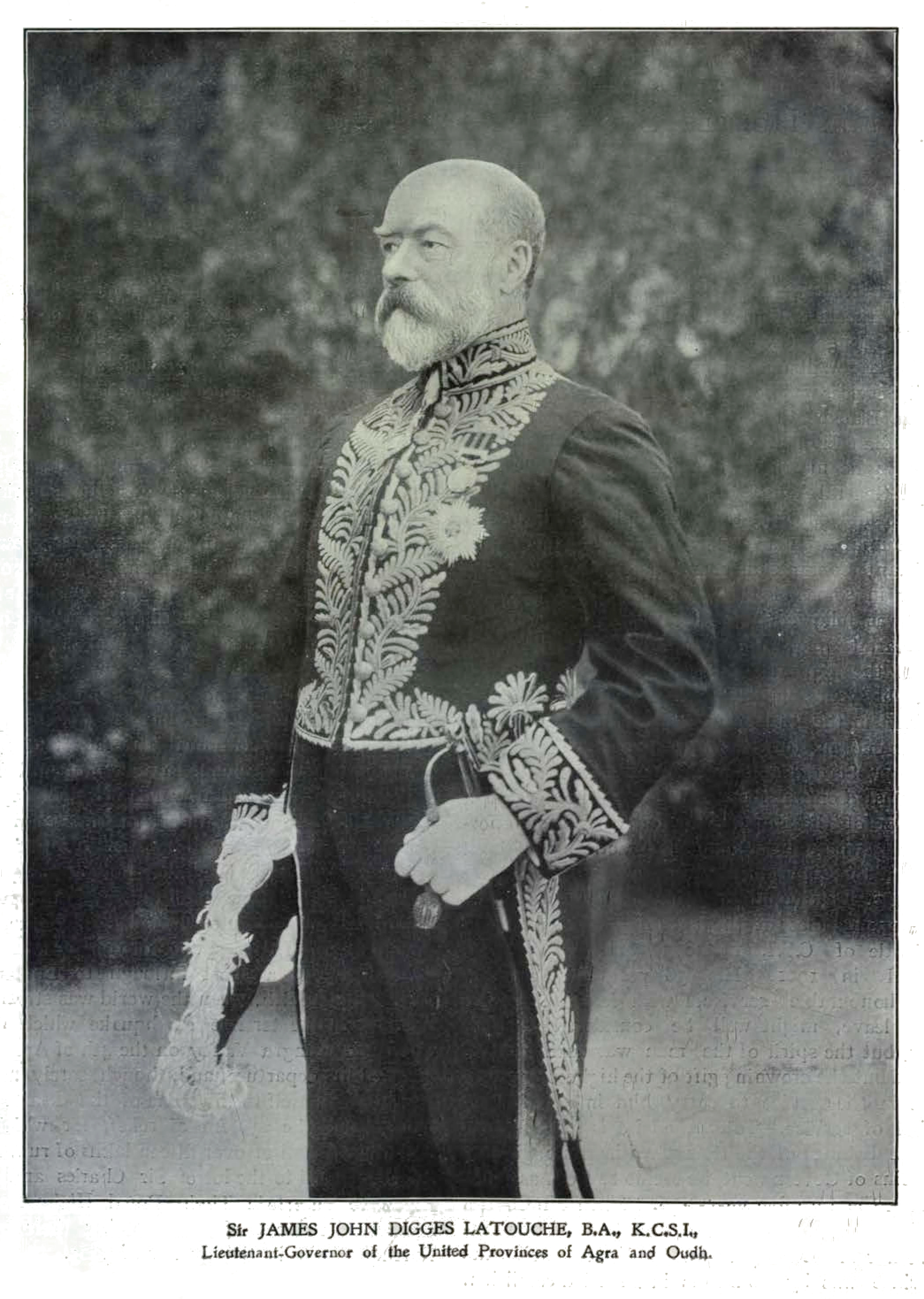
- Born: James John Digges La Touche; 16 December 1844; Dublin, Ireland
- Died: 5 October 1921 (aged 76); Dublin, Ireland
- Occupation: Colonial administrator in British India
- Spouse: Julia Mary Rothwell

Sir James John Digges La Touche, KCSI (16 December 1844 – 5 October 1921) was an Irish civil servant in British India, where he spent most of his career in the North-Western Provinces.

== Early life and education ==
La Touche was born in Dublin, the son of William Digges La Touche and Louisa L'Estrange. He was of French Huguenot ancestry. He was educated at Trinity College Dublin.

== Career in India ==
He joined the Indian Civil Service in 1867, and spent four years in Ajmir Province and four years in Upper Burma, before moving to the North-Western Provinces. In that province he served as a member of the Board of Revenue and Chief Secretary, and in 1897 acted as Lieutenant-Governor for six months, after the breakdown in health of Sir Anthony MacDonnell following the combat with the famine that year.

He was a Member of the Council of the Viceroy of India, and was in November 1901 appointed Lieutenant-Governor of the North-Western Provinces and Chief Commissioner of Oudh. In March 1902 the province was renamed the United Provinces of Agra and Oudh, and the former commissionership was abolished. La Touche continued as Lieutenant-Governor of the United Provinces of Agra and Oudh until December 1906.

The following year he was appointed a Member of the Council of the Secretary of State for India.

La Touche was appointed a Companion of the Order of the Star of India (CSI) in the 1896 New Year Honours list on 1 January 1896, and promoted to a Knight Commander (KCSI) in the 1901 Birthday Honours list on 9 November 1901.

Latouche Road in Kanpur and Latouche Road in Lucknow are named in his honour.

He retired in 1906 and returned to Ireland.

== Family ==
La Touche married, in Bombay in 1873, Julia Mary Rothwell, daughter of Thomas Wade Rothwell. They had one child, Louisa France "Lola" Digges La Touche (1879 – 31 March 1884), who died age 5 on the steamship Assam returning from India.

He died at his home, 53 Raglan Road, Dublin, aged 77.

Government offices
Preceded by Sir Anthony Patrick MacDonnell	Lieutenant-Governor of the North-Western Provinces and Chief Commissioner of Oudh; 1901-1902	Succeeded by Office abolished
Preceded by New office	Lieutenant-Governor of the United Provinces of Agra and Oudh; 1902-1906	Succeeded by Sir John Prescott Hewett
