= Agra Province =

Province of British India

Coordinates: 27.18°N 78.02°E

Agra Province was a part of the United Provinces of Agra and Oudh of British India during the closing decades of the British Raj, from 1904 until 1947; it corresponded (under Section 4(4) of United Provinces Act 1, 1904) to the former regions, Ceded and Conquered Provinces (1805–1836) and the North Western Provinces (1836–1902).

== See also ==
- Agra Presidency
- Agra Subah, Mughal precursor
- Company rule in India
- United Provinces of Agra and Oudh
- Presidencies and provinces of British India
- British Raj
