= List of lieutenant governors of the North-Western Provinces and chief commissioners of Oudh =

This is a list of lieutenant-governors of the North-Western Provinces and chief commissioners of Oudh. The provisional establishment of the joint title of Lieutenant-Governor of the North-Western Provinces and Chief Commissioner of Oudh happened in 1877 when title of Chief Commissioner of Oudh were merged until it was renamed as Lieutenant-Governor of the United Provinces of Agra and Oudh in 1902.

== Lieutenant-governors of the North-Western Provinces and Chief Commissioners of Oudh (1877–1902) ==
In 1877 the office of lieutenant governor was combined with that of Chief Commissioner of Oudh, which had existed since 1857, in the same person.

- Sir George Ebenezer Wilson Couper, 15 February 1877 – 17 April 1882, continued
- Sir Alfred Comyn Lyall, 17 April 1882 – 21 November 1887
- Sir Auckland Colvin, 21 November 1887 – 28 November 1892
- Sir Charles Haukes Todd Crosthwaite, 28 November 1892 – 9 January 1895
- Alan Cadell, 9 January 1895 – 6 November 1895, acting
- Sir Anthony Patrick MacDonnell, 6 November 1895 – 14 November 1901
- Sir James John Digges La Touche, 14 November 1901 – 22 March 1902

== See also ==
- (1732–1857) – Nawabs of Awadh
- (1834–1836) – Governors of Agra
- (1836–1877) – Lieutenant Governors of the North-Western Provinces
- (1856–1877) – Chief Commissioners of Oudh
- (1902–1921) – Lieutenant Governors of the United Provinces of Agra and Oudh
- (1921–1937) – Governors of the United Provinces of Agra and Oudh
- (1937–1950) – Governors of the United Provinces
- (1950 – cont.) – Governors of Uttar Pradesh
