= George Couper =

British civil servant (1824–1908)

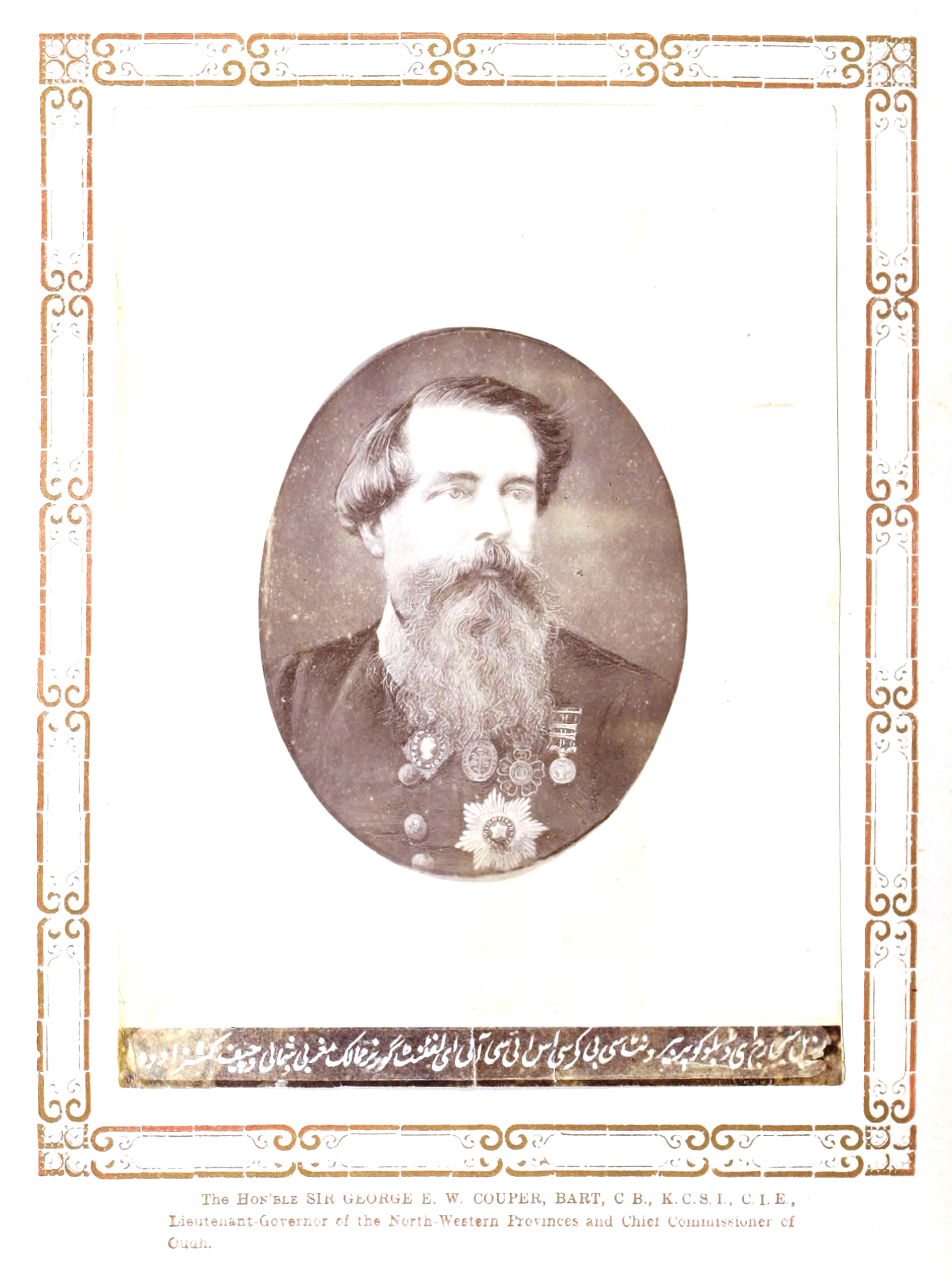
Photograph c. 1880

Sir George Ebenezer Wilson Couper, 2nd Baronet, KCSI, CB, CIE (29 April 1824 – 5 March 1908) was a British civil servant in India.

== Biography ==
Couper was the eldest son of Colonel Sir George Couper, Chief Equerry and Comptroller of the Household of Princess Victoria, Duchess of Kent. His father was created a baronet in 1841.

He was educated at the Royal Military College, Sandhurst (now Royal Military Academy Sandhurst). He was sent to India in 1846 and joined the Bengal Civil Service. He was appointed a Companion of the Order of the Bath in the 1860 Birthday Honours while serving as Secretary to the Chief Commissioner of Oude, James Outram.

From 26 July 1876 to 15 February 1877, he was Lieutenant-Governor of the North-Western Provinces. In 1877, he was created a Knight Commander of the Order of the Star of India and in 1878 a Companion of the Order of the Indian Empire.

From 15 February 1877 to 17 April 1882, he was Lieutenant Governor of the North-Western Provinces and Chief Commissioner of Oudh.

== Family ==
In 1852, he married Caroline Penelope Every, sister of Sir Henry Every, 10th Baronet. He had three sons, who were all in the military, and a daughter, who married Sir Frederick William Benson. Sir George died in Camberley, aged 84. His eldest son, Ramsay George Henry Couper, succeeded him in the baronetcy.

Government offices
Preceded by Sir John Strachey	Lieutenant Governor of the North-Western Provinces; 26 July 1876 – 15 February 1877	Merged with Lieutenant Governor of the North-Western Provinces and Chief Commissioner of Oudh
New post merging posts of Lieutenant Governor of the North-Western Provinces & Chief Commissioner of Oudh	Lieutenant Governor of the North-Western Provinces and Chief Commissioner of Oudh; 15 February 1877 – 17 April 1882	Succeeded by Sir Alfred Comyn Lyall
Baronetage of the United Kingdom
Preceded by George Couper	Baronet; 1861–1908	Succeeded by Ramsay Couper
