= Governor Ross =

Governor Ross may refer to:

- Alexander Ross (civil servant) (1800–1889), Governor of Agra from 1835 to 1836
- C. Ben Ross (1876–1946), 15th Governor of Idaho
- Edmund G. Ross (1826–1907), 13th Governor of New Mexico Territory
- Guillermo Ross (1695–1757), interim Governor of Buenos Aires in c. 1750
- Lawrence Sullivan Ross (1838–1898), 19th Governor of Texas
- Nellie Tayloe Ross (1876–1977), 14th Governor of Wyoming, wife of William B. Ross
- William H. H. Ross (1814–1887), 37th Governor of Delaware
- William B. Ross (1873–1924), 12th Governor of Wyoming
