= Lousada (name) =

Lousada is a given name and surname. Notable people with the name include:

- Anthony Baruh Lousada, British solicitor, artist and administrator
- Emanuel Lousada (1783–1854), Merchant and slave plantation owner
- Max Lousada, English music businessman
- Patricia Lousada (1929–2019), American ballet dancer and cookbook author
- Lousada Barrow
