= List of governors of Agra Presidency =

This is a list of governors of the Agra Presidency. The provisional establishment of the Governor of Agra happened in 1833 until the Agra Presidency was renamed as North-Western Provinces in 1836.

== Governors of Agra (1834–1836) ==
In 1833 an act of Parliament was passed to constitute a new presidency (province), with its capital at Agra.

#	Name	Took office	Left office	Remarks
1	Sir C. T. Metcalfe	14 November 1834	20 March 1835	-
2	W. Blunt	20 March 1835	1 December 1835	-
3	A. Ross	1 December 1835	1 June 1836	-
Graphical Timeline

== See also ==
- (1732 – 1857) - Nawabs of Awadh
- (1834 – 1836) - Governors of Agra
- (1836 – 1877) - Lieutenant Governors of the North-Western Provinces
- (1856 – 1877) - Chief Commissioners of Oudh
- (1877 – 1902) - Lieutenant Governors of the North-Western Provinces and Chief Commissioners of Oudh
- (1902 – 1921) - Lieutenant Governors of the United Provinces of Agra and Oudh
- (1921 – 1937) - Governors of the United Provinces of Agra and Oudh
- (1937 – 1950) - Governors of the United Provinces
- (1950 – cont.) - Governors of Uttar Pradesh
