= Edwin Roscoe Mullins =

British sculptor

- Born: 22 August 1848; Holborn, London
- Died: 9 January 1907 (aged 58); Walberswick, Suffolk
- Education: Marlborough College
- Alma mater: Lambeth School of Art; Royal Academy Schools
- Known for: Sculpture

Edwin Roscoe Mullins (22 August 1848- 9 January 1907) was a British sculptor known for a number of architectural sculptures and smaller works featuring neo-classical figures.

== Biography ==
Mullins was born at Holborn in central London and attended Lough Grammar School and, from 1863 to 1865, Marlborough College in Wiltshire. He trained at the Lambeth School of Art before studying at the Royal Academy Schools from 1967. In 1868 he won a gold medal in the National Art Competition for a model from the antique. Mullins was sponsored at the Royal Academy Schools by the sculptor John Birnie Philip and subsequently worked for him as an assistant before moving to Munich where he studied under Michael Wagmüller and also shared a studio with Edward Onslow Ford. In 1872 he won a silver medal at Munich and a bronze at Vienna for his work Sympathy.

Mullins returned to London around 1874. There, he created sculptures of neo-classical figures and portrait busts and statuettes and was, for a time, associated with the New Sculpture movement. He became a regular exhibitor at the Royal Academy, the New Gallery and the Grosvenor Gallery and in 1884 he was elected to the Art Workers Guild. He also exhibited with the Society of British Artists, the Glasgow Institute of the Fine Arts, at the Walker Art Gallery in Liverpool and at Manchester City Art Gallery. Mullins also received a number of public commissions and at the 1900 Exposition Universelle in Paris was awarded a silver medal. In 1890 he published A Primer of Sculpture and was appointed as an instructor in modelling for architecture at the Central School of Arts and Crafts in 1897. He died in 1907 at Walberswick in Suffolk.

== Selected public works ==
Image	Title / subject	Location and coordinates	Date	Type	Material	Dimensions	Designation	Wikidata	Notes
More images	Untitled	Gallions Hotel, Newham	1881-83	Frieze	Plaster		Grade II*	Q17553250	
	Major General Lousada Barrow	Uttar Pradesh State Museum, Lucknow	1882	Statue	Marble				
	Henry VII of England	Scott's Building, King's College, Cambridge	1883	Statue in niche	Stone		Grade II		
	School of Athens	Harris Museum and Art Gallery, Preston	1886	Sculptural pediment	Stone		Grade I	Q12059583	
	William Barnes	St Peter's Church, Dorchester, Dorset	1888	Statue on pedestal	Bronze and stone		Grade II	Q26412421	
	Tomb of John Frederick Ginnett	Woodvale Cemetery, Brighton	1893	Tomb on plinth with equine statue	Granite & Portland stone		Grade II	Q26661769	Ginnett was a circus owner.
	Study, Religion, Recreation, Health, Music	Croydon Town Hall	1896	Five decorative relief panels	Stone		Grade II	Q26483913	
	Cain	Glasgow Botanic Gardens	c. 1899	Statue	Marble				
More images	Queen Victoria	Port Elizabeth, South Africa	Unveiled 1903	Statue on pedestal	Marble			Q36692437	Commissioned for Victoria's Diamond Jubilee in 1897, unveiled in 1903 and subject to a paint attack in 2010.
