= George Frederick Edmonstone =

Sir George Frederick Edmonstone, KCB (11 April 1813 – 24 September 1864) was an administrator in India.

== Life ==
Edmonstone was born in Calcutta, the fourth son of Neil Benjamin Edmonstone (1765–1841), a member of the supreme council in India and a director of the East India Company.

In 1829 Edmonstone went to the East India College at Haileybury, the precursor of Haileybury and Imperial Service College, before proceeding to Bengal in 1831.

He held various positions in the Indian civil service before being appointed as Lieutenant-Governor of the North-Western Provinces from 19 January 1859 to 27 February 1863.

Retiring in 1863, Edmonstone was made a knight commander of the Order of the Bath (civil division) in December 1863. He died in Effingham, Surrey on 24 September 1924. There is a plaque dedicated to him in St Lawrence's Church, Effingham.

One of the houses at Haileybury and Imperial Service College was named after Edmonstone, along with other distinguished Indian civil servants.

== Time line ==
Government offices
Vacant Title last held by Sir Charles Theophilus Metcalfe	Lieutenant Governor of the North-Western Provinces; 19 January 1859 – 27 February 1863	Succeeded by R. Money (acting)
