= William Blunt =

British civil servant in India

William Blunt (1800–1889) as a British civil servant in India.

Like all other civil servants until the introduction of competitive examinations in the 1850s, Blunt had studied at Haileybury in Hertfordshire in 1846 with Highly Distinguished distinction and stood at 7th position with 2nd class among students of Bengal.

In 1797, he was appointed as Senior Member of the Board of Customs, Salt and Opium.

In 1820, Blunt became the Commissioner in Cuttack and Superintendent of Tributary Mahals. In 1829, George Stockwell succeeded Blunt as the Superintendent of Tributary Mahals.

He married Eliza Jane, the daughter of Lieutenant Colonel Goddard Richards, at Midnapore on 23 December 1821.

He was Special Commissioner to David Scott (Agent to the Governor-General on the North-East Frontier) during the Burmese War of May 1828.

From 11 November 1830 to 20 March 1835, he was Member of the Council of the Governor General.

On 20 March 1835, he was posted as Governor of the Presidency of Agra and served for over eight months, until 1 December 1835.

From December 1835 to April 1836 (possibly later), he was a judge of the Courts of Ṣadr Dīwānī ʿAdālat and Ṣadr Nizāmat ʿAdālat at the Bengal Presidency.

In 1841 he was Officiating Member of the Board of Customs, Salt and Opium and the Marine Board at Loudon buildings in Calcutta (Now Kolkata).

Government offices
Preceded by Sir C. T. Metcalfe	Governor of Agra; 20 March 1835 – 1 December 1835	Succeeded by A. Ross
