= List of governors of the United Provinces of Agra and Oudh =

This is a list of Governors of the United Provinces of Agra and Oudh. The establishment of the title of Lieutenant-Governor of the United Provinces of Agra and Oudh happened in 1902 by renaming of the title of Lieutenant-Governor of the North-Western Provinces and Chief Commissioner of Oudh until it was renamed as Governor of the United Provinces in 1937.

== Lieutenant-governors of the United Provinces of Agra and Oudh (1902–1921) ==
In 1902, the province was renamed the United Provinces of Agra and Oudh. With the new name, the former commissionership was abolished.

- Sir James John Digges La Touche, 22 March 1902 – 1 January 1907, continued.
- Sir John Prescott Hewett, 1 January 1907 – 15 September 1912.
  - Sir Leslie Alexander Selim Porter, 30 April 1910 – 20 October 1910, acting for Hewett, first time.
  - Sir Leslie Alexander Selim Porter, 1 April 1911 – 16 December 1911, acting for Hewett, second time.
- Sir James Scorgie Meston, 15 September 1912 – 7 February 1917.
  - Sir Duncan Colvin Baillie, 18 September 1913 – 15 November 1913, acting for Meston.
- John Mitchell Holmes, 7 February 1917 – 15 February 1918, acting.
- Sir Spencer Harcourt Butler, 15 February 1918 – 3 January 1921.

== Governors of the United Provinces of Agra and Oudh (1921–1937) ==
In 1921, the office was upgraded to governor.

- Sir Spencer Harcourt Butler, 3 January 1921 – 21 December 1922, continued
- Sir Ludovic Charles Porter, 21 December 1922 – 24 December 1922, acting
- Sir William Sinclair Marris, 24 December 1922 – 14 January 1927
  - Sir Samuel Perry O'Donnell, 13 August 1926 – 1 December 1926, acting for Marris
- Sir Alexander Phillips Muddiman, 14 June 1927 – 17 June 1928
- Sir William Malcolm Hailey, 9 August 1928 – 6 December 1934
  - Sir George Bancroft Lambert, 16 October 1930 – 19 April 1931, acting for Hailey
  - Nawab Sir Muhammad Ahmad Said Khan Chhatari, KCIE, MBE 8 April 1933 – 27 November 1933, acting for Hailey
- Sir Harry Graham Haig, 6 December 1934 – 1 April 1937

== Development of position ==
- (1732 – 1857) - Nawabs of Awadh.
- (1834 – 1836) - Governors of Agra.
- (1836 – 1877) - Lieutenant-Governors of the North-Western Provinces.
- (1856 – 1877) - Chief Commissioners of Oudh.
- (1877 – 1902) - Lieutenant-Governors of the North-Western Provinces and Chief Commissioners of Oudh.
- (1937 – 1950) - Governors of the United Provinces.
- (1950 – cont.) - Governors of Uttar Pradesh.
