= John Strachey (civil servant) =

East India Company civil servant (1823–1907)

Sir John Strachey GCSI CIE
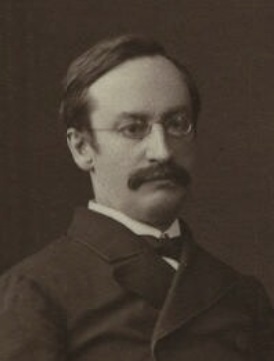
- Portrait by Elliott & Fry, 1876

Lieutenant-Governor of the North-Western Provinces
- In office 1874–1876
- Governor-General: The Lord Northbrook
- Preceded by: Sir William Muir
- Succeeded by: Sir George Couper

Personal details
- Born: 5 June 1823 London, England
- Died: 19 December 1907 (aged 84)
- Relations: Richard Strachey (brother)

Sir John Strachey GCSI CIE (5 June 1823 – 19 December 1907) was a British civil servant and writer in India who served as Lieutenant-Governor of the North-Western Provinces from 1874 to 1876. He was briefly acting Governor-General in February 1872 (following Lord Mayo's assassination), before being replaced by the more appropriate Lord Napier who acted for the remainder of time until Lord Northbrook arrived.

== Life ==
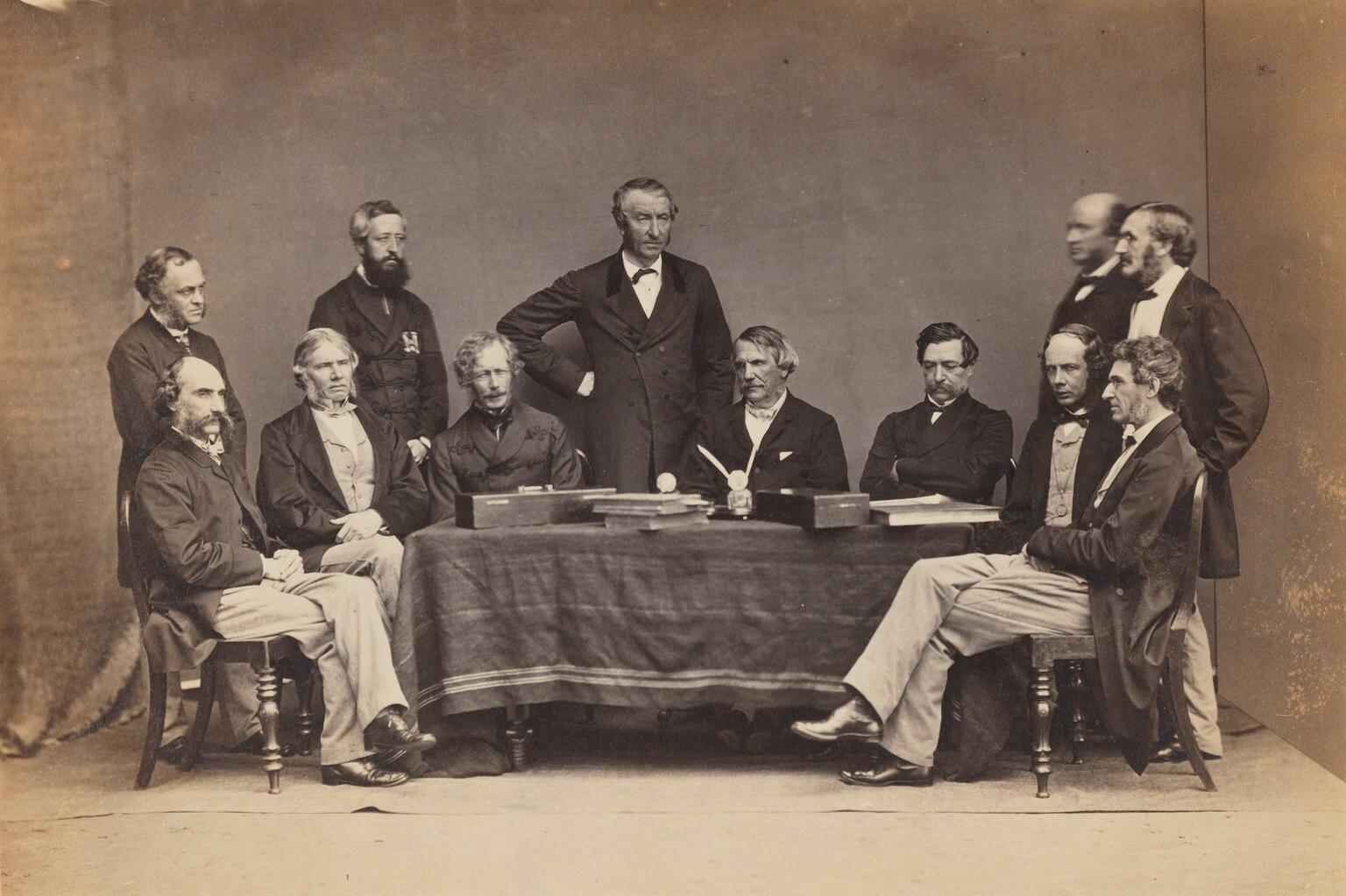
John Strachey, standing at right end, with John Lawrence, Viceroy of India and other council members. c. 1864

The fifth son of Edward Strachey, second son of Sir Henry Strachey, 1st Baronet, he was born in London, England. After passing through the East India Company College, Strachey entered the Bengal civil service in 1842, and served in the North-Western Provinces, occupying a number of important positions. His brother was Sir Richard Strachey.

In 1861, Lord Canning appointed him president of a commission to investigate the great cholera epidemic of that year. In 1862 he became judicial commissioner in the Central Provinces. In 1864, after the report of the royal commission on the sanitary condition of the army, a permanent sanitary commission was established in India, with Strachey as president. In 1866, he became Chief Commissioner of Oudh, having been chosen by Lord Lawrence to remedy as far as possible the injustice done after the Indian rebellion of 1857 by the confiscation of the rights of tenants and small proprietors of land, maintaining at the same time the privileges of the Talukdars of great landlords. As member of the legislative council he introduced several bills for that purpose, which, with the full approval of the Talukdars, passed into law.

In 1868, Stratchey became a member of the governor-general's council, and on the assassination of Lord Mayo in February 1872 he acted temporarily as Viceroy and Governor-General. After only several weeks, he was replaced by, the more apt and competent, Lord Napier, who acted until the officially appointed Lord Northbrook arrived in May. In 1874 he was appointed lieutenant-governor of the North-Western Provinces. In 1876, by request of Lord Lytton and the secretary of state, he consented to relinquish that office, and returned to the governor-general's council as financial minister, which post he retained until 1880.

During this time, while Lord Lytton was viceroy, important reforms were carried out. The measures for decentralizing financial administration, initiated under Lord Mayo, were practically completed. The salt duties were reduced, and the system under which they were levied was altered, and that opprobrium of the administration, the inland customs line, was abolished. The removal of all import duties, including those on English cotton goods, and the establishment of complete free trade, was declared to be the fixed policy of the government, and this was in great measure carried into effect before 1880, when Strachey left India.

The system under which military accounts were kept occasioned an erroneous estimate of the cost of the Second Afghan War of 1878–80. For this error Strachey was technically responsible; it was made the occasion of a partisan attack, which resulted in his resignation. From 1885 to 1895 Strachey was a member of the council of the Secretary of State for India. He died in 1907.

== Works ==
Strachey was joint author with his brother Lt-Gen Sir Richard Strachey of The Finances and Public Works of India (1882), besides writing India (3rd edition, 1903), and Hastings and the Rohilla War (1892). He also planned and designed the construction of The Rail-cum-Road Bridge on River Yamuna in Agra. He didn't get to see the completion of the Arch Bridge as he died in 1907. The bridge was completed in 1908, taking 10 years to complete since its construction commenced in 1898. The 1,024-metre-long (3,360 ft) bridge was named after John Strachey as Strachey Bridge. It is still functional even being 112 years old carrying trains in Agra Cantonment Railway Station on Delhi - Bhopal Main line to Tundla Junction Railway station in Delhi - Howrah Main Line.

== Family ==
Strachey married Katherine Batten, daughter of George Batten, on 9 October 1856, and they had eight children. They included Sir Arthur Strachey (1858–1901), judge in India. Their daughter Winifred married Hugh Shakespear Barnes.

== Legacy ==
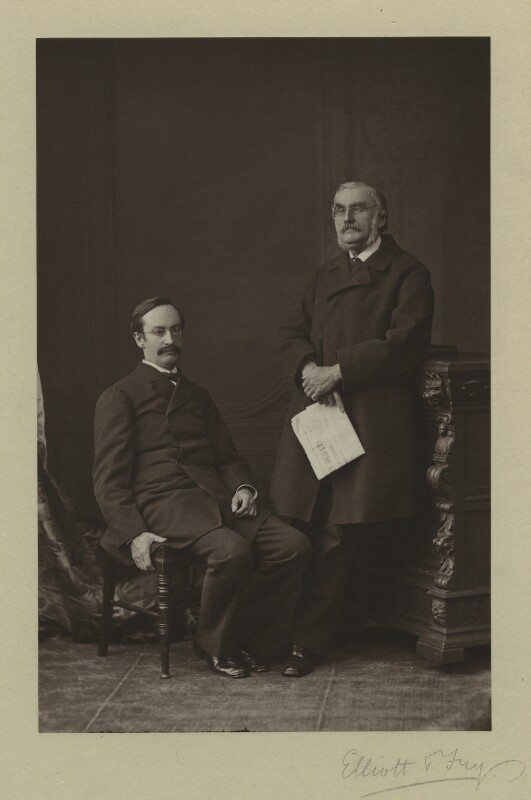
Sir John Strachey (left), together with his brother Sir Richard, 1876.

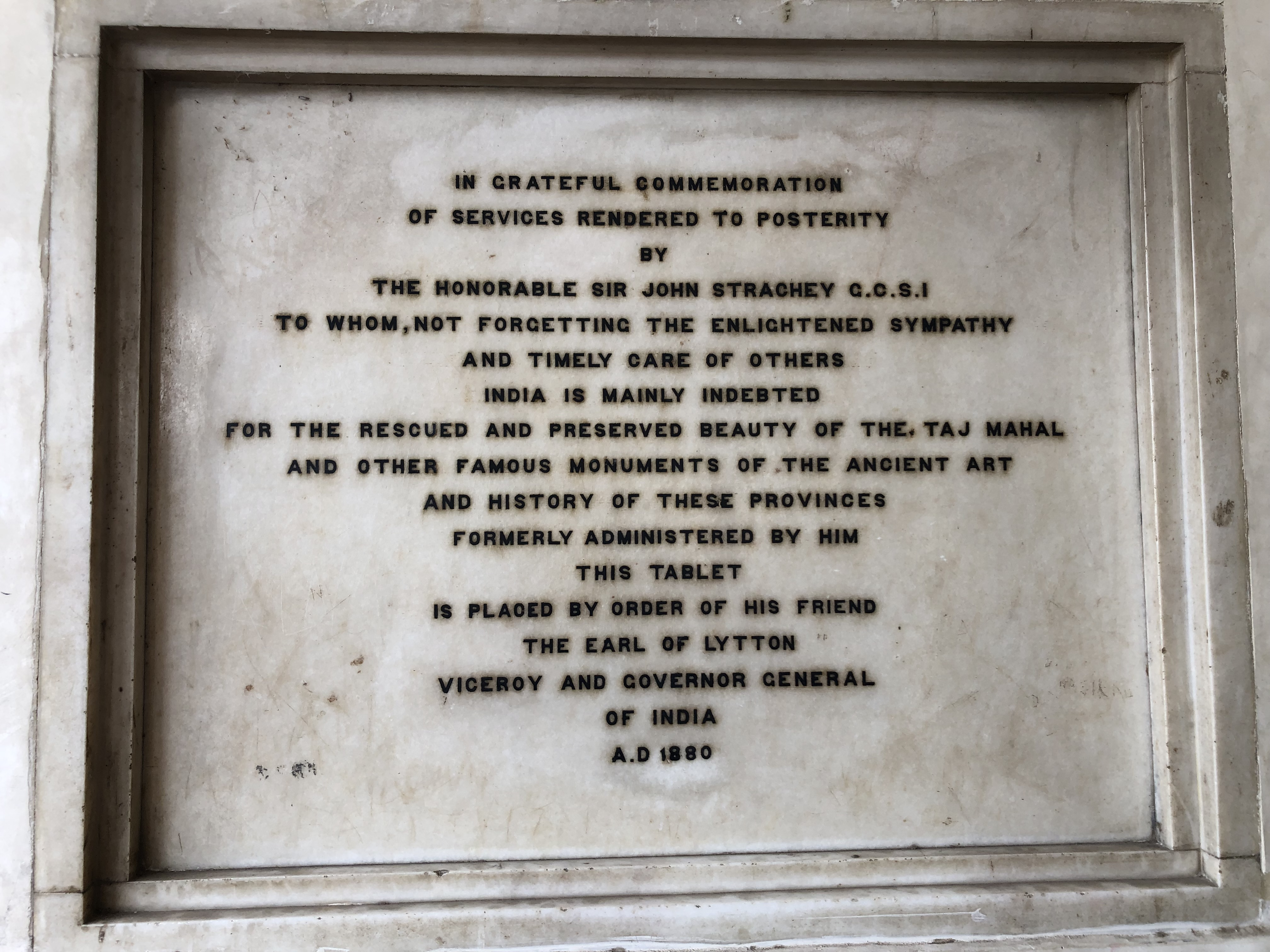
Commemorative Tablet to Sir John Strachey at the Agra Fort

Strachey was a great patron of the Muhammadan Anglo-Oriental College, Aligarh. The Strachey Hall in Aligarh Muslim University is named after him.

In the Agra Fort there is a tablet commemorating Strachey’s efforts in the conservation of Mughal architecture. The tablet is located in the south-east corner of the Machchi Bhawan ('Fish Quarters'), very close to the Saman Burj (Jasmine Tower), from which Mughal Emperor Shah Jahan gazed east across the River Yamuna to his creation, the Taj Mahal. The tablet reads:

In grateful commemoration of services rendered to posterity by the Honorable Sir John Strachey G.C.S.I. to whom, not forgetting the enlightened sympathy and timely care of others India is mainly indebted for the rescued and preserved beauty of the Taj Mahal and other famous monuments of the ancient art and history of provinces formerly administered by him This tablet is placed by order of his friend the Earl of Lytton Viceroy and Governor General of India A.D. 1880

During his period as Lieutenant-Governor of the North-Western Provinces Strachey directed restoration of the Machchi Bhawan and the nearby Diwan-i-Am (Hall of Audience), which had been subject to looting by the East India Company in the early British colonial period.

== See also ==
- Strachey Baronets

== Sources ==
Government offices
Preceded by The Earl of Mayo	Viceroy of India, acting 1872	Succeeded by The Lord Napier, acting
Preceded by Sir William Muir	Lieutenant Governor of the North-Western Provinces; 1874–1876	Succeeded by Sir G. E. W. Couper
