= List of governors of Uttar Pradesh =

Governors of U. P. State

Governor of Uttar Pradesh
- Uttara Pradēśa kē Rājyapāla
- Emblem of Uttar Pradesh

- Flag of India

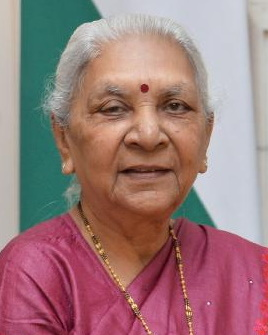
- Incumbent; Anandiben Patel since 29 July 2019
- Style: Her Excellency
- Type: Governor
- Residence: Lok Bhavan; Lucknow
- Appointer: President of India
- Term length: At the pleasure of the president
- Inaugural holder: Hormasji Peroshaw Mody
- Formation: 26 January 1950; 76 years ago
- Salary: ₹470,000 (US$4,900) per month
- Website: Governor of Uttar Pradesh

The governor of Uttar Pradesh (ISO: Uttara Pradēśa kē Rājyapāla) is the constitutional head of the Indian state of Uttar Pradesh. The governor is appointed by the president of India. The post is preceded by the governor of United Provinces of pre-independent India as well as independent India from 15 August 1947 to 25 January 1950. The province was renamed as Uttar Pradesh on 24 January 1950.

== Powers and functions ==
The governor has:

- Executive powers related to administration, appointments and removals,
- Legislative powers related to lawmaking and the state legislature, that is Vidhan Sabha or Vidhan Parishad, and
- Discretionary powers to be carried out according to the discretion of the Governor.

In his ex-officio capacity, the governor of Uttar Pradesh is chancellor of the universities of Uttar Pradesh as per the Acts of the Universities.

== List ==
Legend

- ^{†} Died in office
- ^{§} Transferred
- ^{‡} Resigned/removed

Color key

- indicates acting/additional charge

#	Portrait	Name (born – died)	Home state	Tenure in office			Appointer (President)
#	Portrait	Name (born – died)	Home state	From	To	Time in office	Appointer (President)
1		Hormasji Pherozeshah Mody (1881–1969)	Bombay	26 January 1950	1 June 1952	2 years, 127 days	Rajendra Prasad
2		Kanaiyalal Maneklal Munshi (1887–1971)	Bombay	2 June 1952	9 June 1957	5 years, 7 days	Rajendra Prasad
3		V. V. Giri (1894–1980)	Madras	10 June 1957	30 June 1960^{[§]} (Note: Transferred as the Governor of Kerala)	3 years, 20 days	Rajendra Prasad
4		Burgula Ramakrishna Rao (1899–1967)	Andhra Pradesh	1 July 1960	15 April 1962	1 year, 288 days	Rajendra Prasad
5		Bishwanath Das (1889–1984)	Orissa	16 April 1962	30 April 1967	5 years, 14 days	Rajendra Prasad
6		Bezawada Gopala Reddy (1907–1997)	Andhra Pradesh	1 May 1967	30 June 1972	5 years, 60 days	Sarvepalli Radhakrishnan
7		Justice; Shashi Kanta Verma (Acting)	Uttar Pradesh	1 July 1972	13 November 1972	135 days	V. V. Giri
8		Akbar Ali Khan (1899–1994)	Andhra Pradesh	14 November 1972	24 October 1974^{[§]} (Note: Transferred as the Governor of Orissa)	1 year, 344 days	V. V. Giri
9		Marri Chenna Reddy (1919–1996)	Andhra Pradesh	25 October 1974	1 October 1977^{[‡]}	2 years, 341 days	Fakhruddin Ali Ahmed
10		Ganpatrao Devji Tapase (1909–1992)	Maharashtra	2 October 1977	27 February 1980^{[§]} (Note: Transferred as the Governor of Haryana)	2 years, 148 days	Neelam Sanjiva Reddy
11		Chandeshwar Prasad Narayan Singh (1901–1994)	Bihar	28 February 1980	31 March 1985	5 years, 31 days	Neelam Sanjiva Reddy
12		Mohammed Usman Arif (1923–1995)	Rajasthan	31 March 1985	11 February 1990	4 years, 317 days	Zail Singh
13		B. Satya Narayan Reddy (1927–2012)	Andhra Pradesh	12 February 1990	25 May 1993^{[§]}	3 years, 102 days	Ramaswamy Venkataraman
14		Motilal Vora (1928–2020)	Madhya Pradesh	26 May 1993	3 May 1996^{[‡]}	2 years, 343 days	Shankar Dayal Sharma
15		Mohammad Shafi Qureshi (1928–2016) (Additional charge)	Jammu and Kashmir	3 May 1996	19 July 1996	77 days	Shankar Dayal Sharma
16		Romesh Bhandari; IFS (Retd) (1928–2013)	Punjab	19 July 1996	17 March 1998^{[‡]}	1 year, 241 days	Shankar Dayal Sharma
17		Mohammad Shafi Qureshi (1928–2016) (Additional charge)	Jammu and Kashmir	17 March 1998	19 April 1998	33 days	K. R. Narayanan
18		Suraj Bhan (1928–2006)	Haryana	20 April 1998	23 November 2000^{[§]} (Note: Transferred as the Governor of Himachal Pradesh)	2 years, 217 days	K. R. Narayanan
19		Vishnu Kant Shastri (1929–2005)	West Bengal	24 November 2000	2 July 2004^{[‡]}	3 years, 221 days	K. R. Narayanan
20		Sudarshan Agarwal (1931–2019) (Additional charge)	Punjab	3 July 2004	7 July 2004	4 days	A. P. J. Abdul Kalam
21		T. V. Rajeswar; IPS (Retd) (1926–2018)	Tamil Nadu	8 July 2004	27 July 2009	5 years, 19 days	A. P. J. Abdul Kalam
22		Banwari Lal Joshi; IPS (Retd) (1936–2017)	Rajasthan	28 July 2009	17 June 2014^{[‡]}	4 years, 324 days	Pratibha Patil
23		Aziz Qureshi (1941–2024) (Additional charge)	Madhya Pradesh	17 June 2014	22 July 2014	35 days	Pranab Mukherjee
24		Ram Naik (born 1934)	Maharashtra	22 July 2014	28 July 2019	5 years, 6 days	Pranab Mukherjee
25		Anandiben Patel (born 1941)	Gujarat	29 July 2019	Incumbent	7 years, 76 days	Ram Nath Kovind

== Timeline ==
Timeline of Uttar Pradesh governors

== Oath ==
“I, A. B., do swear in the name of God/solemly affirm that I will faithfully execute the office of Governor (or discharge the functions of the Governor) of .............(name of the State) and will to the best of my ability preserve, protect and defend the Constitution and the law and that I will devote myself to the service and well-being of the people of ..………(name of the State).”Main, [Name], Ishwar ki shapath leta hoon (ya nishtha se pratigya karta hoon) ki main sachhe mann se Governor (Rajyapal) ke roop mein [State Name] ke pad ka karyabhar sambhalunga (ya zimmedari uthaunga). Main apni poori kabiliyat se Samvidhan (Constitution) aur kanoon (Law) ki raksha, suraksha aur bachaav karunga, aur main apne aap ko [State Name] ki janta ki seva aur kalyan (well-being) mein samarpit karunga."

== See also ==
- Uttar Pradesh
- (1732–1857) – Nawabs of Awadh
- (1834–1836) – Governors of Agra
- (1836–1877) – Lieutenant Governors of the North-Western Provinces
- (1856–1877) – Chief Commissioners of Oudh
- (1877–1902) – Lieutenant Governors of the North-Western Provinces and Chief Commissioners of Oudh
- (1902–1921) – Lieutenant Governors of the United Provinces of Agra and Oudh
- (1921–1937) – Governors of the United Provinces of Agra and Oudh
- (1937–1950) – Governors of the United Provinces
- Chief Minister of Uttar Pradesh
- Governors of India
