= Ceded and Conquered Provinces =

Region of British India under Company rule (1805–34)

- Region of the British Empire in India
- 1805–1834
- Map of the Ceded and Conquered Provinces (1805). The Kumaon Division was annexed in 1816.
- Capital: Agra
- Area
  - 1835 (?): 9,479 km^{2} (3,660 sq mi)
- Population
  - 1835 (?): 4,500,000
- History
  - Established: 1805
  - Disestablished: 1834
Preceded by	Succeeded by
Mughal Empire; Maratha Empire	Agra Presidency; North-Western Provinces
- Today part of: Portions in Uttar Pradesh; Uttarakhand; Delhi

"A Tamarind tree at Allahabad", water color (1814) by Sita Ram, an artist who accompanied Lord Moira, Governor-General of India on a journey from Calcutta—through the Ceded and Conquered Provinces—to Delhi.

The Ceded and Conquered Provinces constituted a region in northern India that was ruled by the British East India Company from 1805 to 1834; it corresponded approximately—in present-day India—to all regions in Uttar Pradesh state with the exception of the Lucknow and Faizabad divisions of Awadh; in addition, it included the Delhi territory and, after 1816, the Kumaun division and a large part (Note: It included the districts of Chamoli, Pauri, Dehradun, and Rudraprayag in present-day Garhwal division of Uttarakhand state; the Haridwar district of Uttarakhand had become a part of the Ceded and Conquered Provinces in 1805. The two remaining districts, Tehri Garhwal and Uttarkashi, of present-day Garhwal division of Uttarakhand state were part of the princely state of Tehri, and never a part of the Ceded and Conquered Provinces.) of the Garhwal division of present-day Uttarakhand state. In 1836, the region became the North-Western Provinces (under a Lieutenant-Governor), and in 1904, the Agra Province within the United Provinces of Agra and Oudh.

== Ceded Provinces ==
At the start of the 19th century, only the Benares division and the fort of Allahabad in present-day Uttar Pradesh were under British rule. In 1801, the Nawab of Awadh, Saadat Ali, ceded some territory to the British in return for protection against a threat of attack from the north-west by Zaman Shah Durrani, the grandson of Ahmad Shah Durrani. The territory included the Gorakhpur and Rohilkhand divisions; the districts of Allahabad, Fatehpur, Cawnpore, Etawah, Mainpuri, Etah; the southern part of Mirzapur; and the terai parganas of Kumaun, and came to be known as the Ceded Provinces. A year later the Nawab of Farrukhabad ceded Farrukhabad district to the British.

== Conquered Provinces ==
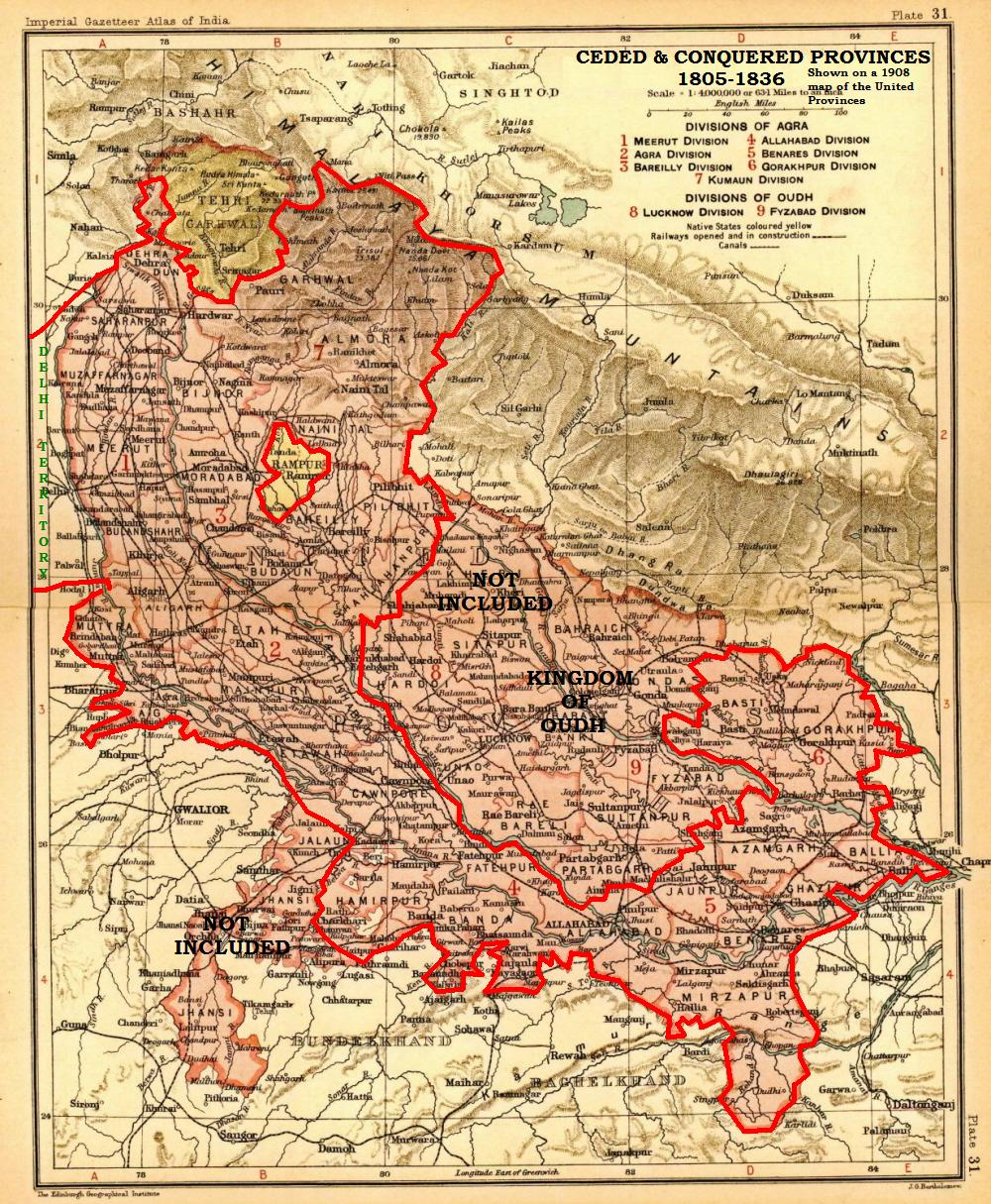
A more detailed map showing the Ceded and Conquered Provinces on a later (1908) map of the United Provinces.

With the outbreak the Second Anglo-Maratha War, General Lake, took the Meerut division (including Aligarh, after the Battle of Ally Ghur), and soon, the rest of the Agra division (including Agra city), and the districts around Delhi. In addition, most of the trans-Jamuna districts of Banda and Hamirpur were added, as well as a small area in Jalaun district.

In 1816, under the Treaty of Sugauli signed at the conclusion of the Anglo-Nepalese War (1814–1816), the Kumaon division and Dehradun district of present-day Uttarakhand state were annexed as well.

== Administration ==
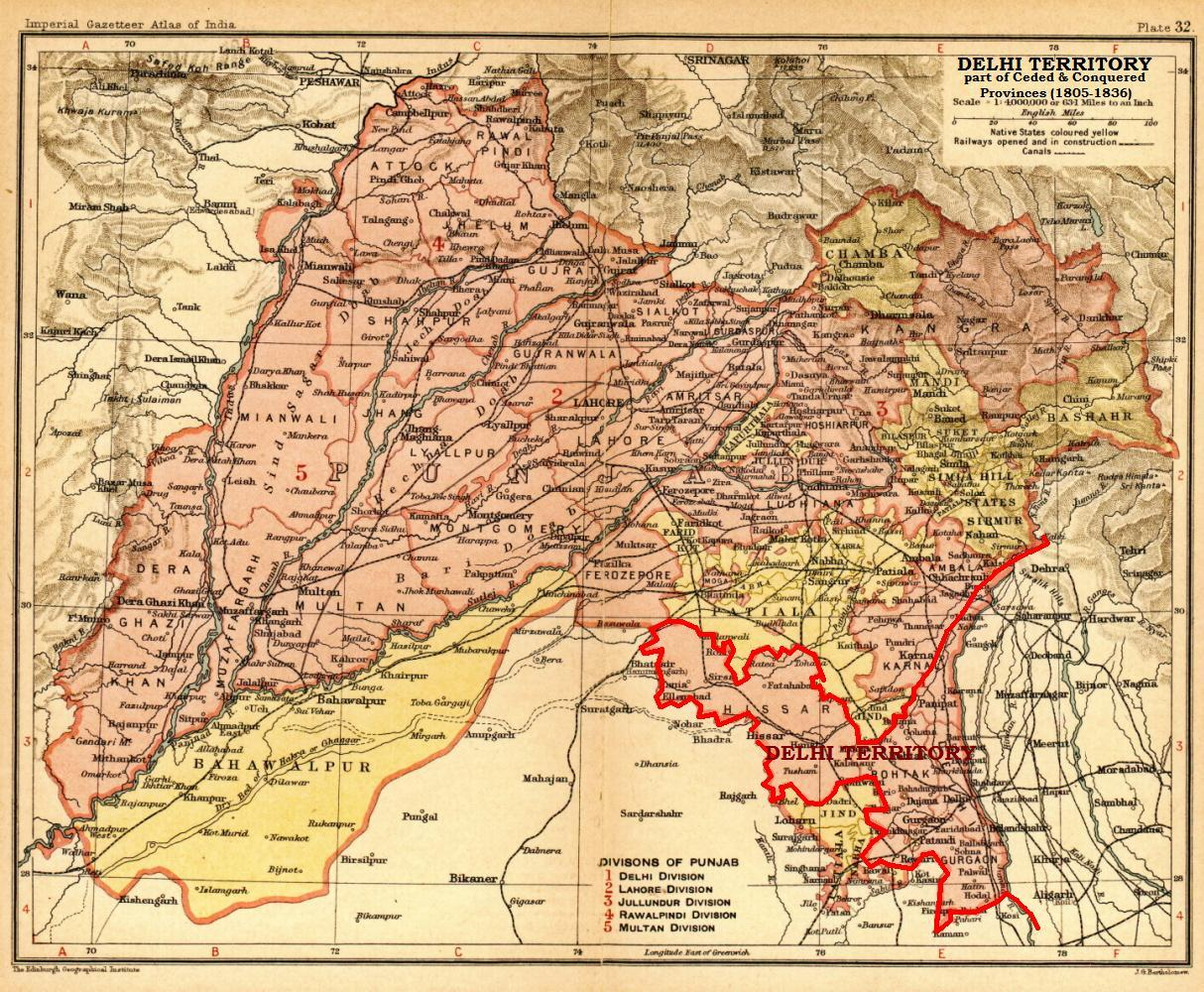
The "Delhi Territory", shown here in a 1908 map of Punjab province, was a part of the Ceded and Conquered Provinces.

The Ceded and Conquered Provinces were a part of the Bengal Presidency of British India under the administration of the Governor-General-in-Council. The great distance of the newly acquired territory from the capital of the presidency in Calcutta created administrative hitches. In response, a number of temporary arrangements were attempted, but proved to be less than optimal; finally, in 1831, an independent Board of Revenue and a separate Sadr Diwani and Nizamat Adalat (Chief Civil and Criminal Courts) were created for these provinces. In 1833, an act of the British Parliament, the Government of India Act 1833 (3 & 4 Will. 4. c. 85) concurrently promulgated the division of the Bengal Presidency, the elevation the Ceded and Conquered Provinces to the new Presidency of Agra, and the appointment of a new Governor for the latter. However, the plan was never carried out, and in 1835 another act of Parliament, the India (North-West Provinces) Act 1835 (5 & 6 Will. 4. c. 52) renamed the region the North Western Provinces, this time to be administered by a Lieutenant-Governor, the first of whom, Sir Charles Metcalfe, would be appointed in 1836.

== See also ==
- Company rule in India
- United Provinces of Agra and Oudh
- British Raj
