= William Davies (cricketer, born 1825) =

English cricketer

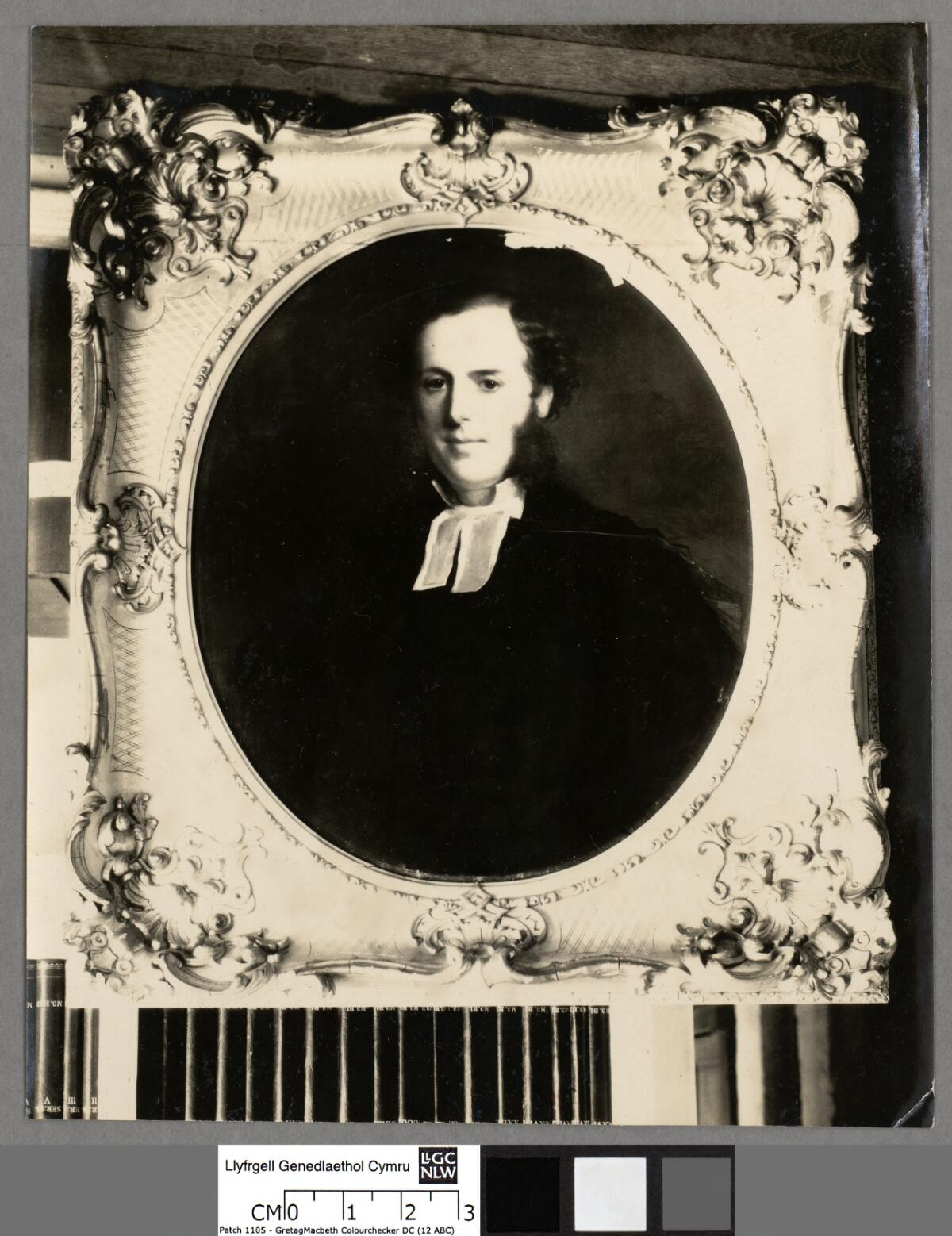

Personal information
- Full name: William Henry Davies
- Born: 30 December 1825; Hampton, Middlesex, England
- Died: 13 January 1868 (aged 42) at sea, off South Africa
- Batting: Unknown
- Bowling: Unknown

Domestic team information
- Years: Team
- 1846–1848: Oxford University

Career statistics
| Competition | First-class |
|---|---|
| Matches | 5 |
| Runs scored | 114 |
| Batting average | 16.28 |
| 100s/50s | –/– |
| Top score | 38 |
| Balls bowled | 40 |
| Wickets | 4 |
| Bowling average | ? |
| 5 wickets in innings | – |
| 10 wickets in match | – |
| Best bowling | 2/? |
| Catches/stumpings | 5/– |
- Source: Cricinfo, 9 April 2020

William Henry Davies (30 December 1825 – 13 January 1868) was an English first-class cricketer and clergyman.

Davies was born in December 1825 at Hampton to the Welsh physician, Sir David Davies, who became a physician to William IV. He was educated at Charterhouse School, before going up to Christ Church, Oxford.

While studying at Oxford, he played first-class cricket for Oxford University from 1846–48, making eight appearances. He scored 204 runs in his eight appearances, averaging 14.57 and with a high score of 47. In addition to playing for Oxford University, he also appeared for a combined Oxford and Cambridge Universities team against the Gentlemen of England at Lord's in 1848.

He played county level cricket for Shropshire between 1847 and 1854 while playing at club level for Shrewsbury, and was a co-founder of the Free Foresters Cricket Club in 1850.

After graduating from Oxford, he took holy orders in the Church of England. His ecclesiastical career after graduating from Oxford is unclear, though it is known he was chaplain at St George's Hospital until his death, aged 42, at sea off the coast off the Cape of Good Hope of South Africa in January 1868. His brother was Sir Robert Henry Davies, a colonial official in British India.
