= Herbert William Emerson =

British India public servant (1881–1962)

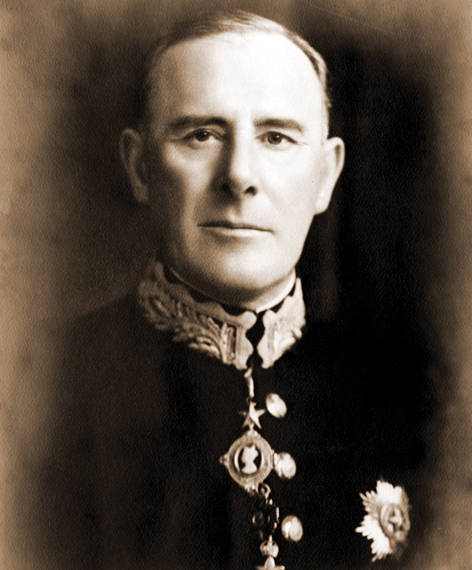
Former Governor of Punjab

Sir Herbert William Emerson, GCIE, KCSI, CBE (1 June 1881 — 13 April 1962) was a civil servant in British India and served as the Governor of Punjab in the 1930s. Emerson University Multan was earlier known as Emerson College Multan, named after Sir Emerson's services as Governor Punjab in 1930.

== Early life ==
He was born on 1 June 1881, at West Kirby, England to Stephen S. Emerson and Emelia Susan Emerson. He was educated at Calday Grange School and Magdalene College, Cambridge.

== Career ==
=== Early career ===
He was appointed to the Indian Civil Service in 1904 and served as an Assistant Commissioner at Punjab. Between 1911 and 1914, he served as the Manager of the princely state of Bushahr. In 1916 he became Superintendent and Settlement Officer of Mandi State. The following year he was made an Assistant Commissioner and Settlement Officer in the Punjab, and in 1922 became Deputy Commissioner.

=== Home Secretary ===
From April 1930 to April 1933, he served as the Home Secretary of the government of British India succeeding Harry Graham Haig. In the role, Emerson had talks with Mahatma Gandhi over release of political prisoners after the civil disobedience movement. He and the Viceroy, Lord Irwin agreed for negotiation and resulted in Gandhi–Irwin Pact which conditioned the release but only of those who have not been accused of violent oppression. Due to this, three revolutionaries Bhagat Singh, Sukhdev & Rajguru, who had been accused for brutally murdering ASP of Lahore, John Saunders in late 1928, were hanged in the Central Jail of Lahore in the evening of 23 March 1931.

There was great public furore after their hanging. In many places protests and strikes took place against the British Government's unjust decision to hang them after an illegitimate trial where they were not even chanced to be defended. People even protested against Emerson to be just working on the orders of the Viceroy and not bearing any decisive powers.

=== Governor of Punjab ===
In 1933, he was appointed Governor of the Punjab and Sir Maurice Hallett took over as Home Secretary. The following year he took leave from the role and was deputised for four months by Sir Sikandar Hayat Khan. Emerson served as Governor until his retirement in April 1938.

== Other Home Secretaries before Emerson ==
Here is a probable list of Home Secretaries of the British Indian government who had served before Emerson —

- Sir Herbert Hope Risely — 1904–1910
- Sir William Sinclair Marris — 1913–1916
- Sir James Houssemayne Du Boulay — 1916–1919
- Sir Sidney Robert Hignell — 1919–1921
- Sir H. D. Craik — 1921–1926
- Sir Harry Graham Haig — 1926–1930

== Later life ==
On 23 September 1938, he became League of Nations' High Commissioner for Refugees, and later Director of the Inter-Governmental Committee on Refugees, dealing primarily with Russian and European Jewish refugees. He was an active writer, recording local customs and publicizing his opinions.

He died at the age of 80 on 13 April 1962 at the British capital London.

== Indian legacy ==
He was portrayed by a British actor Ryan Jonathan in the 2002 Bollywood film The Legend of Bhagat Singh. In the film, he had been wrongly portrayed as a Home Member of Viceroy's Executive Council while he had actually been a Home Secretary of the Government of India. In it, his appearance also differs from his real one as he is shown having a moustache while he actually did not have any. Sir Herbert is also portrayed in the film Jinnah (1998). He is shown as Governor of Punjab along with his deputy Sikandar Hayat meeting with Gandhi and Nehru. Sir Herbert played a key role in education in Punjab. Emerson College in Multan was established in 1920 in his honour. The college is now known as Emerson University.

== Literature ==
- Oxford Biography Index Number 101067177
