= Alan Cadell =

Alan Cadell, CSI (25 July 1841 – 14 June 1921) was a British administrator in India.

The son of John Cadell, he was educated at Edinburgh Academy, the University of Edinburgh and in Germany. He entered the Bengal Civil Service in 1862. During his career, he served as Commissioner of Agra and Rohilkund, as member of Board of Revenue and member of the Legislative Council of the North-Western Provinces. Cadell officiated as Lieutenant-Governor of the North-Western Provinces from January to November 1895 during the absence of Sir Charles Crosthwaite on leave. He was a temporary member of the Governor-General's Council from 1895 to 1897. He retired in 1897.

Cadell was appointed a CSI in 1895.
