= Neil B. Edmonstone =

British civil servant (1765–1841)

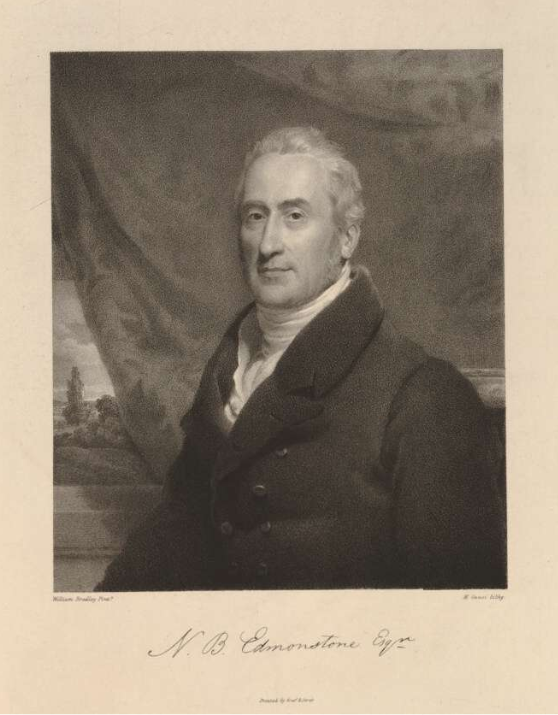
Neil B. Edmonstone

Neil Benjamin Edmonstone (1765–1841) was a civil servant in and director of the East India Company.

== Early life ==
Edmonstone, born on 6 December 1765, was fifth son of Sir Archibald Edmonstone of Duntreath, M.P. for Dumbartonshire 1761–80 and 1790–6, and the Ayr Burghs 1780–90, who, made a baronet in 1774, died in 1807. He obtained a writership in the East India Company's civil service, and reached India in 1783. He was soon attached to the secretariat at Calcutta, and was appointed deputy Persian translator to government by Lord Cornwallis in 1789, and Persian translator by Sir John Shore in 1794.

== Career ==
On the arrival of Lord Wellesley, in 1798, the new governor-general appointed Edmonstone to be his acting private secretary, and in that capacity he accompanied him to Madras in 1799. Lord Wellesley now determined to crush Tipu Sultan, and finally annihilate the power which the French officers were building up in India by taking service with Nizam Ali Khan and other native princes. Edmonstone was by his chief's side throughout this important year, and translated and published the documents found in Tippoo's palace, which formed the principal justification of the English attack upon him. That the whole policy of Lord Wellesley in making the company the paramount power in India by means of his system of subsidiary treaties was largely due to Edmonstone there can be no doubt, though he modestly kept in the background.

Sir John William Kaye speaks of him, in his Lives of Indian Officers, as "the ubiquitous Edmonstone, one of the most valuable officials and far-seeing statesmen which the Indian civil service has ever produced". On 1 January 1801 he was appointed secretary to the government of India in the secret, political, and foreign department, and he played as important a part in forming the plans which were to crush the Marathas as he had done in the war against Tippoo Sultan. He continued to hold his office after the departure of Lord Wellesley, and as Lord Cornwallis did not survive long enough to counteract the policy of that statesman, Edmonstone was able to carry on the system he had done so much to initiate during the interregnum after his death. When Lord Minto arrived as governor-general in 1807, Edmonstone acted as his private secretary, as in former days to Lord Wellesley, and soon obtained much the same influence over him.

== Later life ==
On 30 October 1809 he became Chief Secretary to Government, and on 30 October 1812 he succeeded his old friend and colleague James Lumsden as member of the Supreme Council at Calcutta. Having completed his five years in this appointment, he left India after thirty-four years' service there, and returned to England. He was soon after, in 1820, elected a director of the East India Company, and continued to act in this capacity until his death.

He was elected a Fellow of the Royal Society in 1826 as "an East India Director, and late Vice President of the Supreme Government of Bengal, (of 49 Portland Place) a Gentleman eminently versed in Oriental Literature and much attached to Science."

He died at his residence, 49 Portland Place, on 4 May 1841. He married the daughter of Peter Friell, by whom he had a family of five sons and six daughters, of whom the most distinguished was the fourth son, Sir George Frederick Edmonstone, who was Lord Canning's foreign secretary, and governor of the north-western provinces after the Sepoy Mutiny. The eldest son, Neil Benjamin (born 13 June 1809), was also in the East India Company's service. He also had an Indian family which he provided for and maintained quite separately from his European one.
