= David Davies (physician) =

Welsh physician (1792–1865)

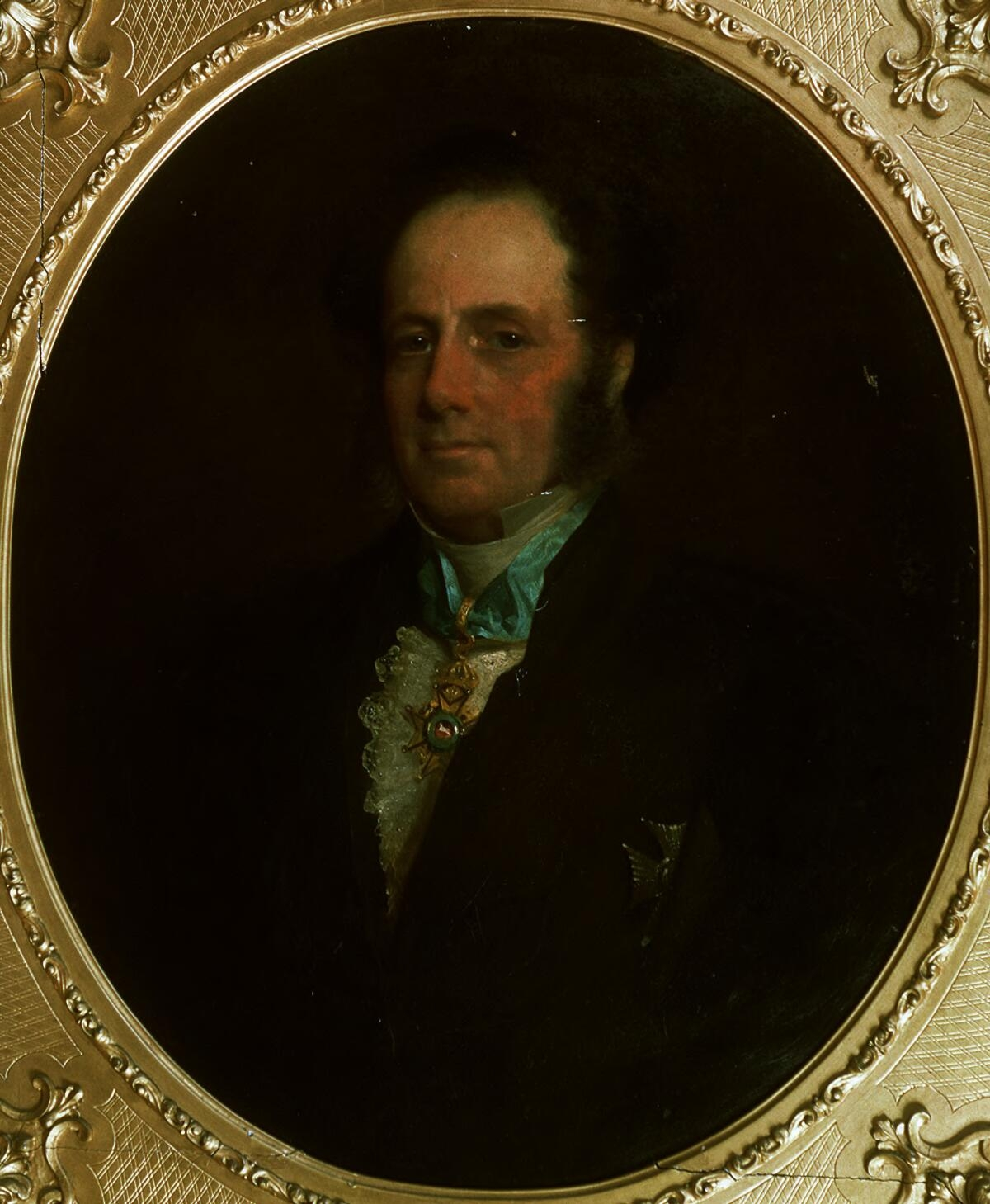
Sir David Davies (1792-1865)

Sir David Davies (1792 - 1865) was a Welsh physician and physician to King William IV and Queen Adelaide.

The son of Robert and Eleanor Davies of Llanddewi Brefi, Cardiganshire, he was christened at Llanddewi Brefi church, 5 September 1792.

Entering the medical profession whilst still quite a young man, he moved to London, and worked as an assistant to one of the physicians to Queen Adelaide. He was later appointed physician to King William IV and Adelaide.

He was made a member of the Royal College of Physicians in 1815, and was granted a Lambeth degree in Medicine in 1836.

Davies was knighted in 1837, shortly after Queen Victoria had ascended the throne. He remained physician to Queen Adelaide during her years of failing health and accompanied her to Madeira in the fall of 1847. While there, he also treated Prince Alexander of the Netherlands, at whose death in February 1848 he was present.

He died in Lucca, Italy in 1865, and was buried in Biarritz, France. His sons were William (a first-class cricketer) and Robert (a colonial official in British India).
