= Latouche Road, Kanpur =

Street in Kanpur, India

Latouche Road is a street in Kanpur, India, which is named after British Lieutenant Governor Sir James Latouche. The road was laid in the year 1900 during British Raj. The town hall of Kanpur was situated on this road during British Era which later shifted to Moti Jheel.

Latouche Road is an important retail centre. It has numerous shops which mainly deal with iron and steel accessories.
