= Charles Metcalfe, 1st Baron Metcalfe =

British colonial governor (1785–1846)

The Right Honourable The Lord Metcalfe GCB PC
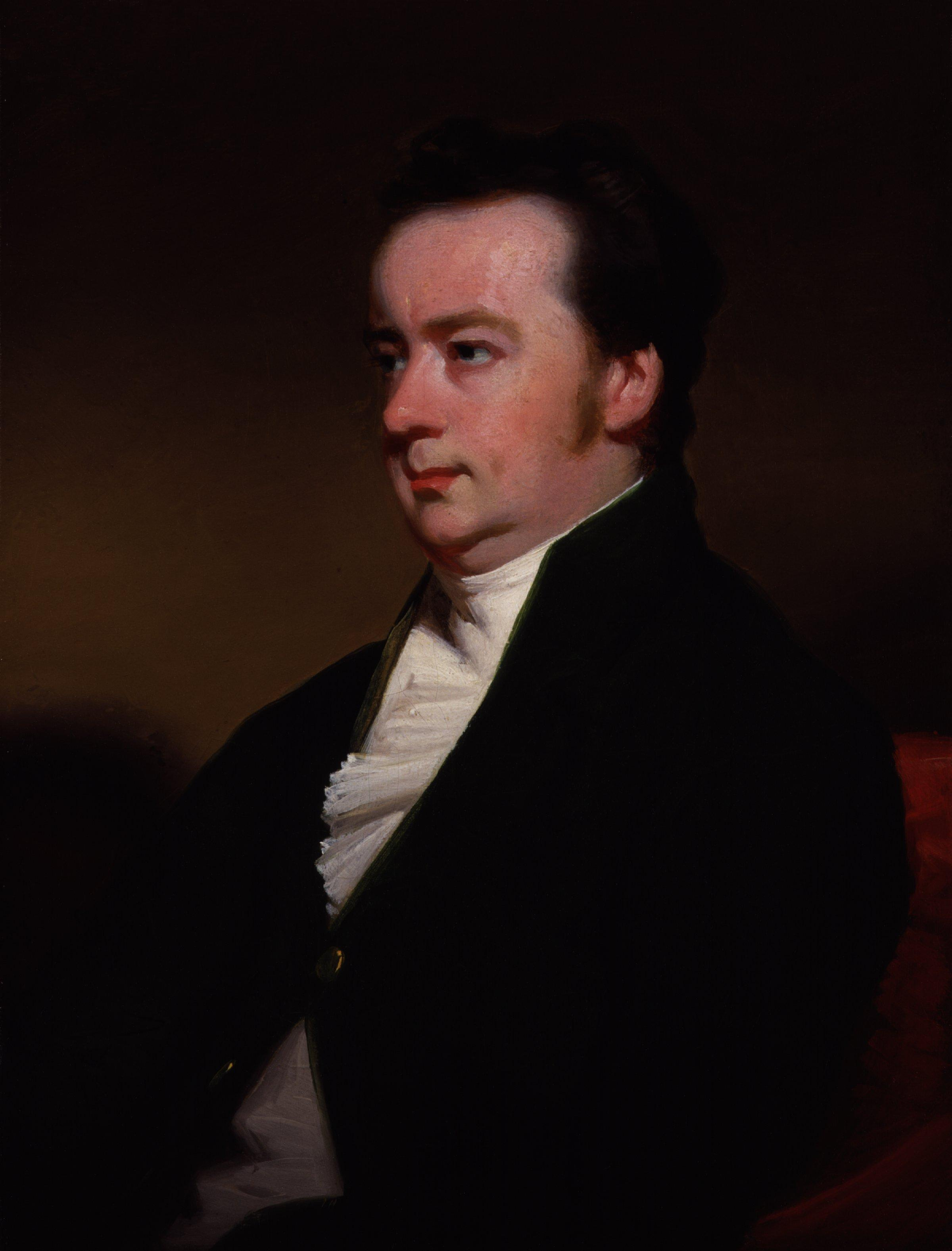
- Portrait by George Chinnery, early 1820s

Governor General of the Province of Canada
- In office 1843–1845
- Monarch: Victoria
- Preceded by: Sir Charles Bagot
- Succeeded by: The Earl Cathcart

Governor of Jamaica
- In office 1839–1842
- Monarch: Victoria
- Preceded by: Sir Lionel Smith, Bt
- Succeeded by: The Earl of Elgin

Lieutenant-Governor of the North-Western Provinces
- In office 1 June 1836 – 1 June 1838
- Governor General: The Lord Auckland
- Preceded by: Office created
- Succeeded by: Thomas Campbell Robertson

Governor-General of India Acting
- In office 20 March 1835 – 4 March 1836
- Monarch: William IV
- Preceded by: Lord William Bentinck
- Succeeded by: The Lord Auckland

Governor of Agra
- In office 14 November 1834 – 20 March 1835
- Governor General: Lord William Bentinck
- Preceded by: Office created
- Succeeded by: William Blunt

Personal details
- Born: 30 January 1785 Calcutta, Bengal Presidency
- Died: 5 September 1846 (aged 61) Malshanger, Oakley, Hampshire

Charles Theophilus Metcalfe, 1st Baron Metcalfe, GCB PC (30 January 1785 – 5 September 1846), known as Sir Charles Metcalfe, Bt between 1822 and 1845, was a British colonial administrator. He held appointments including acting Governor-General of India, Governor of Jamaica and Governor General of the Province of Canada.

== Early life and background ==
Metcalfe was born on 30 January 1785 in Lecture House, Calcutta then part of the Bengal Presidency.

He was the second son of Thomas Metcalfe and Susannah Selina Sophia Debonnaire. His father first went to India in 1767 as a cadet in the British Army, and at the time of Metcalfe's birth was serving as a major in the Bengal Army. He later became a Member of Parliament, director of the British East India Company and was created a baronet on 21 December 1802. Thomas Metcalfe married Susannah in Calcutta in 1782. She was the daughter of merchant John Debonnaire, a trader at Fort St. George, Madras, who subsequently settled at the Cape of Good Hope. It was her second marriage, her first being with Major John Smith in Madras from 1776 until his death. His parents returned to England shortly after the birth of their son.

Metcalfe's elder sister was Emily Theophila, later becoming the Viscountess Ashbrook. A younger brother, Thomas, also went on to achieve distinction as a civil servant with the East India Company.

== Education ==
Metcalfe spent four years at Eton College in Berkshire, before arriving in Bengal on 1 January 1801, a month before his sixteenth birthday. He then studied Oriental languages as the first student at Lord Wellesley's Fort William College.

== India ==
=== Early career ===
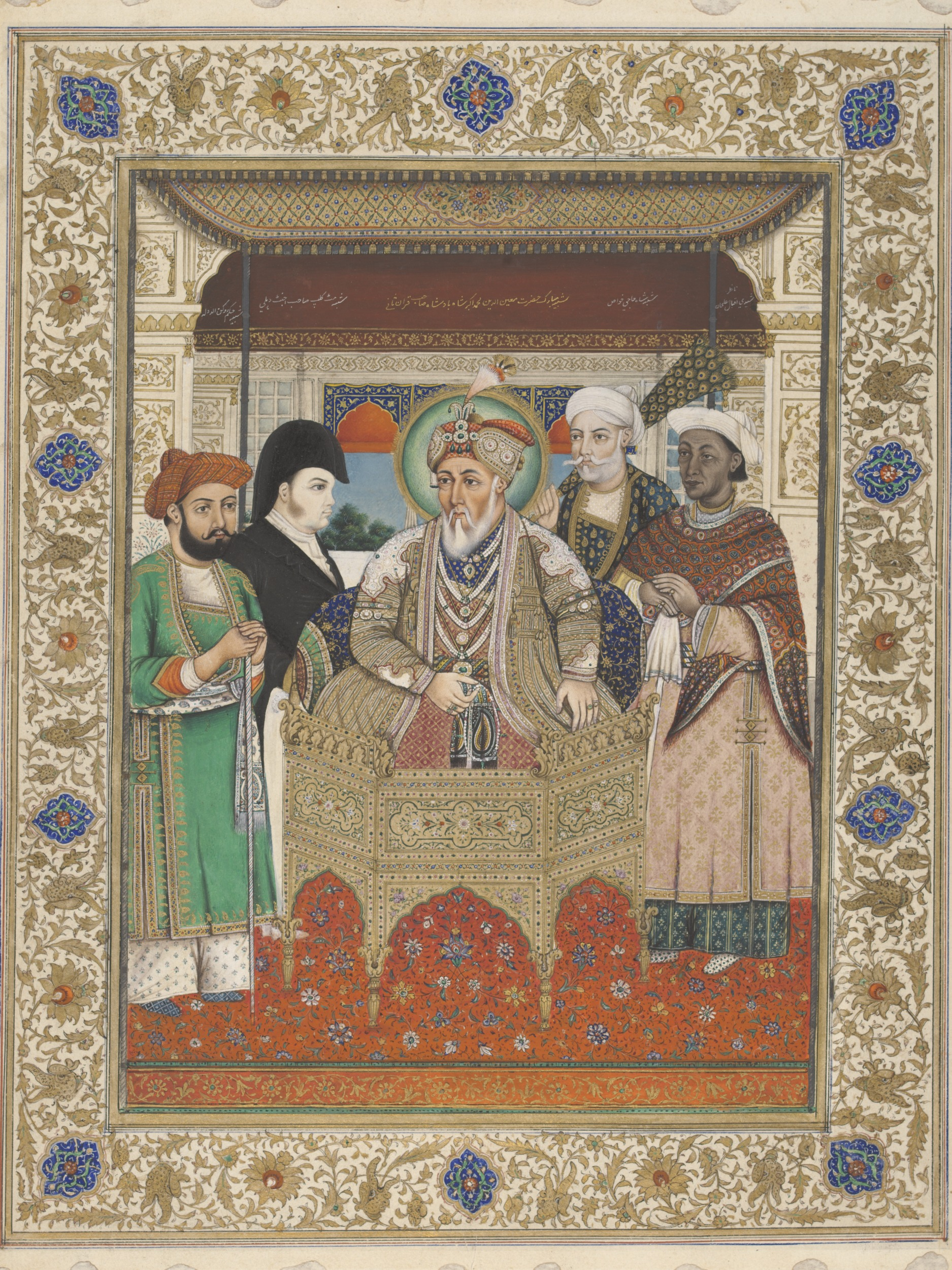
Portrait of Akbar II with Sir Charles Theophilus Metcalf [sic] and court dignitaries

At the age of nineteen, Metcalfe was appointed political assistant to General Lake, who was then conducting the final campaign of the Second Anglo-Maratha War against Yashwantrao Holkar.

In 1808 he was selected by Lord Minto for the responsible post of envoy to the court of Ranjit Singh at Lahore; here, on 25 April 1809, he concluded the important Treaty of Amritsar securing the independence of the Sikh states between the Sutlej and the Jumna.

His first tenure as Resident at Delhi began on 25 February 1811 for the East India Company (from 1813 for the British Government), and in 1819 he received from Lord Hastings the appointment of secretary in the secret and political department. From 1820 to 1825 Sir Charles (who succeeded his brother in the baronetcy in 1822) was resident at the court of the Nizam, and afterwards was summoned in an emergency to his former post at Delhi.

=== Agra ===
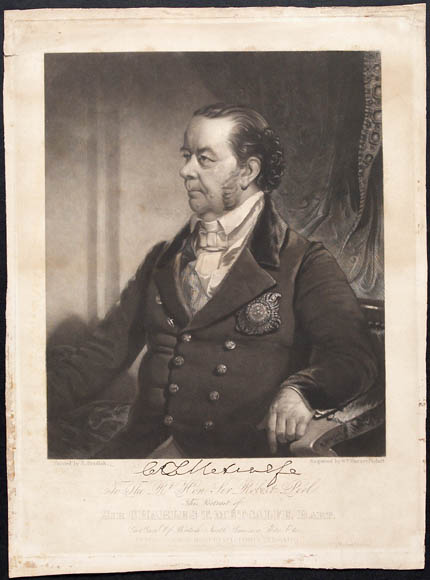
Baron Metcalfe, Charles Theophilus, 1846.

On 14 November 1834 Metcalfe was posted as Governor of the Presidency of Agra where he served for over four months till 20 March 1835.

=== Acting Governor-General ===
In 1827 he obtained a seat in the supreme council, and in March 1835, after he had acted as the first governor of the proposed new presidency of Agra, he provisionally succeeded Lord William Bentinck as the Governor-General of Bengal (1835–36). During his brief tenure of office (it lasted for only one year) he carried out several important measures, including that for the liberation of the press, which, while almost universally popular, complicated his relations with the directors at home to such an extent that he resigned the service of the Company in 1838. In 1835 he was also appointed a Knight Grand Cross of the Order of the Bath (GCB).

=== North-Western Provinces ===
Metcalfe was Lieutenant-Governor of the North-Western Provinces from 1 June 1836 to 1 June 1838. In 1838 he retired from service with the East India Company and settled in England.

== Jamaica ==
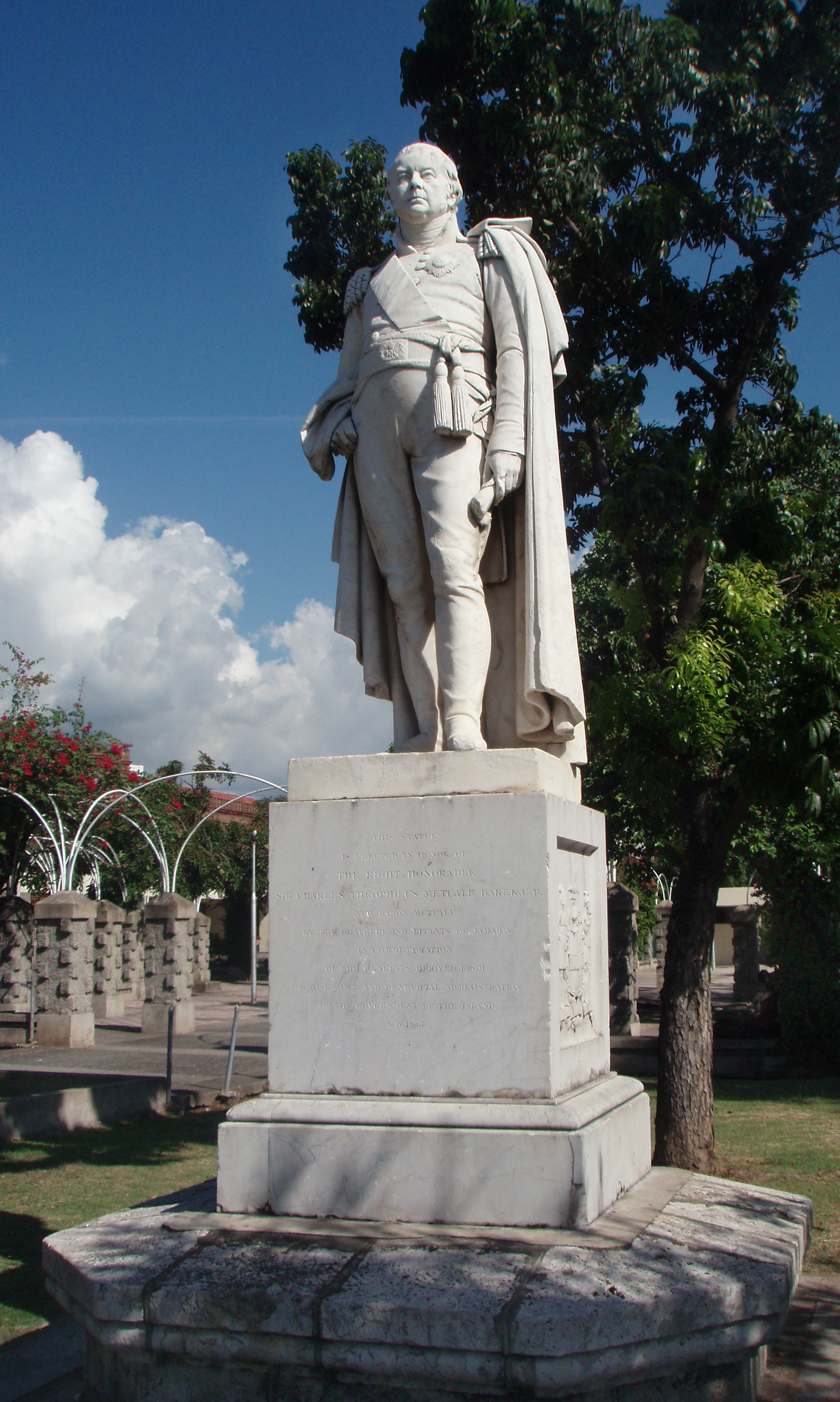
Monument of Charles Metcalfe in St. William Grant Park in Kingston, Jamaica

In 1839, Metcalfe accepted an appointment by the Second Melbourne ministry to the governorship of Jamaica, where labour difficulties created by the recent passing of the Slavery Abolition Act called for a high degree of tact and ability. Metcalfe's administration was successful in addressing the complaints of both labourers and their employers and bringing a greater sense of unity amongst the different factions. Ill health hastened his resignation and on 24 May 1842 he left Jamaica for England.

== Canada ==
Six months afterwards he was appointed by the Peel ministry to the post of Governor General of the Province of Canada with instructions to resist further development of responsible government. A clash soon emerged between Metcalfe and the leaders of the legislative assembly, Robert Baldwin and Louis-Hippolyte Lafontaine. Despite suffering from worsening cancer, he fought to preserve the prerogatives of the Crown and the governor's control over the administration and patronage. He nonetheless had to make some concessions to win support, and the most notable of these was persuading the Colonial Office to grant amnesty to the rebels of 1837-38, and to abandon forced anglicization of the French-speaking population.

== Final years ==
Metcalfe's success in Canada carrying out the policy of the home government was rewarded with a peerage shortly after his return to England, with the title Baron Metcalfe, of Fern Hill in the County of Berkshire in 1845. But his success did not endure and responsible government would be conceded by his successor James Bruce, 8th Earl of Elgin. Metcalfe died of skin cancer at Malshanger in Oakley, near Basingstoke, on 5 September 1846. His residence was however at Fernhill Park in Winkfield, near Windsor and it was in the parish church there that he was buried.

== Personal life ==
When in Lahore, Metcalfe began a relationship with a Punjabi Sikh woman who bore him three sons. Metcalfe was open about this relationship, and sent all three sons to England to be educated. One of his sons, James Metcalfe, became a Lieutenant-Colonel in the Bengal Army.

== Honorific eponyms ==
- Ontario: Metcalfe
- (Victoria (state)) Victoria: Metcalfe

Government offices
New creation	Governor of Agra; 1834–1835	Succeeded by W. Blunt
Preceded by Lord William Bentinck	Governor-General of India, acting 1835–1836	Succeeded by The Lord Auckland
Preceded by A. Ross as Governor of Agra	Lieutenant Governor of the North-Western Provinces; 1836–1838	Vacant Title next held by Sir George Frederick Edmonstone
Preceded by Sir Lionel Smith	Governor of Jamaica; 1839–1842	Succeeded by The Earl of Elgin and Kincardine
Preceded by Sir Charles Bagot	Governor General of the Province of Canada; 1843–1845	Succeeded by The Earl Cathcart
Academic offices
Preceded by Sir Charles Bagot	Chancellor of King's College; 1843–1845	Succeeded by The Earl Cathcart
Baronetage of the United Kingdom
Preceded by Theophilus John Metcalfe	Baronet (of Chilton); 1822–1846	Succeeded by Thomas Theophilus Metcalfe
Peerage of the United Kingdom
New creation	Baron Metcalfe; 1845–1846	Extinct
