= Edmund Drummond =

British colonial officer (1814–1895)

Edmund Drummond (17 January 1814 – 10 January 1895) was a British civil servant in India.

He was the third son of James Drummond, 6th Viscount Strathallan (de jure 8th Viscount) and the brother of William Drummond, 7th Viscount Strathallan.

He was educated at Magdalene College, Cambridge. He studied law at the Middle Temple and was called to the bar in 1848.

From 7 March 1863 to 10 March 1868 he held position of Lieutenant-Governor of the North-Western Provinces. In 1875, he became a member of the Council of India

His son Edmund Charles Drummond was an admiral.

Government offices
Preceded by R. Money (acting)	Lieutenant Governor of the North-Western Provinces; 27 February 1863 – 7 March 1868	Succeeded by Sir William Muir
