= Harry Graham Haig =

Sir Harry Graham Haig KCSI, CIE

Governor of the United Provinces
- In office 6 December 1934 – 9 March 1939

Home Secretary to the Government of British India
- In office April 1926 – April 1930
- Preceded by: Sir H. D. Craik
- Succeeded by: Sir H. W. Emerson

Personal details
- Born: 13 April 1881 43 Kensington Gardens, Kensington, London, W.
- Died: 14 June 1956 (aged 75) Valelands, Oxted, Surrey, United Kingdom
- Spouse: Violet May
- Relations: Eyre Chatterton
- Education: New College, Oxford
- Profession: Civil servant

Sir Harry Graham Haig KCSI CIE JP ICS (13 April 1881 – 14 June 1956) was a British administrator in India.

Haig was an opponent of Mohandas Gandhi's campaign for Indian independence, describing it as a "menace". "We can do without the goodwill of Congress and in fact I do not believe for a moment that we shall ever have it, but we cannot afford to do without confidence of those who have supported us in the long struggle against the Congress." Haig remained a staunch critic of the Mahatma's policy of attacking British rule while at the same time negotiating with the government. In his position as Home Member on the Council he was responsible for overseeing Civil Martial Law. On 5 December 1934 he succeeded the Labour supporter, Sir Malcolm Hailey at Allahabad as the new governor of United Provinces. They feared a reaction against Swaraj Party's success at the polls would spark rioting and violence against landlords.

== Family ==
Harry was born at 43 Kensington Gardens, Kensington, London to Henry Alexander Haig, a city merchant, and his wife Agnes Catherine Pollock. His family were wealthy upper-middle class that originated in trade from Scotland. Harry was educated at Winchester College. He won a scholarship to go up to New College, Oxford in 1900. Two years later he took a second in Mods (classical moderations) and after four years at Oxford he achieved a first in Literae humaniores. That autumn 1904 he was third place in the national examinations for the Indian Civil Service (ICS). He was appointed to the officer cadre of United Provinces (now Uttar Pradesh) then considered the most senior civil service province in British India. He returned to England, but on 25 August 1908 he married Violet May, daughter of Joseph Deas of the Indian Civil Service. In 1910 he was appointed to be an Under-secretary to the government of United Provinces, yet only for two years.

== Career ==
Haig liked India, and so resolved to remain there during World War One. He joined the Indian Army Reserves Corps of officers. In 1920 he resumed a civil service career in finance. Appointed a deputy secretary in the department of the Government of India. Now at the heart of Indian power, he was soon promoted to be Secretary to the Fiscal Commission, where he had a knowledge and understanding of taxation. The government in London was attempting to make savings by imposing more of the financial burden upon India for its own service upkeep. In 1923 he was attached to the Royal Commission on superior civil services. Two years later he became private secretary to the new Liberal Viceroy, the Marquess of Reading. In 1926 he was appointed secretary of the home department in India. His record of service, fifteen years at the top of the Indian service was only equalled by Sir Malcolm Hailey. Haig became expert in policing and home affairs. He was resolved to prevent Gandhi's non-cooperation movement from breaking up British rule, and yet knew how alarmist tactics could ignite an orgy of violence. Recommending a new Intelligence-led police operation to track rebels, Gandhi made a personal plea to end the Criminal Investigation Department (CID) feared for its rigorous methods of arrest and detention. By 1933 the civil disobedience movement had calmed down, its leaders in prison or disarmed. Gandhi was sentenced to six years in prison. In 1929 Haig was instrumental in the defeat of the Communist-inspired Meerut Conspiracy Case, in which violent revolutionaries aimed to disrupt Congress peaceful demonstrations, yet they were far from that, as Haig found out from the Nainital proceedings in his capacity as Secretary to the government.

Leaving the British India leaders to cajole Gandhi into attending the Second Round Table Conference in London. Haig attended both conferences in 1930–31. he was in the chair of the committee that expanded the jurisdiction of the North-West Frontier Province with full governor and provincial legislature powers. Emergency powers were in full operation throughout India invoking martial law in a region where many Muslims and Sikhs joined the British Indian Army. When Sir James Crerar retired in 1932 he was asked to become home member on Lord Willingdon's Council and appointed Commander of the Order of the Indian Empire. Haig encouraged the London drafters of Government of India bill in 1934 to make special constituency reserved seats in the North-West for Muslims and the other minorities that predominated in the province. He recognised the security and safety issues by pursuance of a dual policy during the negotiations with Gandhi-Dr. Ambedkar.

At once the home department deployed a tough policy of detention against the Congress while being on the telegraph hotline to London in conversation with the cabinet. Gandhi was an old man incapable of defeating the British forces, so they were happy for the policy to be to decline his position. Gandhi would later praise Haig's "rearguard action" which was conducted with firmness but fairness. Britain pursued a managed withdrawal from the 1930s onwards, offering concessions for "responsive government" within the Imperial federation. Haig had long worked with Hailey, becoming well acquainted with the United Provinces; he succeeded a mentor as governor at Allahabad on 6 December 1934. The Government of India Act 1935 was bitterly opposed by Conservatives, and Haig was fearful that Indians would become uncontrollable. In 1937 Congress won a landslide election victory. G B Pant was appointed president but resigned when the new Viceroy, Lord Linlithgow, a less tolerant aristocrat refused. on the home member's advice, to release the last of the political prisoners. Haig remained courteous and was thanked by the Congress, but it could be the end of his career in India. Chatari tried to form his own government, but failed when even his own brother refused a post in the new cabinet. In October 1939, war already declared police arrested a gang of Khaksars. They were taken to Bulandshahr district jail where five were shot dead and twenty wounded. The British security were on red alert during wartime, but Justice Hunter of Allahabad was appointed to investigate. Haig was sanguine about the situation in a secret report to the Viceroy Lord Linlithgow, that is said to vindicate surrender of arms.

When war broke out in Europe he returned to England. In 1940 he was appointed Regional Commissioner for Civil Defence in Manchester. Haig was an Anglican, and regularly attended church. He was appointed Chairman of the Indian Church Aid Association under the diocesan control of his brother-in-law, Bishop Eyre Chatterton. He became an active member of the Royal Institute of International Affairs in London. In 1952 he was invited to the silver jubilee of Agra University in the province he once governed. Sir Harry died at home, Valelands, Oxted, Surrey.

== Bibliography ==
- D.A. Low, Britain and Indian nationalism: the imprint of ambiguity 1929-1942 (1997)
- D.A. Low, Congress and the raj: facets of the Indian struggle, 1917-1947 (1977) chap.4
- J.B. Wainewright, Winchester College 1836-1906: a register (1907)
- Peter D Reeves, The Landlord's Response to Political Change in the United Provinces of Agra & Oudh, India, Australian National University, 1963.
