= List of chief commissioners of Oudh =

This is a list of chief commissioners of Oudh. The establishment of the title of Chief Commissioner of Oudh was created after deposing Nawab of Awadh Wajid Ali Shah and incorporating Oudh into British India by Company in 1856 until it was merged with the title of Lieutenant Governor of the North-Western Provinces and renamed as Lieutenant Governor of the United Provinces of Agra and Oudh in 1877.

== Chief commissioners of Oudh (1856–1877) ==
In 1856, the office was created.

#	Name	Took office	Left office	Remarks
1	Major General Sir James Outram	1 February 1856	8 May 1856	–
2	Colville Coverly Jackson	8 May 1856	21 March 1857	Officiating
3	Major General Sir Henry Montgomery Lawrence	21 March 1857	5 July 1857	Killed at Lucknow, July, 1857
4	Major John Sherbroke Banks	5 July 1857	11 September 1857	Killed at Lucknow, July, 1857
5	Lieut General Sir James Outram	11 September 1857	3 April 1858	–
6	Robert Montgomery	3 April 1858	15 February 1859	–
7	Charles John Wingfield	15 February 1859	20 April 1860	–
8	Lieutenant Colonel Lousada Barrow	20 April 1860	4 April 1861	Officiating
9	George Udny Yule	4 April 1861	26 August 1865	Officiating
10	Robert Henry Davies	26 August 1865	17 March 1866	Officiating
11	John Strachey	17 March 1866	24 May 1868	–
12	Robert Henry Davies	24 May 1868	18 January 1871	Officiating, Confirmed 9 March 1868
13	Major General Lousada Barrow	18 January 1871	20 April 1871	–
14	Sir George Couper	20 April 1871	15 March 1875	Officiating, Confirmed 9 December 1873
15	John Forbes David Inglis	15 March 1875	15 February 1877	Officiating, until 15 November 1875 and from 26 July 1876 to 15 February 1877

== See also ==
- (1732–1857) – Nawabs of Awadh
- (1834–1836) – Governors of Agra
- (1836–1877) – Lieutenant Governors of the North-Western Provinces
- (1877–1902) – Lieutenant Governors of the North-Western Provinces and Chief Commissioners of Oudh
- (1902–1921) – Lieutenant Governors of the United Provinces of Agra and Oudh
- (1921–1937) – Governors of the United Provinces of Agra and Oudh
- (1937–1950) – Governors of the United Provinces
- (1950 – cont.) – Governors of Uttar Pradesh
