= List of governors of the United Provinces =

This is a list of governors of the United Provinces and the precursor offices associated with that title from the provisional establishment of the Governor of Agra in 1833 until the province was renamed as Uttar Pradesh when India became officially a republic in 1950.

== Governors of the United Provinces under British India (1937–1947) ==
- Sir Harry Graham Haig, 1 April 1937 – 7 December 1939, continued
  - Nawab of Chhatari, acting Governor, April to November 1937
- Sir Maurice Garnier Hallett, 7 December 1939 – 7 December 1945
- Sir Francis Verner Wylie, 7 December 1945 – 14 August 1947

== Governors of the United Provinces under the Union of India (1947-1950) ==
On 15 August 1947 India achieved independence from the United Kingdom.

- Sarojini Naidu, 15 August 1947 – 2 March 1949
- Bidhu Bhushan Malik, 3 March 1949 – 1 May 1949 (acting)
- Hormasji Peroshaw Mody, 2 May 1949 – 25 January 1950

The province was renamed Uttar Pradesh on 26 January 1950, headed by the Governor of Uttar Pradesh.

== See also ==
- (1732–1857) - Nawabs of Awadh
- (1834–1836) - Governors of Agra
- (1836–1877) - Lieutenant Governors of the North-Western Provinces
- (1856–1877) - Chief Commissioners of Oudh
- (1877–1902) - Lieutenant Governors of the North-Western Provinces and Chief Commissioners of Oudh
- (1902–1921) - Lieutenant-Governors of the United Provinces of Agra and Oudh
- (1921–1937) - Governors of the United Provinces of Agra and Oudh
- (1937–1950) - Governors of the United Provinces
- (1950 – cont.) - Governors of Uttar Pradesh
