= Edmund Drummond (Royal Navy officer) =

Royal Navy Admiral (1841–1911)

Admiral Edward Drummond
- Born: 4 August 1841
- Died: 6 May 1911 (aged 69)
- Military career
- Allegiance: United Kingdom
- Branch: Royal Navy
- Service years: 1855–1904
- Rank: Admiral
- Commands: HMS Tenedos; East Indies Station

Admiral Edmund Charles Drummond (4 August 1841 – 6 May 1911) was a Royal Navy officer who went on to be Commander-in-Chief, East Indies Station.

== Naval career ==
Born the son of Edmund Drummond, a career civil servant in British India, Drummond joined the Royal Navy in 1855. In 1867 he served as Flag Lieutenant to Admiral Sir Hastings Yelverton. Promoted to captain in 1877, he took command of HMS Tenedos in 1884. Then, promoted to rear admiral on 26 March 1892, he was made Commander-in-Chief, East Indies Station in 1895, serving until March 1898. He was promoted to vice admiral on 21 December 1898, to full admiral on 1 October 1903, and retired at his own request on 26 November 1904.

He lived at Halesworth in Suffolk.

== Family ==
In 1872 he married Dora Naylor; they had one son and one daughter.

Military offices
Preceded by Sir William Kennedy	Commander-in-Chief, East Indies Station; 1895–1898	Succeeded by Sir Archibald Douglas
