= Agra Presidency =

Region of British India (1834–1836)

Presidency of Agra
- Presidency of British Empire in India
- 14 November 1834–1 June 1836
- Capital: Agra
- Area
  - 1835 (?): 9,479 km^{2} (3,660 sq mi)
- Population
  - 1835 (?): 4,500,000
- History
  - Established: 14 November 1834
  - Disestablished: 1 June 1836
Preceded by	Succeeded by
Ceded and Conquered Provinces	North-Western Provinces
- Today part of: Portions in Uttar Pradesh; Uttarakhand; Rajasthan; Madhya Pradesh; Himachal Pradesh; Haryana; Delhi

Agra Presidency was constituted as one of the four presidencies of British India (the other three being Bengal, Bombay, and Madras) and was among the eight separate administrative divisions into which India was divided in the first half of the 19th century. It had an area of 9,479 mi^{2} (24,550 km^{2}) and a population of about 4,500,000.

Agra Presidency was established on 14 November 1834 under the provisions of the Government of India Act 1833 (3 & 4 Will. 4. c. 85) by elevating and renaming the Ceded and Conquered Provinces. Sir C. T. Metcalfe was appointed as the new Governor for the Presidency. However, in 1835 another act of Parliament, the India (North-West Provinces) Act 1835 (5 & 6 Will. 4. c. 52) renamed the region to the North-Western Provinces, this time to be administered by a Lieutenant-Governor. Agra Presidency ceased to exist on 1 June 1836.
