= List of lieutenant governors of the North-Western Provinces =

This is a list of lieutenant-governors of the North-Western Provinces. The provisional establishment of the Lieutenant-Governor of the North-Western Provinces happened in 1836 until the title was merged with Chief Commissioner of Oudh and was renamed as Lieutenant-Governor of the North-Western Provinces and Chief Commissioner of Oudh in 1877.

== Lieutenant-governors of the North-Western Provinces of the Presidency of Fort William in Bengal (1835–1878) ==
The Government of India Act 1833 had intended that there be four presidencies comprising India – that of Fort William in Bengal, Bombay, Madras and Agra. The new Presidency of Agra was being created from the Ceded and Conquered Provinces of the Bengal Presidency. However the presidency was never fully created. Instead a new act of Parliament in 1835, dissolved the new presidency and established the lieutenant-governorship of North-Western Provinces within the Bengal Presidency. The lieutenant governorship was finally separated from the Bengal Presidency in 1878 and merged with the Oudh Province which had been a Chief Commissioner's Province under the direct supervision of the Indian Government till then and the office of the Lieutenant-Governor of the North-Western Provinces of the Presidency of Fort William in Bengal was abolished.

No.	Name	Portrait	Took office	Left office	Appointer (Governor-General of India)
1	Sir C. T. Metcalfe		1 June 1836	1 June 1838	The Earl of Auckland
2	T. C. Robertson		4 February 1840	31 December 1842	The Earl of Auckland
3	Sir G. R. Clerk		30 June 1843	22 December 1843	The Lord Ellenborough
4	James Thomason		22 December 1843	10 October 1853	The Lord Ellenborough
5	J. R. Colvin		7 November 1853	9 September 1857	The Earl of Dalhousie
6	Colonel H. Fraser		30 September 1857	9 February 1858	The Viscount Canning
7	Sir G. F. Edmonstone		19 January 1859	27 February 1863	The Viscount Canning
8	The Hon. Edmund Drummond		7 March 1863	10 March 1868	The Earl of Elgin
9	Sir William Muir		10 March 1868	7 April 1874	Sir John Lawrence
10	Sir John Strachey		7 April 1874	26 July 1876	The Lord Northbrook
11	Sir G. E. W. Couper		26 July 1876	15 February 1877	The Lord Lytton

Graphical Timeline

== See also ==
- (1732–1857) – Nawab of Awadh
- (1834–1836) – Governors of Agra Presidency
- (1856–1877) – Chief Commissioners of Oudh
- (1877–1902) – Lieutenant Governors of the North-Western Provinces and Chief Commissioners of Oudh
- (1902–1921) – Lieutenant Governors of the United Provinces of Agra and Oudh
- (1921–1937) – Governors of the United Provinces of Agra and Oudh
- (1937–1950) – Governors of the United Provinces
- (1950–cont.) – Governors of Uttar Pradesh
