= Lousada Barrow =

British Army officer (1816–1877)

Major General Lousada Barrow C.B. (22 February 1816 – 1 October 1877) was the Chief Commissioner of Oudh for two terms. The first term was between 20 April 1860 and 4 April 1861 when he was a lieutenant colonel. His second term was between 18 January 1871 and 20 April 1871.

== Military ==
Barrow served in the Southern Mahratta country in 1844–45. He commanded a squadron of Volunteer Cavalry raised under the orders of Major-General Henry Havelock on 25 June 1857. His correspondence with Lieutenant colonel H. Bruce is available at The National Archives and held by the British Library.

He was present and commanded them at the Battle of Futtehpore on 12 July 1857.

== Death ==
His obituary can be found in the 13 October 1877 issue of Army and Navy Gazette and the Isle of Wight Observer. He is buried at Ryde Old Cemetery on the Isle of Wight.
