= North-Western Provinces =

Administrative region of British India (1836–1902)

Coordinates: 25.45°N 81.85°E

- Province of India under Company rule (1836–1858); India under the British Raj (1858–1902)
- 1836–1902
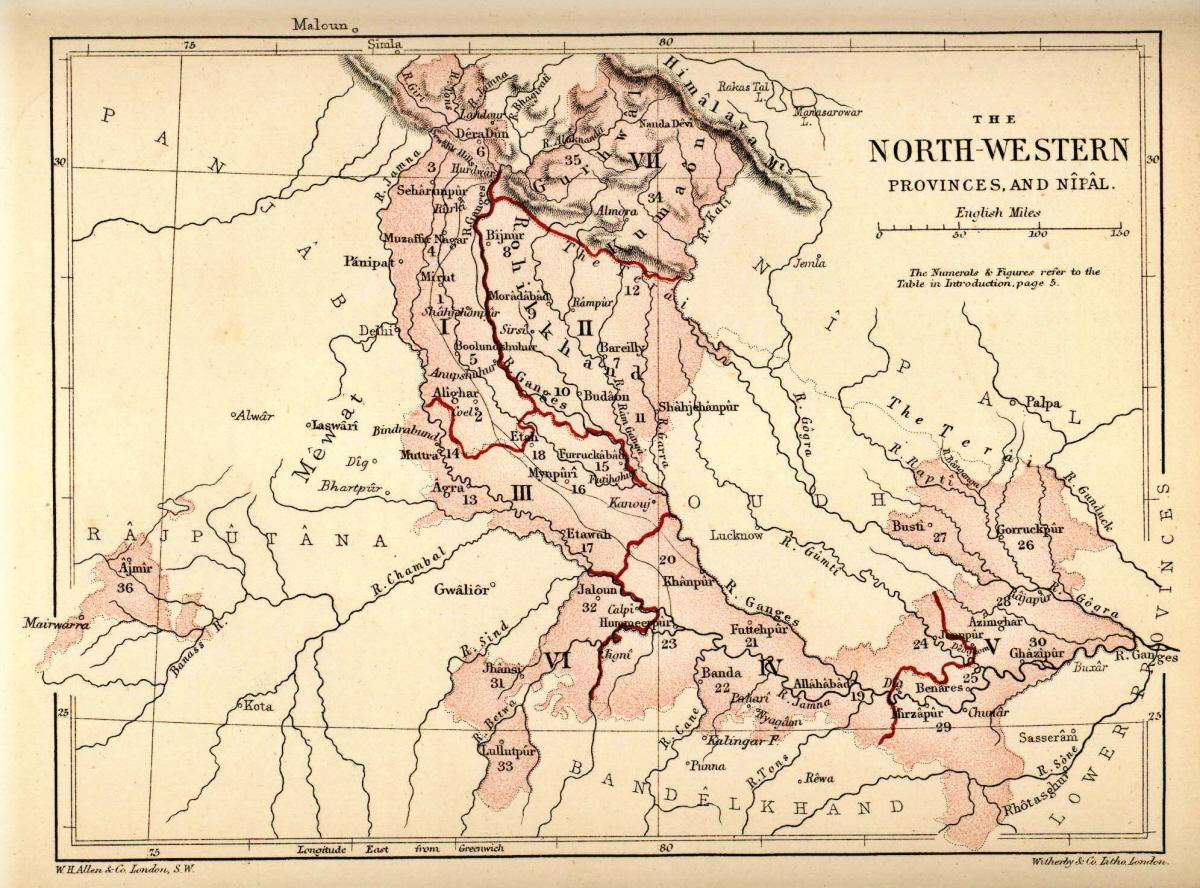
- North-Western Provinces, constituted in 1836 from erstwhile Presidency of Agra
- Capital: Agra (1836–1858), Allahabad (1858–1902)
- Area
  - 1835: 9,479 km^{2} (3,660 sq mi)
- Population
  - 1835: 4,500,000
- History
  - Established: 1836
  - Delhi Territory transferred from N.W. Provinces to Punjab: 1858
  - Saugor and Nerbudda Territories separated from N.W. Provinces: 1861
  - Ajmer separated from N.W. Provinces: 1871
  - The offices of Lieutenant-Governor of the North-Western Provinces and Chief Commissioner of Oudh were combined in the same person: 1877
  - Disestablished: 1902
Preceded by	Succeeded by
Agra Presidency; Oudh State	United Provinces of Agra and Oudh
- Today part of: India

India (North-West Provinces) Act 1835 (Note: The citation of this act by this short title was authorised by section 1 of, and the first schedule to, the Short Titles Act 1896. Due to the repeal of those provisions it is now authorised by section 19(2) of the Interpretation Act 1978.)
- Act of Parliament
- Parliament of the United Kingdom
- Long title: An Act to authorise the Court of Directors of the East India Company to suspend the Execution of the Provisions of the Act of the Third and Fourth William the Fourth, Chapter Eighty-five, so far as they relate to the Creation of the Government of Agra.
- Citation: 5 & 6 Will. 4. c. 52
- Territorial extent: United Kingdom

Dates
- Royal assent: 31 August 1835
- Commencement: 31 August 1835 (Note: The Acts of Parliament (Commencement) Act 1793.)
- Repealed: 1 January 1916
Other legislation
Amends	Government of India Act 1833
Amended by	Statute Law Revision Act 1890
Repealed by	Government of India Act 1915

Status: Repealed

Text of statute as originally enacted

The North-Western Provinces (NWP) was an administrative region in British India. The North-Western Provinces were established in 1836, through merging the administrative divisions of the Ceded and Conquered Provinces. In 1858, the Nawab-ruled kingdom of Oudh was annexed and merged with the North-Western Provinces to form the renamed North-Western Provinces and Oudh (NWP&O). In 1902, this province was reorganized to form the United Provinces of Agra and Oudh. Allahabad served as its capital from 1858, when it also became the capital of India for a day.

== Area ==
The province included Uttrakhand, and, all divisions of the present-day state of Uttar Pradesh with the exception of the Lucknow Division and Faizabad Division of Awadh. Among other regions included at various times were: the Delhi Territory, from 1836 until 1858, when the latter became part of the Punjab Province of British India; Ajmer and Merwara, from 1832 and 1846, respectively, until 1871, when Ajmer-Merwara became a minor province of British India; and the Saugor and Nerbudda Territories from 1853 until 1861, when they were absorbed into the Central Provinces.

== Administration ==
The North Western Provinces was governed by a Lieutenant-Governor, who was appointed by the East India Company from 1836 to 1858, and by the British Government from 1858 to 1902.

In 1856, after the annexation of Oudh State, the North Western Provinces became part of the larger province of North Western Provinces and Oudh. In 1902, the latter province was renamed the United Provinces of Agra and Oudh; in 1904, the region within the new United Provinces corresponding to the North Western Provinces was renamed the Agra Province.

== See also ==
- List of chief commissioners of Oudh
- List of lieutenant-governors of the North-Western Provinces
- List of lieutenant-governors of the North-Western Provinces and chief commissioners of Oudh
- Company rule in India
- British Raj
- United Provinces of Agra and Oudh
- Northwest India (pre-1947)

A map showing the new province of North-Western Provinces and Oudh in 1857

== Bibliography ==
- Administration of the North-Western Provinces and Oudh, April 1882 – November 1887, Allahabad: Government Press, North-Western Provinces and Oudh, 1887
- Bayly, C. A. (1988), Rulers, Townsmen and Bazaars: North Indian Society in the Age of British Expansion, 1770–1870, Cambridge University Press Archive, ISBN 978-0-521-31054-3
- Government of India. Legislative Dept (1892), The N.-W. provinces and Oudh code: consisting of the Bengal regulations and the local acts of the Governor General in council in force in the North-Western provinces and Oudh, the acts of the Lieutenant-Governor of the North-Western provinces and Oudh in council, the regulation made under 33 Vict., Cap. 3 for the Tarai, and lists of the enactments which have been scheduled in force in, or extended to, the scheduled districts of the North-Western provinces by notification under the scheduled districts act, 1874; with a chronological table and an index, Calcutta: Office of the Superintendent of Government Printing, India
- Imperial Gazetteer of India vol. V (1908), Abāzai to Arcot ("Agra Province" pp. 71–72), Published under the authority of His Majesty's Secretary of State for India in Council, Oxford at the Clarendon Press. Pp. viii, 1 map, 437.
- Imperial Gazetteer of India vol. XXIV (1908), Travancore to Zīra ("United Provinces" pp. 132–276), Published under the authority of His Majesty's Secretary of State for India in Council, Oxford at the Clarendon Press. Pp. vi, 1 map, 437.
