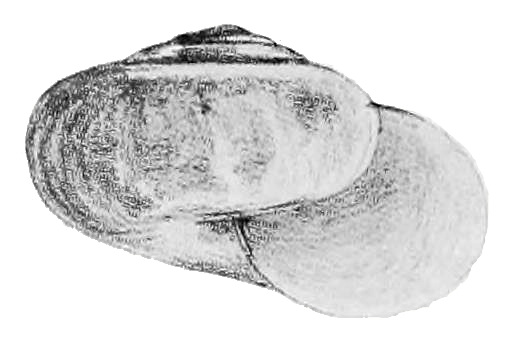
- drawing of apertural view of the shell of Staffordia toruputuensis

Scientific classification
- Domain: Eukaryota
- Kingdom: Animalia
- Phylum: Mollusca
- Class: Gastropoda
- Order: Stylommatophora
- Family: Staffordiidae
- Genus: Staffordia
- Species: S. toruputuensis

Binomial name
- Staffordia toruputuensis Godwin-Austen

= Staffordia toruputuensis =

Species of gastropod

Staffordia toruputuensis is a species of air-breathing land snail, terrestrial pulmonate gastropod mollusk in the family Staffordiidae.

The specific name toruputuensis is apparently according to its type locality, Toruputu Peak.

== Distribution ==
The type locality of this species is "Toruputu Peak". The altitude was not specified, but it can vary from 1750 m (birdwatching of the same author) to 7,000 feet (2,100 m) (locality of related species Staffordia staffordi). It is in Dafla Hills in India, because whole family Staffordiidae is endemic to Dafla Hills.

== Description ==
The shell is globose with oblique columellar margin. The shell of the type specimen is not fully grown. The sculpture is very smooth, with a thick shining epidermis with indistinct striation. The color is light ochraceous olive-green.

The width of the shell is 14.0-16.5 mm. The height of the shell is 7.25 mm.
