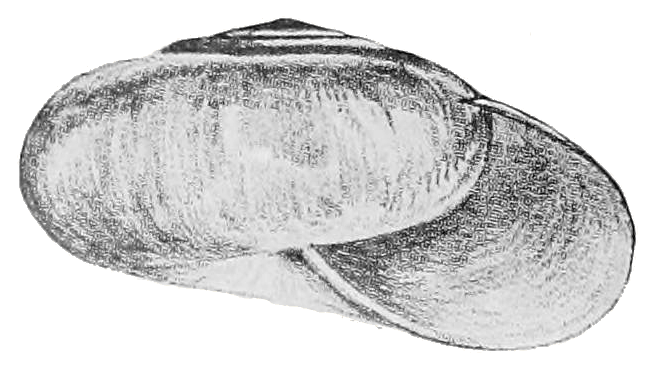
- drawing of apertural view of the shell of Staffordia daflaensis

Scientific classification
- Domain: Eukaryota
- Kingdom: Animalia
- Phylum: Mollusca
- Class: Gastropoda
- Order: Stylommatophora
- Family: Staffordiidae
- Genus: Staffordia
- Species: S. daflaensis

Binomial name
- Staffordia daflaensis (Godwin-Austen, 1???)

= Staffordia daflaensis =

Species of gastropod

Staffordia daflaensis is a species of air-breathing land snail, terrestrial pulmonate gastropod mollusk in the family Staffordiidae.

The specific name daflaensis is apparently according to its area of distribution, Dafla Hills in India.

== Distribution ==
The type locality of this species is "Shengorh Peak", 7,000 feet (2,100 m), Dafla Hills in India.

Godwin-Austen (1907) have found this species very abundant in Dafla Hills.

== Description ==
The shell is depressedly tumidly conoid, umbilicated, solid, rather flat on base. The sculpture is very regular, longitudinal, sharply defined, broad-ridged ribbing. Color is rich olivaceous with ochre tint. It vary in colour and size, often being of a pale ochraceous-grey tint. The spire is low, sides convex. The suture is shallow, adpressed. The shell has 6 whorls, that are rapidly increasing. The last whorl is rounded. The aperture is broadly ovate, oblique, milky white within. The peristome is acute, sinuous above and slightly so below, much reflected at umbilical margin. The columellar margin is very oblique and descending.

The width of the shell is 16.2-23.5 mm. The height of the shell is 8.0-9.4 mm.
