= Hugh Fraser (East India Company officer) =

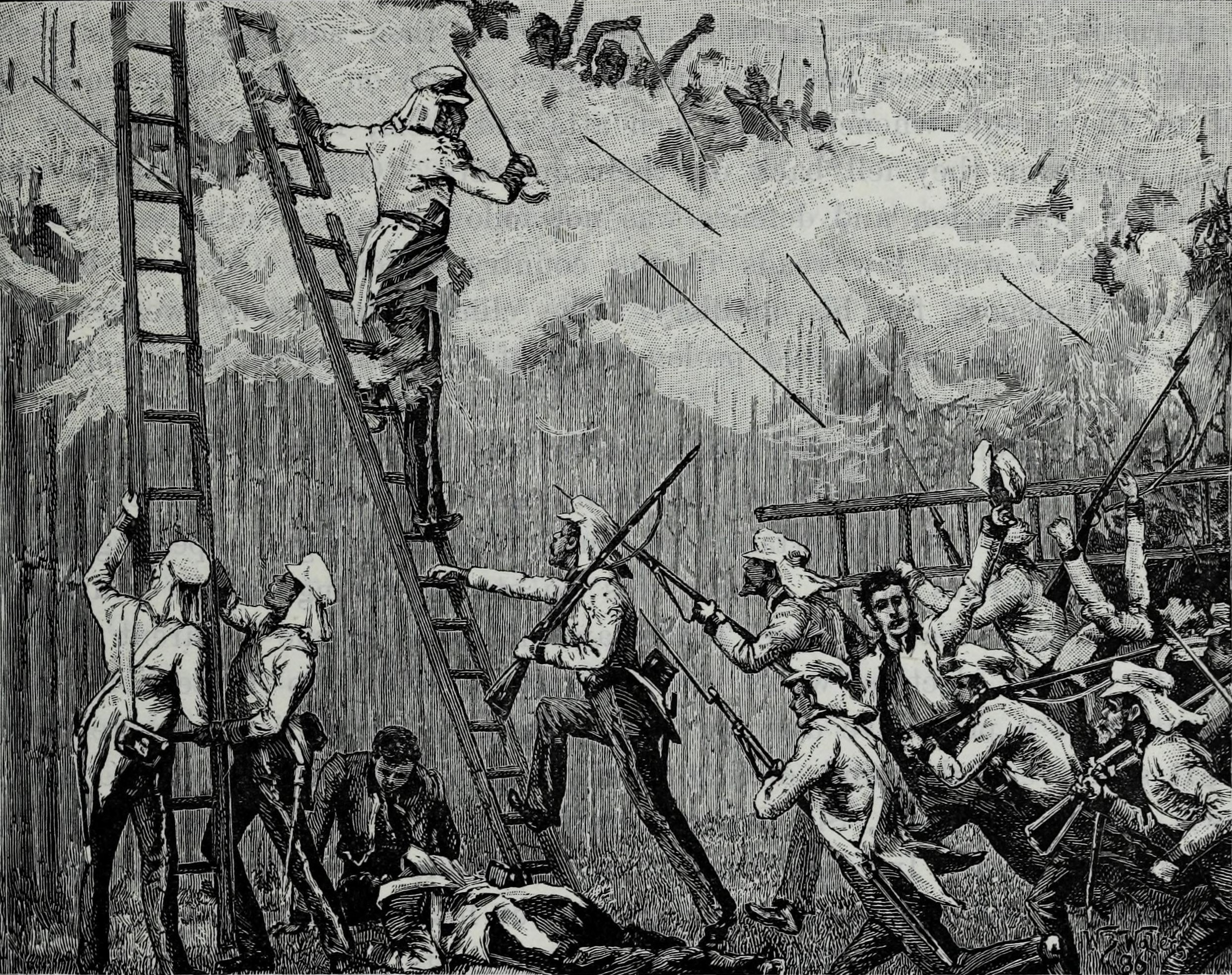
Major Fraser’s storming party carrying the stockade in front of Rangoon (by S. E. Waller, 1886)

Colonel Hugh Fraser, CB (7 August 1808 – 12 August 1858) was a British military officer and administrator in India and Burma.

Hugh Fraser was born in Inverness-shire on 7 August 1808. He was educated at The Inverness Academy and at Addiscombe Military Seminary.

He was commissioned 2nd Lieutenant in the Bengal Engineers, Honourable East India Company Army on 15 December 1826 and was promoted to Lieutenant on 28 September 1827. He arrived in India on 11 August 1828. For the following years he served with the Department of Public Works undertaking land and road surveys as well as building projects including the European Artillery Hospital at Mhow, 1837–38; the Allahabad Trunk Road, 1840; and the iron bridge at Lucknow, 1843–45. He was promoted to captain on 12 August 1840.

Fraser was appointed Garrison Engineer of Fort William and Civil Architect of the Bengal Presidency in August 1847 and was promoted to major on 7 October 1851.

In March 1852 Fraser was appointed Commanding Engineer during the Second Anglo-Burmese War. He distinguished himself at the attack on Rangoon on 12 April 1852. General Godwin in his official despatch stated, 'Major Fraser took the Ladders to the Stockade most gallantly, and alone mounted the defences of the enemy, where his example soon brought around him the storming party, which carried the Stockade; but at very severe loss on our part.' 'The conspicuous gallantry of Major Fraser commanding the Engineers and his indefatigable exertions since the expedition was resolved upon, more especially in the field, commanded the highest praise and the best thanks of the Supreme Government.' He remained in Burma for the next two years during which he supervised extensive building work and was later described as the 'Grand Architect of Rangoon'. For his services in Burma he was created a Companion of the Order of the Bath and promoted to Brevet Lieutenant-Colonel.

Fraser was promoted to lieutenant-colonel on 1 May 1855, to Brevet Colonel on 15 April 1857 and to colonel on 8 September 1857. In February 1856 he was appointed to officiate as Chief Engineer of the Punjab and in April 1857 Chief Engineer, North-Western Provinces at Agra. At the battle of Sussia (or Shahgunge) on 5 July 1857 Fraser, who rode with the Agra Militia Cavalry, distinguished himself by spiking the largest enemy canon, the only success of the day

From 30 September 1857 to 9 February 1858 he held the position of Lieutenant-Governor of the North-Western Provinces with the title Chief Commissioner.

Fraser died at Mussoorie on 13 August 1858 and is buried there. He married Florence Charlotte Penney, daughter of William Penney, Lord Kinloch, Senator of the College of Justice, at Calcutta on 4 November 1850. He had four children, Hugh Fraser (1851–1920), Magistrate and Collector, Indian Civil Service; Florence Fraser (1854–1884), artist; Charles Arthur Fraser (1857–1917), Colonial Secretary, Falkland Islands, Legislative Council Bahamas; Lennox Robertson Fraser (1858–1895), Executive Engineer, Public Works Department, Bengal.

Government offices
Preceded by E. A. Reade (acting)	Lieutenant Governor of North-Western Provinces; 30 September 1857 – 9 February 1858	Succeeded by Vacant; Administered by the Governor-General of India, Viscount Canning followed by- Sir G. F. Edmonstone
