= Godwin-Austen =

Godwin-Austen may refer to:

People

- Reade Godwin-Austen (1889–1963), British Army general
- Robert Alfred Cloyne Godwin-Austen (1808–1884), geologist
- Henry Haversham Godwin-Austen (1834–1923), topographer, geologist and malacologist, namesake of K2, son of Robert

Places

- Godwin-Austen Glacier near K2 in Gilgit-Baltistan, Pakistan
- Mount Godwin-Austen, also known as K2
