= Battle of Rangoon (1852) =

Battle of the Second Anglo-Burmese War

- Part of the Second Anglo-Burmese War
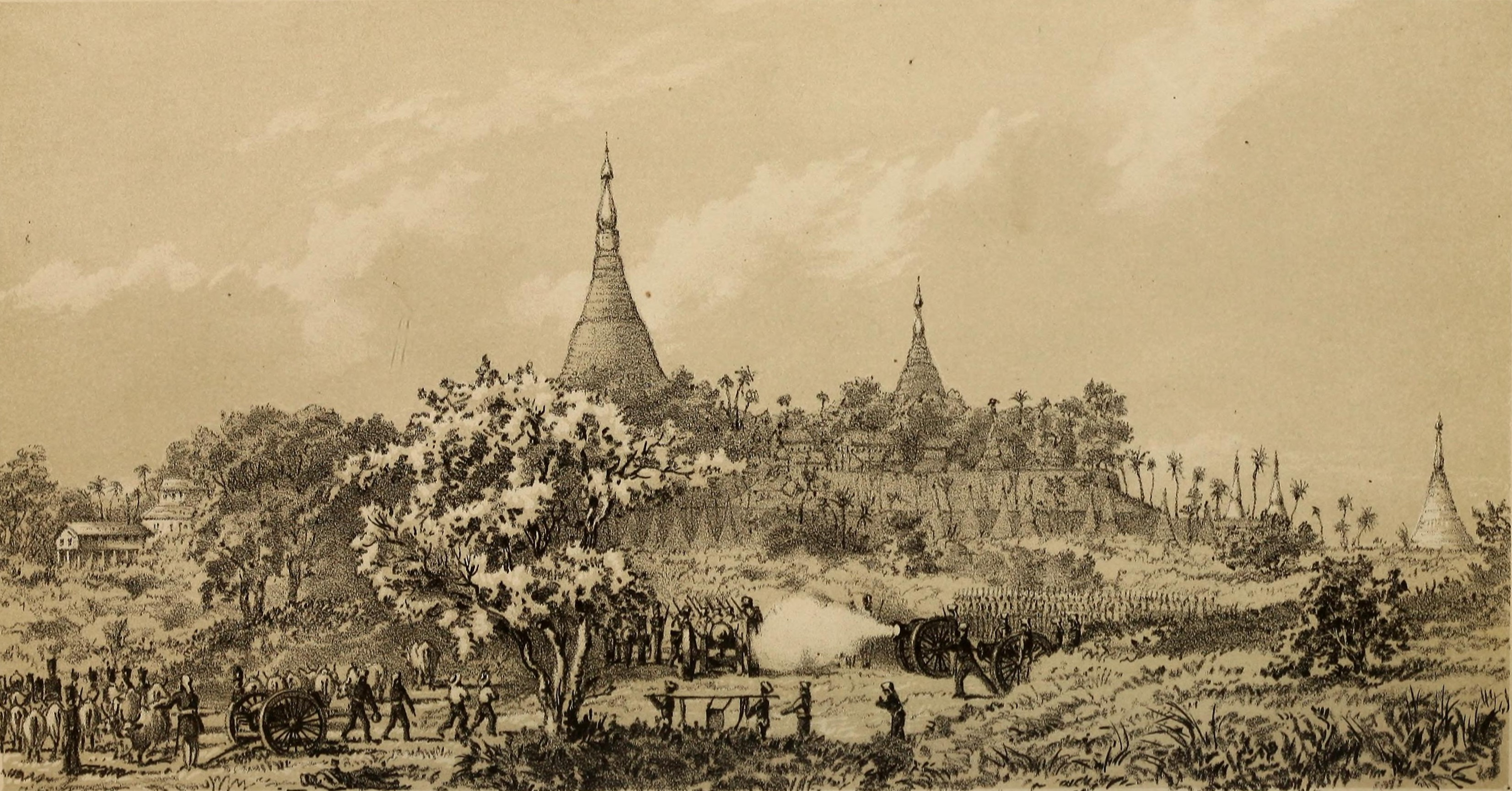
- Heavy Howitzer Battery, Rangoon, on 14th April 1852 (drawing by Lt. Blair)
| Date | 11th – 14th April 1852 |
| Location | Yangon 16.795°N 96.160°E |
| Result | British victory |

Belligerents
| British Empire: East India Company | Burma |

Commanders and leaders
| General Henry Godwin; Commodore George Lambert | ? |

Strength
| c. 5,800 infantrymen 2,270 sailors and marines tens of artillery pieces 19 steam ships | c. 10,000 men c. 100 artillery pieces |

Casualties and losses
| 34 killed 132 wounded (official British report) | At least c. 200 killed |
- Location in present-day Myanmar

The battle of Rangoon was fought between 11 and 14 April 1852 over the city of Rangoon (present-day Yangon), capital of the Third Burmese Empire, as one of the crucial clashes during the Second Anglo-Burmese War between 1852 and 1853. Just after a few days after sparking the conflict British expeditionary troops took control over the city and forced the Burmese army to retreat up north. British Empire then established Rangoon as the capital of British Burma until the end of its rule in 1948.

== Prelude ==
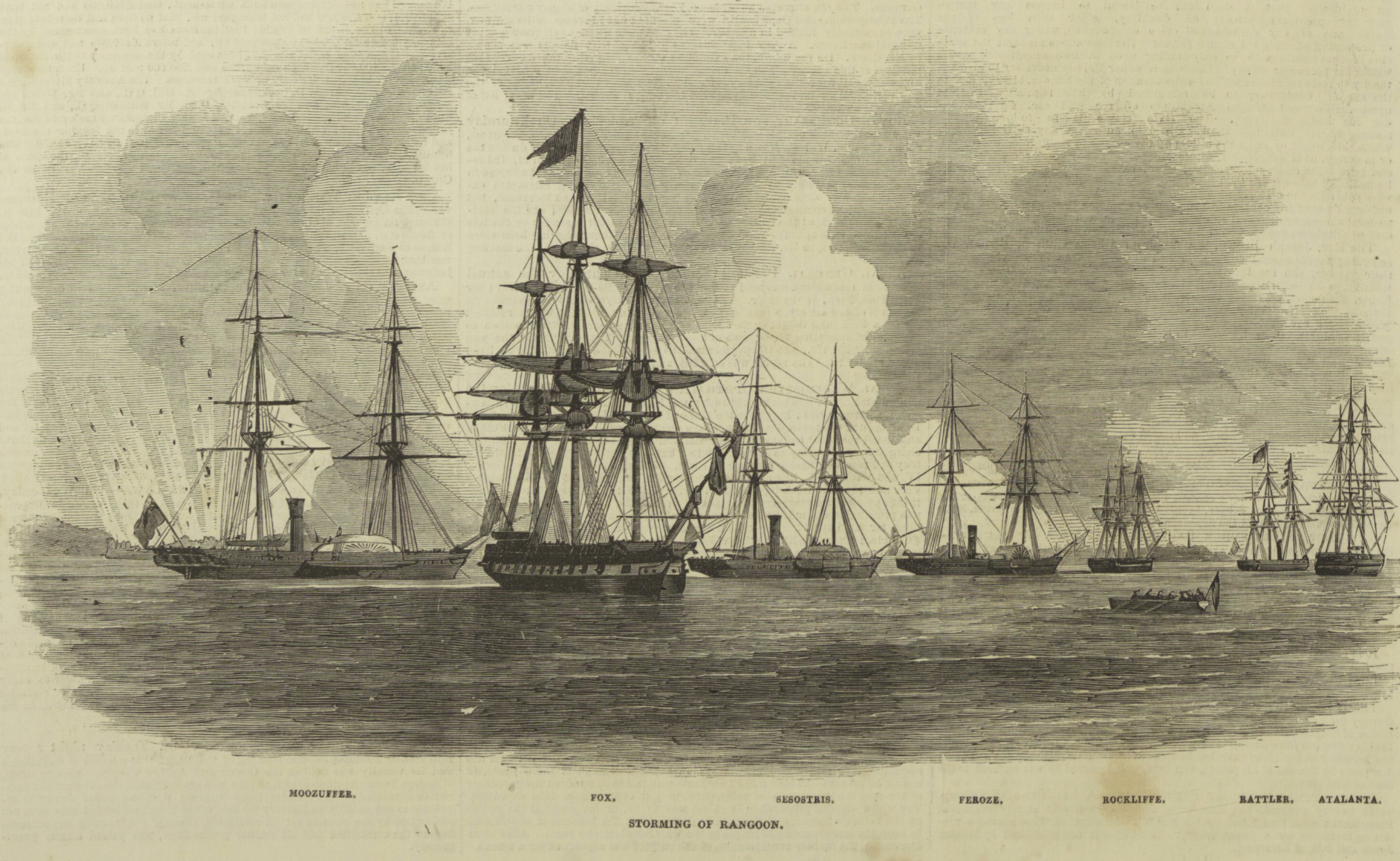
Storming of Rangoon by the British ships (The Illustrated London News, 1852)

In spring 1852, tensions between the Third Burmese Empire and bordering British India, as the ambition of British power grew in the region. In an intention to renengotiate a minor issues of the Treaty of Yandabo, which ended the First Anglo-Burmese War in 1826, Commodore George Lambert was dispatched to Burma by Lord Dalhousie, governor of British India. Presence of Lambert's contingent there eventually provoked a naval confrontation in extremely questionable circumstances by blockading the port of Rangoon and seizing the King Pagan's royal ship thus leading to the war.

For Burmese warfare an expeditionary force consisting of about 5,800 infantrymen was assembled in Calcutta and Madras, including also the 18th Royal Irish Regiment, 51st (2nd Yorkshire West Riding) Light Infantry, 80th Regiment of Foot (Staffordshire Volunteers) and 40th Bengal Native Infantry Regiment. Troops were then transported by nineteen vessels, most of them steamships, carrying 159 guns in total, and manned by 2,270 sailors and marines (British 1824 expedition to Burma disponed with single one steam ship). Troops were commanded by General Godwin, experienced officer and First Burmese War veteran.

The Bengal column reached the Yangon River on the 2nd April. A flag of truce was set up by on the HMS Proserpine steamer to receive the reply of the king to the ultimatum letter sent by the Governor-General. At the third defense stockade by the river a fire was opened on the ship, which marked the start of the conflict. While awaiting the arrival of the Madras column, the Commodore Lambert employed his vessels in levelling the stockades on the river, while General Godwin sent an expedition against the town of Martaban, lying opposite the British settlement of Moulmein. Martaban was captured in an hour, with the loss of seventeen British killed and wounded. On the arrival of the Madras contingent, all of nineteen ships of the fleet proceeded up the river in direction of independent Burma's capital, Rangoon.

== Battle ==
=== First Attack ===
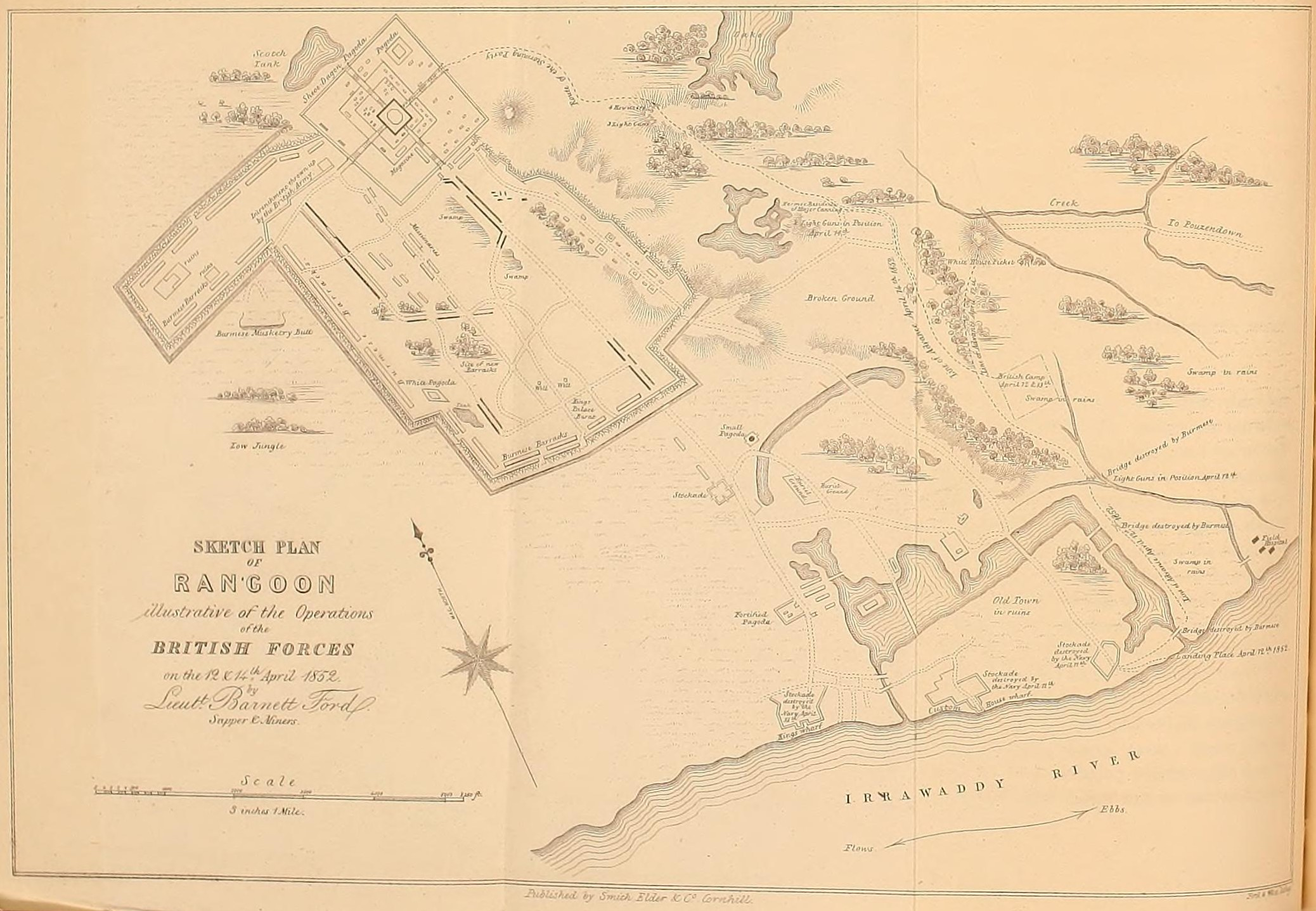
Sketch plan of the battle of Rangoon, 12th & 14th April 1852 (by Lt. Barnett Ford)

On 11 April British ships took their positions in front of Rangoon being met with a gun and artillery fire from two main strongpoints of Burmese defence: fortified area of the Shwedagon Pagoda, crucial sacred Buddhist centre of the city, and battery at the town of Dalla on the opposite river bank. On the same day Dalla post was captured by a small detachment of seamen, marines and men of the 18th Royal Irish Regiment, while some of the invading ships continued up the river to fight Burmese forces based in the town of Kemmendine.

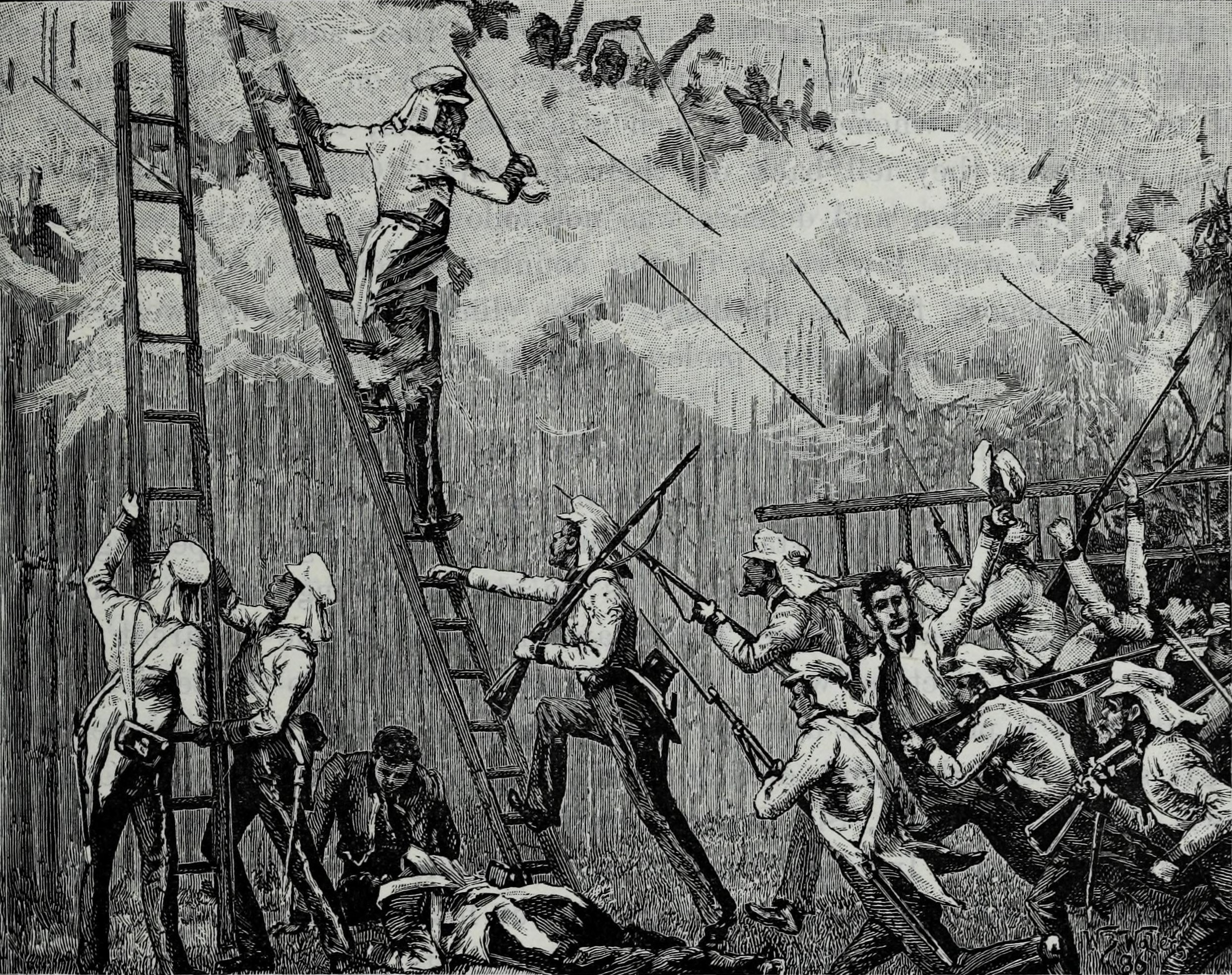
Major Fraser’s storming party carrying the stockade in front of Rangoon (by S. E. Waller, 1886)

British troops led by Godwin then landed on the morning of 12 April on the Rangoon coast to proceed against the heavily defended strongpoint around the Shwedagon Pagoda. Facing the resistance of another Burmese battery hidden in a jungle vegetation, British artillery was ordered to use twenty-four pound howitzers against the defenders posts. Also a successful British attack was carried by the troop of military engineer Major Hugh Fraser, who led the men to storm the city stockades with ladders.

After those actions British command resumed the operation, as intense sunheat decimed attacking soldiers. The next day, invading steamships heavily bombarded the city causing the Burmese Imperial governor to flee Rangoon by crossing the river to the other bank.

=== Second attack ===
After this artillery barrage, the whole British force at daybreak on the 14th April was sent to storm the city and the pagoda citadel, which stockade walls still remained solid. Burmese citadel defenders in number of about several thousands, expecting the enemy attack at the southern gate, had additionally fortified this post with gunmen and artillery pieces. Showing a tough resistance against the attackers, British responded by use of the heavy eight-inch howitzers eventually breaking some sectors of the wooden palisase. A storming party, consisting of 800 men drawn from the 80th Foot, the 18th Royal Irish, and the 40th Native Infantry Regiment under the command of Colonel Coote was then formed, and advanced to the attack under his guidance. The attack resulted in a breaking the citadel gate, after which a heavy fighting for the upward terraces on the way on the hilltop, where the pagoda is placed, also defended by Burmese cannons.

Official number of British casualties is 17 infantrymen, 3 of whom officers, and 17 marines killed and 132 wounded. Precise number of Burmese killed is remaining unclear: British collected about 200 bodies of the defenders, although more of those were presumably carried away by fellow fighters because of religious purposes.

== Aftermath ==
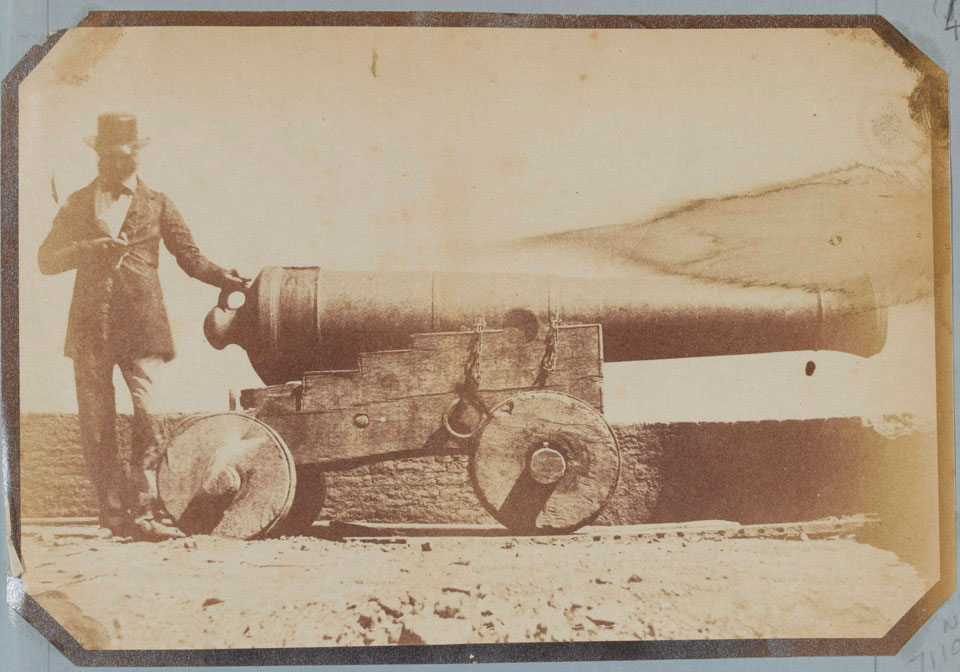
Captured cannon in Rangoon (by John McCosh, 1852)

Control over Rangoon and establishing a city harbor in 1853 supported British effords in the following nine-month campaign against the Burmese Empire. After war's end on 20 January 1853 independent Burma was forced to reduce its power to northern regions of the country. In following decades the British Empire did not give away its plans to conquer Burma resulting in the Third Anglo-Burmese War and annexation of the country in 1885.

Major Fraser, leader of the stockade attack on 12 April, then remained stationed in Rangoon and due to his supervision of extensive building work he was later described as the 'Grand Architect of Rangoon'.

== See also ==
- Second Anglo-Burmese War

== Biography ==
- Laurie, William Ferguson Beatson (1854). Pegu, being a narrative of events during the second Burmese war, from August 1852 to its conclusion in June 1853. London: Smith, Elder, & Co. pp. 422–427.
