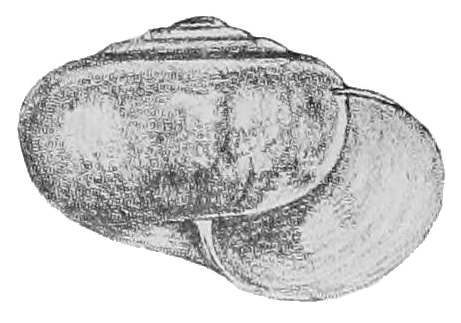
- A drawing of an apertural view of a shell of Staffordia staffordi

Scientific classification
- Domain: Eukaryota
- Kingdom: Animalia
- Phylum: Mollusca
- Class: Gastropoda
- Order: Stylommatophora
- Family: Staffordiidae
- Genus: Staffordia
- Species: S. staffordi

Binomial name
- Staffordia staffordi Godwin-Austen, 1907

= Staffordia staffordi =

Species of gastropod

Staffordia staffordi is a species of air-breathing land snail, terrestrial pulmonate gastropod mollusk in the family Staffordiidae.

The specific name staffordi as well as generic name Staffordia is in honor of Brigadier-General Stafford, who was in command of the punitive force which entered the Dafla Hills for the first time in the winter of 1874-1875.

== Distribution ==
The type locality of this species is Toruputu Peak, Dafla Hills, 7,000 feet (2,100 m), in India.

== Description ==
The shell is moderately solid, with a thick epidermis, very globosely conoid, rounded below. The umbilicus almost hidden. The sculpture is small. Elongate papillae arearranged longitudinally, and differing from all the other species collected in the Dafla Hills. The color is olivaceous ochre. The spire is low. The suture is shallow. The shell has 5 whorls with sides convex above, rather flattened on the periphery of the last whorl. The aperture is lunate, narrow, subvertical, milky white within, rounded below. The peristome is thin, slightly sinuate below, and nearly vertical near the columella.

The width of the shell is 13.2-15.2 mm. The height of the shell is 7.8 mm. The type specimen is not adult.
