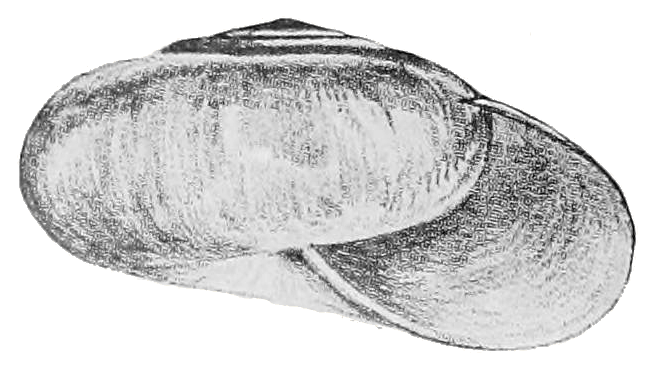
- A drawing of an apertural view of a shell of Staffordia daflaensis

Scientific classification
- Kingdom: Animalia
- Phylum: Mollusca
- Class: Gastropoda
- Order: Stylommatophora
- Suborder: Helicina
- Infraorder: Limacoidei
- Superfamily: Trochomorphoidea
- Family: Staffordiidae; Thiele, 1931

Families
- See text

= Staffordiidae =

Family of gastropods

Staffordiidae is a family of air-breathing land snails, terrestrial pulmonate gastropod mollusks in the superfamily Trochomorphoidea.

Staffordiidae is the only family in the superfamily Staffordioidea. This family has no subfamilies (according to the taxonomy of the Gastropoda by Bouchet & Rocroi, 2005).

Staffordiidae is a poorly understood family, because it occurs only in the Dafla Hills area of India. The fauna and flora of that area has not been researched sufficiently.

Various sources consider the family Staffordiidae as part of Dyakiidae or Ariophantidae/Dyakiinae.

== Distribution ==
The distribution of the Staffordiidae includes only India in the Dafla Hills.

This area is close to northern margin of the Indian Plate. The historical area of origin of the Staffordiidae has not been researched because the coastal area in southern Asia where it is found became uninhabitable after the Indian Plate and Eurasian Plate collided 50 to 55 million years ago. The original ancestral area of limacoid families is thought to be the Palaearctic region and south-eastern Asia. Thus, it has been hypothesized that the Staffordiidae colonized its current area from the southern margin of the Asian part of the Eurasian Plate during the Oligocene period.

== Genera ==
Genera within the family Staffordiidae include:

- Staffordia Godwin-Austen, 1907 – type genus of the family
  - Staffordia daflaensis (Godwin-Austen)
  - Staffordia staffordi Godwin-Austen, 1907
  - Staffordia toruputuensis Godwin-Austen

The generic name Staffordia is in honor of Brigadier-General Stafford, who was in command of the punitive force which entered the Dafla Hills for the first time in the winter of 1874–1875.

The foot of Staffordia is pointed. The peripodial margin is simple with a narrow pale margin. There are small right and left shell-lobes.

Reproductive system of Staffordia: the dart-sac is small, globose, with a long cord-like attachment to a coronal gland. The penis is simple. The spermatheca is long.

The radula of Staffordia has aculeate lateral teeth.

Comparison of shells of three Staffordia species:

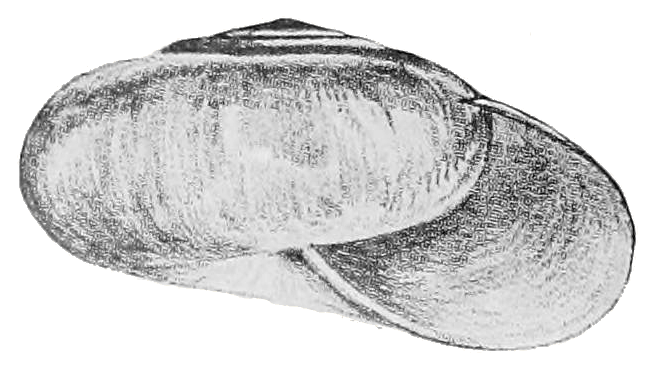
Staffordia daflaensis

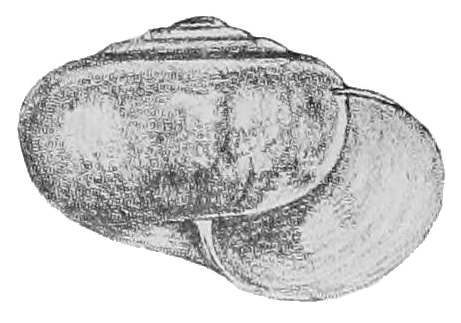
type specimen of Staffordia staffordi is juvenile

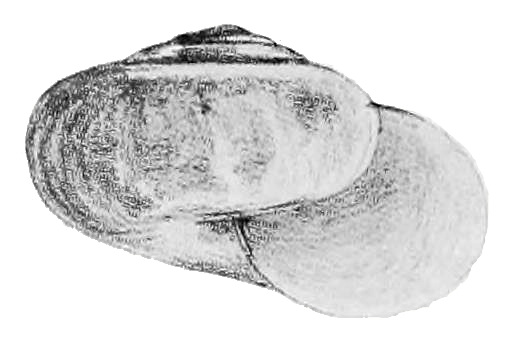
type specimen of Staffordia toruputuensis is juvenile

== Cladogram ==
Staffordiidae is considered a sister group of all other families in the limacoid clade.

The following cladogram shows the phylogenic relationships of this family and superfamily to the other families within the limacoid clade:

- limacoid clade
  - Staffordioidea
    Staffordiidae
  - - - Dyakioidea
        Dyakiidae
      - Gastrodontoidea
        - Pristilomatidae
        - - Chronidae
          - - Euconulidae
            - Trochomorphidae
          - - Gastrodontidae
            - Oxychilidae
    - - Parmacelloidea
        - Trigonochlamydidae
        - Parmacellidae
        - Milacidae
      - - - Zonitoidea
            Zonitidae
          - Helicarionoidea
            - Helicarionidae
            - - Ariophantidae
              - Urocyclidae
        - Limacoidea
          - Vitrinidae
          - - Boettgerillidae
            - - Limacidae
              - Agriolimacidae
