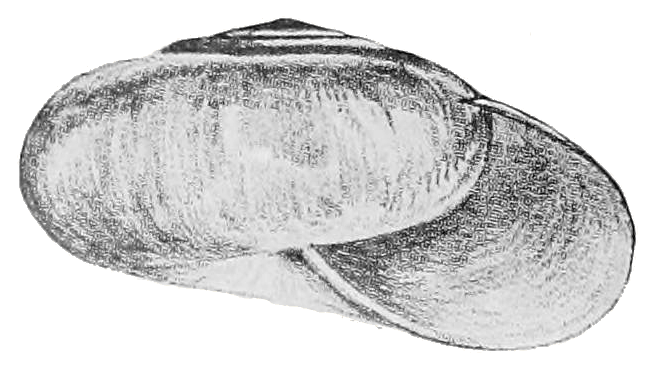
- A drawing of an apertural view of a shell of Staffordia daflaensis

Scientific classification
- Domain: Eukaryota
- Kingdom: Animalia
- Phylum: Mollusca
- Class: Gastropoda
- Order: Stylommatophora
- Family: Staffordiidae
- Genus: Staffordia; Godwin-Austen, 1907

= Staffordia =

Genus of gastropods

Staffordia is a genus of air-breathing land snails, terrestrial pulmonate gastropod mollusks in the family Staffordiidae.

== Species ==
Species within the genus Staffordia include:

- Staffordia daflaensis
- Staffordia staffordi
- Staffordia toruputuensis
