= Godwinia (disambiguation) =

Godwinia is a common name for two different groupings of organisms:

- Godwinia (plant), a genus of monocotyledonous shrubs of the family Araceae
- Godwinia (gastropod), a genus of terrestrial snails from family Oxychilidae native to Hawaii
