= George Lambert (Royal Navy officer) =

Royal Navy Admiral (1795–1869)

Admiral Sir George Lambert GCB
- Born: 8 September 1795
- Died: 5 June 1869 (aged 73)
- Military career
- Allegiance: United Kingdom
- Branch: Royal Navy
- Service years: 1809–1864
- Rank: Admiral
- Commands: HMS Alligator; HMS Endymion; HMS Imaum; HMS Fox; Nore Command
- Conflicts: Second Anglo-Burmese War
- Awards: Knight Grand Cross of the Order of the Bath

Admiral Sir George Robert Lambert GCB (8 September 1795 – 5 June 1869) was a Royal Navy officer who went on to be Commander-in-Chief, The Nore.

== Naval career ==
Lambert was the son of Captain Robert Alexander Lambert RN, himself the second son of Sir John Lambert, 2nd Baronet. His elder brother was General Sir John Lambert, GCB and his younger brother was Captain Henry Lambert.

Lambert joined the Royal Navy in 1809. Promoted to captain in 1825, he commanded HMS Alligator, HMS Endymion, HMS Imaum and then HMS Fox. In 1852, in HMS Fox, he was dispatched to Burma to deal with some infringements of the Treaty of Yandabo. Lambert, described by Lord Dalhousie, Governor-General of India, in a private letter as the "combustible commodore", eventually provoked a naval confrontation in extremely questionable circumstances by blockading the port of Rangoon and thus started the Second Anglo-Burmese War which ended in the British annexing the province of Pegu and renaming it Lower Burma.

He was appointed Commander-in-Chief, The Nore in 1863 and retired in 1864.

== See also ==
- Rear-Admiral Charles Austen whose death while in command of the Royal Naval forces in Burma led to the appointment of Lambert to the vacant command.
- O'Byrne, William Richard (1849). "Lambert, George Robert" . A Naval Biographical Dictionary . John Murray – via Wikisource.

Military offices
Preceded by Sir William Hope-Johnstone	Commander-in-Chief, The Nore; 1863–1864	Succeeded by Sir Charles Talbot
