= 1953 Achingmori incident =

Massacre in India

The Achingmori incident refers to an event in 1953 when a group of Daphla tribals of the Tagin people led by secessionist, Tako Mra, killed 47 members of an Indian government party including personnel of the Assam Rifles and tribal porters during an administrative tour in Achingmori in present-day Arunachal Pradesh. The indigenous communities, particularly the Tagin people, viewed Indian administrative expansion as a direct threat to their cultural and territorial sovereignty. As Indian authorities sought to establish greater control over the frontier regions, tensions grew between the local tribes and the government.

== Background ==
Administrative Divisions of India in 1951. Assam (NEFA) highlighted.

During the early years of independent India, the integration of the tribal regions of North-East Frontier Agency (NEFA) into the Indian Union was met with resistance.

Tako Mra, the leader of the Tagin group involved in the Achingmori Incident, was a seasoned tactician with prior military experience. He was deeply influenced by guerrilla warfare strategies, which he effectively employed to challenge external control over his homeland. In an address to the Indian state he had remarked,

“If India pushes to incorporate the Abor Hills, my men will fight back. We cannot go from being ruled by an elite in Britain to one in New Delhi.”

There were no roads or communication, and the tribals of the area were also unfamiliar with not only Indian administration, but any type of external administration. The Daflas were some of the most primitive of the tribes restricted to a certain area in the Daphla Hills, unaware of modern administration. In 1953 Nehru stated in the parliament that

"The fact that that place is not an administered area does not mean that it is outside — I am not talking about law, but of practice — the territory of the Indian Union. As a matter of fact, we are administering area beyond it, the border area that is administered. We have outposts and checkposts beyond that. These are virgin forests in between and the question does not arise of their considering in a constitutional sense what their position is. I do not think they are acquainted with any Constitution."

== Incident ==
On 22 October 1953, Patrol Commander Major R.D. Singh, accompanied by 22 personnel of the Assam Rifles, one Area Superintendent, two Jamadars, two interpreters, 17 village headmen and 100 porters, arrived at Achingmori. The purpose of the group was to investigate tribal feuds, other than its humanitarian role.

The group set up camp at a clearing surrounded by thick forest as suggested by the locals. The location had temporary huts, and Major Singh considered this as a sign of friendliness, resulting in lax protective measures. Sometime later 10 Daflas asked for permission to enter the camp. The sentry did not disarm them and as soon as they entered the camp following permission from Major Singh, the sentry was killed. Following this, 400 to 500 Daflas, armed with primitive weapons, launched an attack. A total of 47 members of the group, including the Major, were killed while the remaining were taken captive.

Nari Rustomji writes:

The Assam Rifles column had apparently reached Achingmori in the afternoon, when everything seemed quite normal. The villagers gave a happy welcome to the jawans, who proceeded in due course to distribute salt to them as a gesture of goodwill. The atmosphere appeared so friendly that the jawans stacked their weapons some distance away from where they were distributing salt and were completely unarmed. 2 people form the tagin tribe hid in the entrance of the goudam where the weapons were stacked then, all of a sudden, at a given signal, they were attacked with daos and when they went for their weapons in the goudam they were met at the entrance with daos and cut down down....

On the contrary however, Mra had famously stated that it was,

“a fight to ensure that our children inherit a culture, not a colony.”

== Aftermath ==
Major Singh was blamed for failing to take normal precautions. Two previous administrative parties had met with no such incident. The massacre also supposedly happened because of the tribal rivalries and history between the Daflas and Arbors. There were a number of Arbor porters in the group. The cause of the incident was also attributed to a rumour related to the government party and their goal of freeing slaves. During the incident one of the tribal porters, Tare Nosi, managed to escape despite a sword wound. He managed to travel 70 miles towards Along.

Information about the attack reached Gusar Outpost on 25 October. A small rescue party was sent however due to the destruction of a bridge by the Daflas, the rescue party could not reach the location. When the information reached Shillong, various outposts in Subansiri and the Abor Hills were reinforced with Assam Rifles platoons flown in by the Indian Air Force. The air force was also involved in extensive "reconnoitre". Assam Rifles sent some battalions to find those responsible for the massacre but were unsuccessful. Tagin tribes have very little permanent dwellings and can keep up evasion tactics over a long period

On 21 November 1953, Nehru said in the parliament,

It would have been easy enough for us to take punitive action... We could have bombed their villages and killed a large number of their people. No great skill was needed for that, but we are treating the incident normally as we would treat a dacoity or a riot, the only difference being that it took place in somewhat unusual surroundings. The policy of our Government is not to strike terror or kill and destroy indiscriminately. We shall certainly restore peace and order in this area, bring to book the real offenders and ring leaders, but we do not wish to punish the innocent and the misguided. We are confident that we can have the friendship and respect of these simple folks by adopting a firm, clear and sympathetic policy towards them.

Even though the perpetrators were given life imprisonment, they were released in three or four years.This short imprisonment did not go down well with the Galongs, the ones who had lost people in the massacre. The aggrieved tribals had been planning this since the day of the massacre and had been keeping a track on Komda for over a year. Kaul knew that punishing the tribals under the Indian Penal Code would not be considered as justice in their eyes. Kaul would go on to write,

They were disrobed of their red coats and all the gun licences cancelled and guns confiscated. Having had their revenge, they took it all calmly. I did not have the heart to lodge a case of murder against them. By the time the case would have reached the High Court in the plains, which was a pre-requisite, the evidence would have weakened from all angles. Such are the differences in the mensrea or "criminal intent" and I feel that criminal intent should be interpreted according to the mental makeup of the society one lives in. What may be a criminal intent in one place in a fully administered area, in my opinion need not be so in a very remote tribal area.

A large part of the restraint shown by India following this incident goes to Nari Rustomji, an advisor of the governor of Assam J D Daulatram. In place of an aggressive military reaction, Nari Rustomji got the guilty convicted after a procedurally sound trial. However, Ajai Shukla writes that the lack of Indian military in the area caused its own problems; "placing local sensibilities above national security also created the mindset that led to the 1962 defeat."

The Galo (formerly Galong) people, who suffered losses during the conflict, sought retribution against Mra. In a tragic turn of events, a Galo woman betrayed Mra by poisoning his drink, leading to his death in 1954 at the age of 29.

== See also ==
- Insurgency in Northeast India
- Insurgency in Arunachal Pradesh
- Tani Army
