= Edmund Godwin Austen =

English cricketer

Personal information
- Born: 15 November 1854; Chilworth, England
- Died: 25 January 1932 (aged 77); Hartley, Texas, United States
- Source: Cricinfo, 17 October 2020

Edmund Godwin Austen (15 November 1854 – 25 January 1932) was an English cricketer. He played in one first-class match in New Zealand for Canterbury in 1877/78. He was the brother of Henry Haversham Godwin-Austen.

== See also ==
- List of Canterbury representative cricketers
