= Mary Lemon Waller =

English painter

- Born: Mary Lemon Fowler; 1851; Bideford, Devon, England
- Died: 1931 (aged 79–80)
- Education: Royal Academy Schools
- Known for: Portrait Paintings
- Spouse: Samuel Edmund Waller

Mary Lemon Waller (born Mary Lemon Fowler) (1851–1931) was a British portrait painter, who specialised in child portraits.

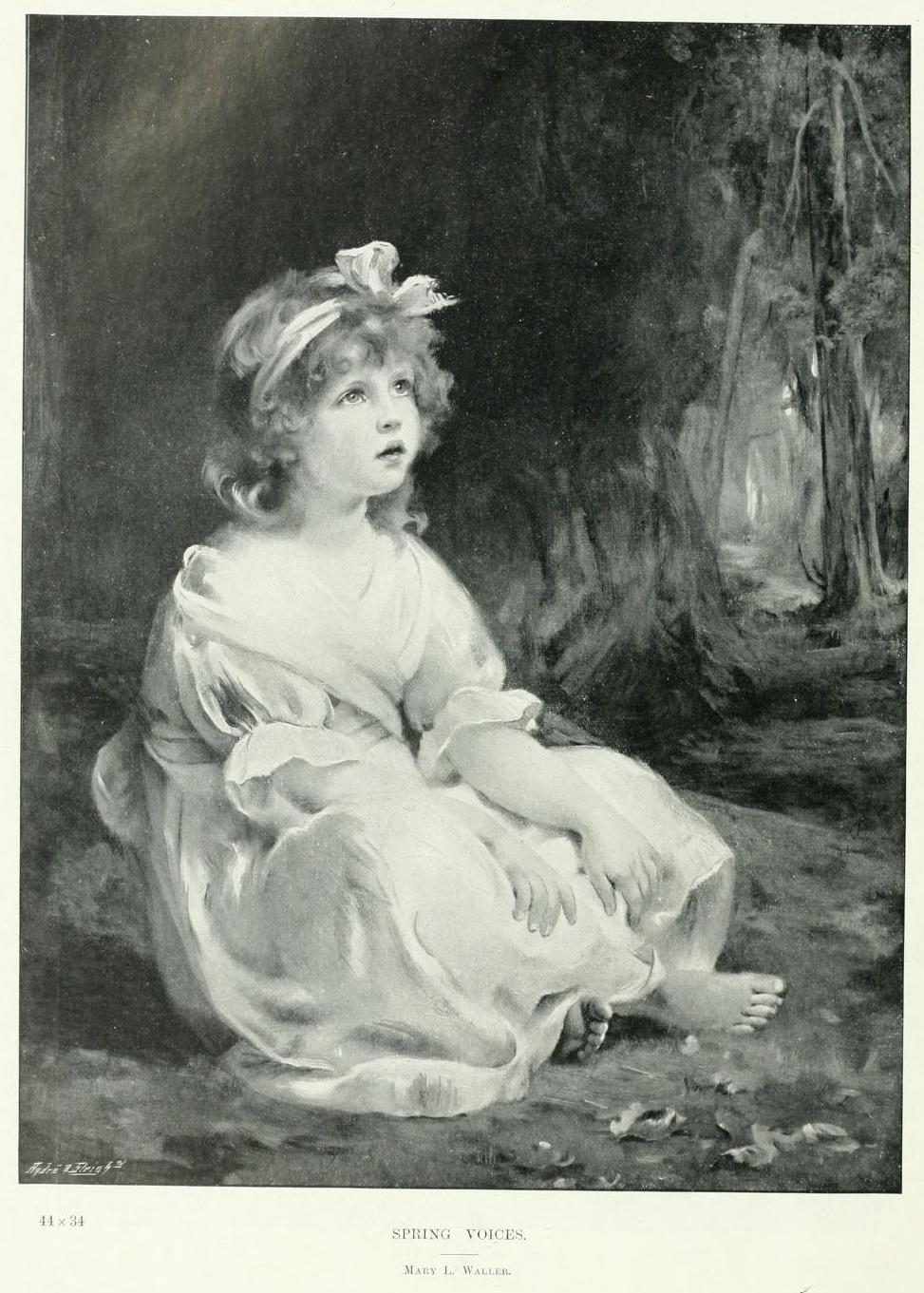
Mary Lemon Waller – Spring Voices

== Biography ==
Mary Lemon was born to Rev. Hugh Fowler of Burnwood, Gloucestershire. She began her education in art at an Art School in Gloucester, and later studied at the Royal Academy schools. Waller began exhibiting paintings as early as age 20, and exhibited at the Royal Academy from 1877 to 1904. She married genre painter Samuel Edmund Waller in 1874; the couple lived in London and had one son. Waller exhibited her work at the Palace of Fine Arts at the 1893 World's Columbian Exposition in Chicago, Illinois. In 1925, Waller became a member of the Royal Society of Portrait Painters.

Waller's works can be seen at several venues in the United Kingdom: Cragside, Royal Hallamshire Hospital, Literary and Philosophical Society of Newcastle upon Tyne, Oxford University Museum of Natural History, and Somerville College, Oxford.

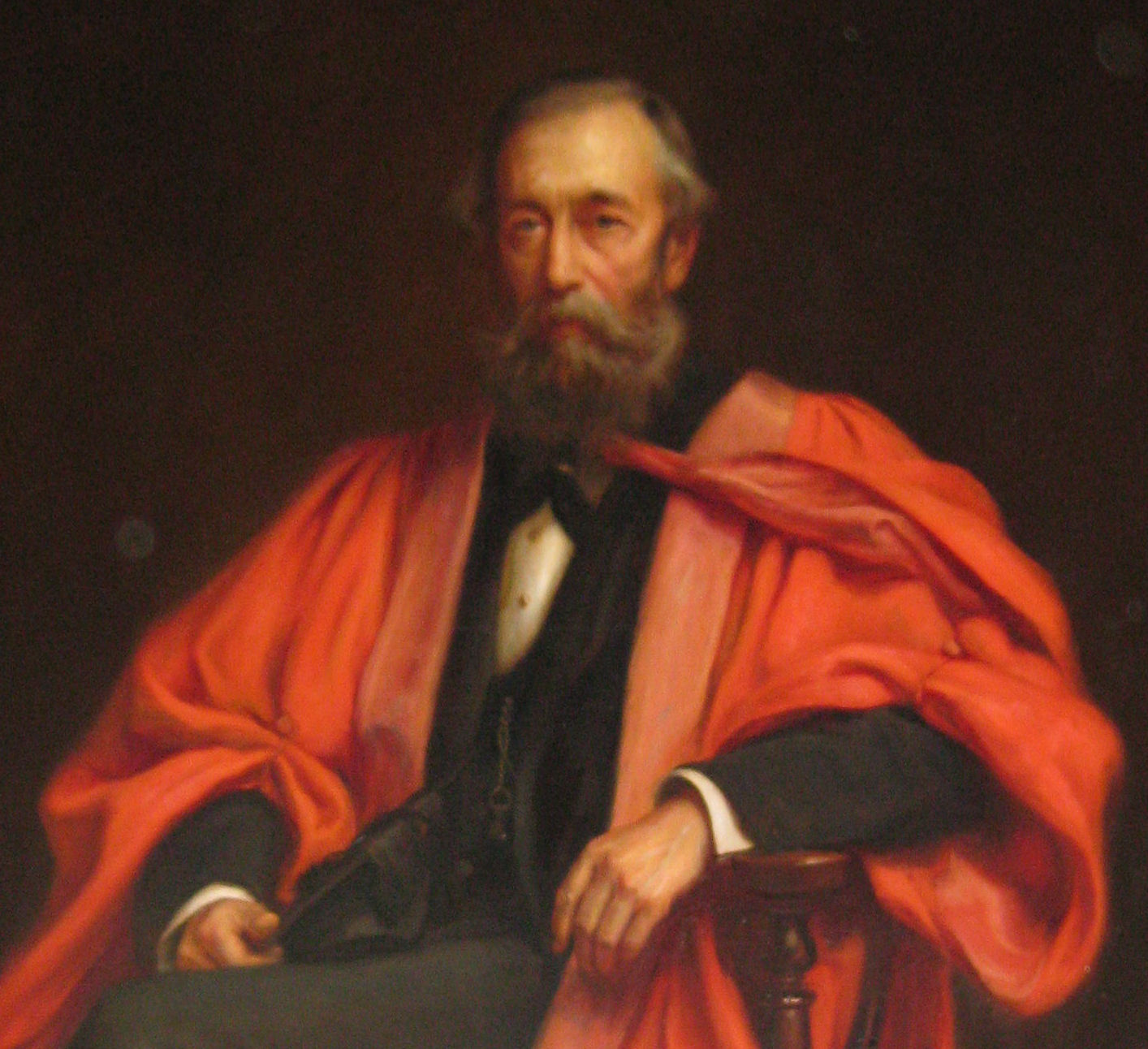
Mary Lemon Waller – Portrait of Henry Clifton Sorby

== Exhibitions ==
- Royal Academy Schools
- Royal Society of Portrait Painters
- Society of Women Artists
- Walker Art Gallery
- Royal Institute of Oil Painters
- Dudley Museum and Art Gallery
- Grosvenor Gallery
- Manchester City Art Gallery
- Royal Scottish Academy
