= HMS Fox (1829) =

Frigate of the Royal Navy

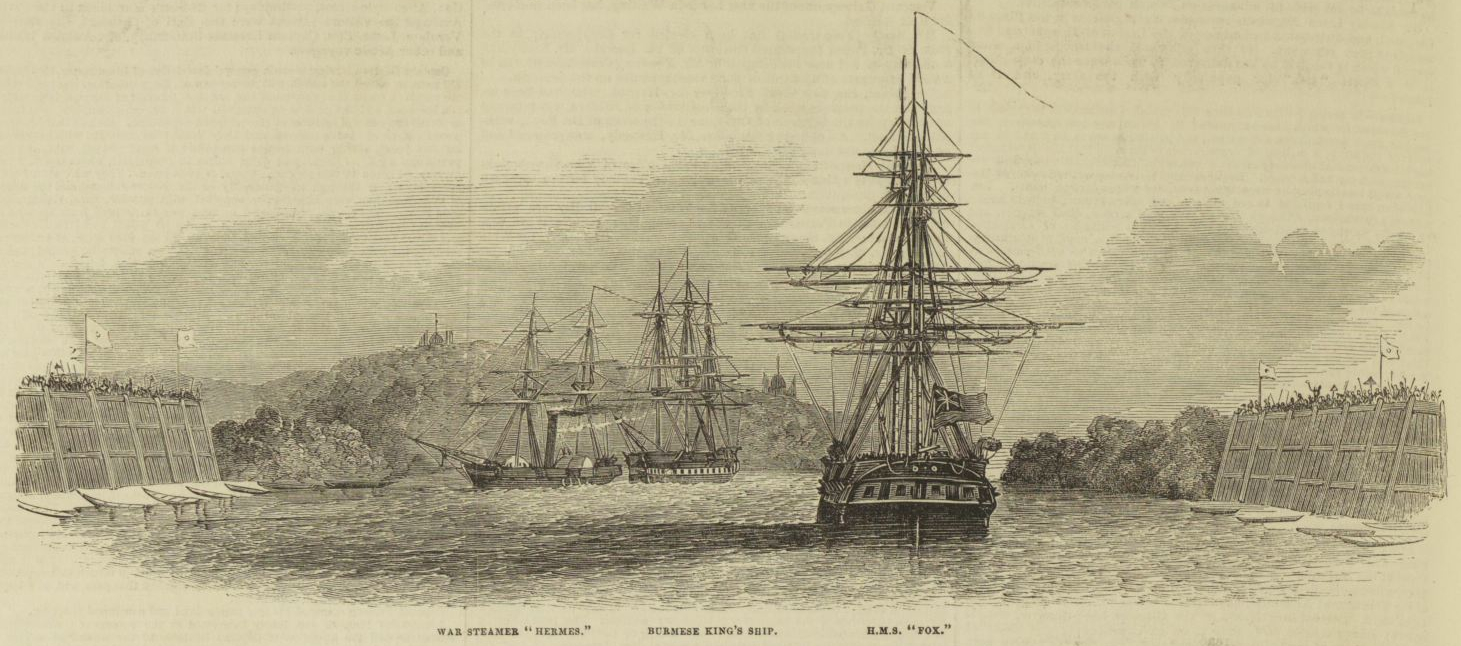
- HMS Fox at the very start, 10 January 1852, of the Second Anglo-Burmese War at the mouth of the Yangon River

History

United Kingdom
- Name: HMS Fox
- Completed: Portsmouth Dockyard

HMS Fox was a 46-gun fifth-rate launched in 1829, converted to a screw frigate in 1856, and broken up in 1882.

== Second Anglo-Burmese War ==
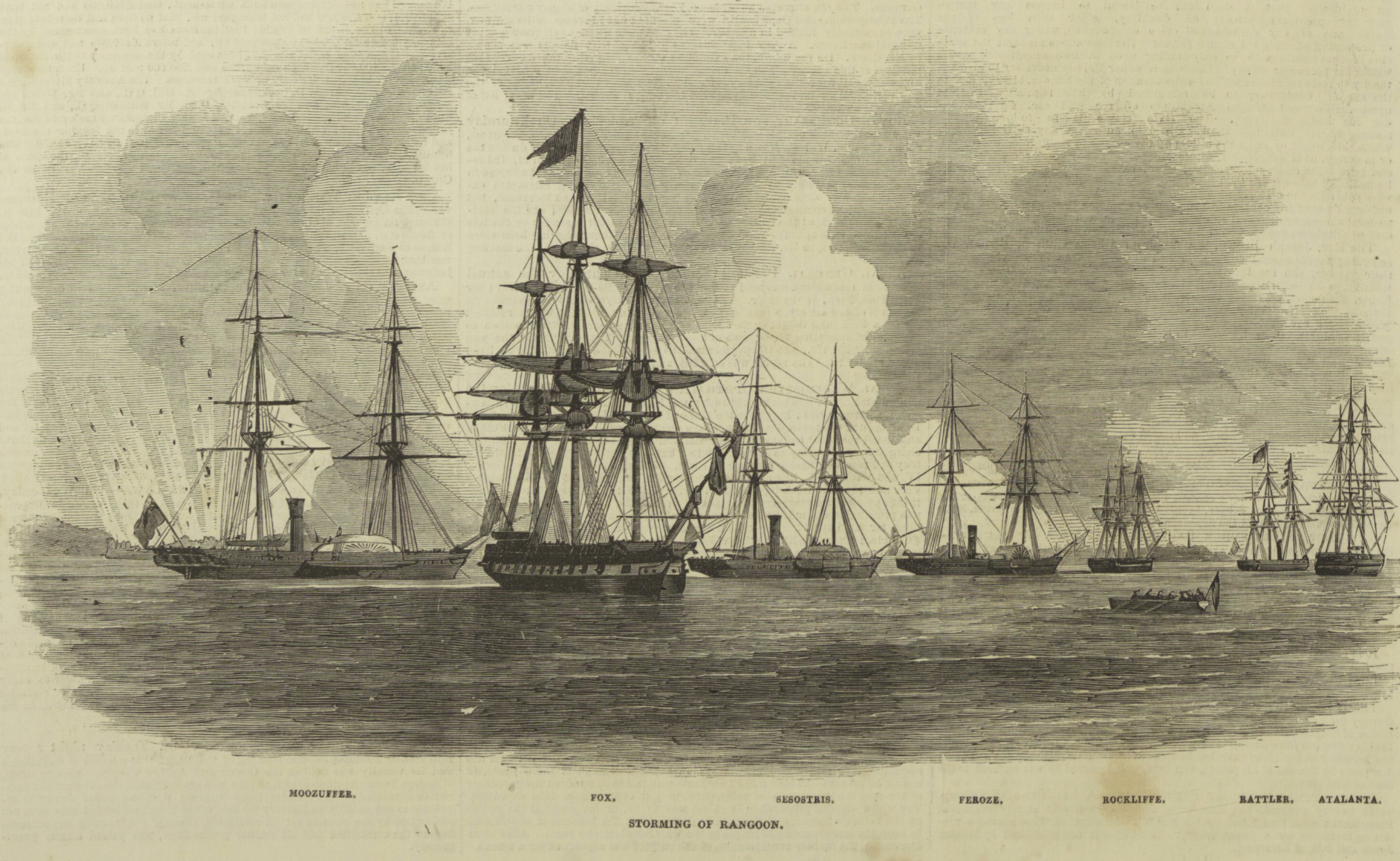
Fox at the storming of Rangoon, 14 April 1852

She took part in the Second Anglo-Burmese War.
