= John Lambert (British Army officer, born 1772) =

British Army officer (1722–1847)

General Sir John Lambert GCB
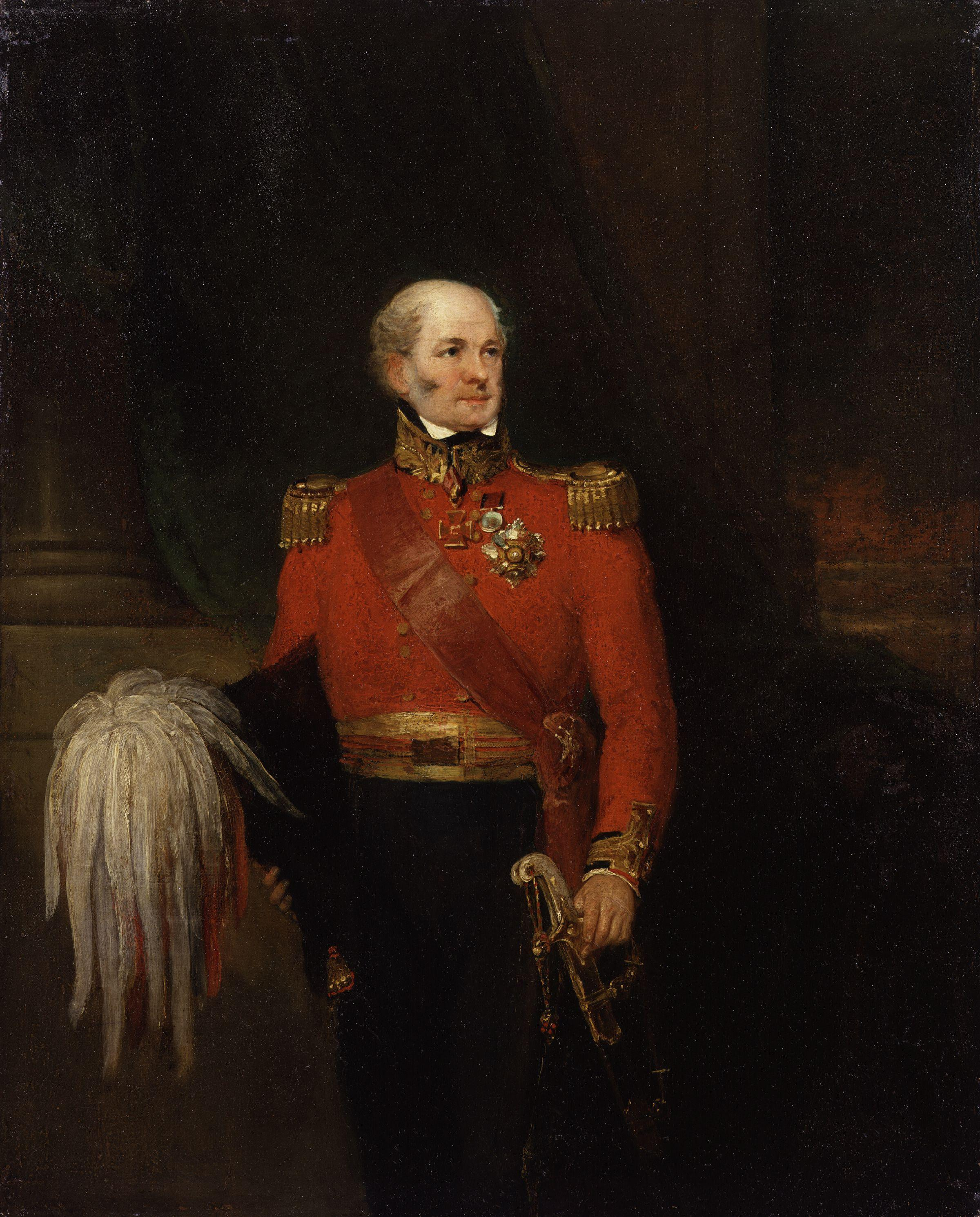
- Portrait by William Salter, 1838–1840
- Born: 28 April 1772
- Died: 14 September 1847 (aged 75)
- Military career
- Allegiance: Great Britain; United Kingdom
- Branch: British Army
- Service years: 1791–1847
- Rank: General
- Unit: 1st Regiment of Foot Guards
- Commands: 6th Division brigade, 10th Brigade
- Conflicts: French Revolutionary Wars; Flanders campaign; Siege of Valenciennes (1793); Siege of Dunkirk (1793); Battle of Lincelles; Irish Rebellion of 1798; Napoleonic Wars; Anglo-Russian invasion of Holland; Battle of Corunna; Walcheren Campaign; Peninsular War; Battle of Nivelle; Battle of the Nive; Battle of Orthez; Battle of Toulouse (1814); War of 1812; Battle of New Orleans; Second battle of Fort Bowyer; Hundred Days; Battle of Waterloo
- Awards: Mentioned in Despatches, Army Gold Cross, Order of the Bath, Military Order of Max Joseph, Order of St. Vladimir

General Sir John Lambert, GCB (28 April 1772 – 14 September 1847) was a British Army officer who served in the French Revolutionary and Napoleonic Wars and War of 1812. He is best known for his consummate actions whilst commanding the 10th Brigade at the Battle of Waterloo, which kept open the vital line of communication between Hougoumont and the rest of the Anglo-allied army.

== Life ==
Lambert entered the British Army on 27 January 1791, as an ensign in the 1st Foot Guards. He was promoted to lieutenant and captain on 9 October 1793. He served at the sieges of Valenciennes and Dunkirk, and was in the Battle of Lincelles in 1793. He was adjutant of the third battalion in the campaign of 1794, served with it during the Irish Rebellion of 1798, and in the expedition to Holland in 1799.

He was promoted captain and lieutenant-colonel on 14 May 1801. He served in Portugal and Spain in 1808, and was present at Corunna, and he commanded the light companies of the guards in the Walcheren expedition of 1809. He became colonel in the army on 25 July 1810, and embarked for Cadiz in command of the third battalion on 30 May 1811. In January 1812, he was sent to Carthagena with two battalions. He remained there three months, and in October he joined Wellington's army at Salamanca.

On 4 June 1813 he was promoted major-general, and was appointed to a brigade of the sixth division. He commanded at the battles of Nivelle, the Nive, Orthez, and Toulouse, and was Mentioned in Despatches. He was awarded the Army Gold Cross and was made KCB on 2 January 1815.

Having been sent to America, he joined the army under Sir Edward Pakenham, at the Battle of New Orleans, on 6 January 1815, with the 7th and 43rd regiments. In the unsuccessful attack on the American entrenchments, made two days afterwards, he commanded the reserve. Pakenham being killed, and General Gibbs mortally wounded, the chief command devolved on Lambert. He decided not to renew the attack, withdrew the troops which had been sent across the Mississippi, and retreating on the 18th, re-embarked his force on the 27th. He proceeded to Mobile Bay, where Fort Bowyer was taken on 12 February, and next day news arrived that a peace treaty had been signed.

Lambert returned to Europe in time to command the tenth brigade of British infantry at the Battle of Waterloo. The brigade, consisting of the 1st Battalion, 4th (King's Own) Regiment of Foot, 1st Battalion, 27th (Inniskilling) Regiment of Foot, and 2nd Battalion, 40th (2nd Somersetshire) Regiment of Foot, joined the army from Ghent only on the morning of 18 June, and was at first posted in reserve at Mont St. Jean. After 3 P.M. it was moved up to the front line to support the fifth brigade (Picton's). At about 6:30 PM, the French captured the key strongpoint of La Haye Sainte farm. After this success, they brought up several cannon and took the Anglo-Allied lines under fire at extremely close range. One battalion was deployed in square at the point where the Ohain road crossed the Charleroi to Brussels highway. At a range of 300 yards (270 m), the French artillery caused the unit enormous casualties within a short time. At day's end, the 1st Battalion had lost 105 killed and 373 wounded, a total of 478 casualties, without breaking. The unit was described as "lying dead in a square". Lambert was mentioned in Wellington's dispatch, and received the thanks of parliament, the order of Order of St. Vladimir, 3rd class, and that of Military Order of Max Joseph (commander). He commanded the eighth infantry brigade in the army of occupation in France.

He was promoted lieutenant-general on 27 May 1825, and general on 23 November 1841. He was given the colonelcy of the 10th regiment on 18 January 1824, and the Grand Cross of the Bath (G.C.B.) on 19 July 1838. He died at Weston House, Thames Ditton, on 14 September 1847, aged 75.

== Family ==
In 1816, he married Mary Morant, a daughter of John Morant of Brockenhurst Park, New Forest.

He was the son of Captain Robert Lambert RN, younger brother of Rear Admiral Robert Lambert RN and older brother of Captain Henry Lambert RN, Major General Samuel Lambert and Admiral Sir George Lambert RN.

== Cricket ==
Lambert was also an English amateur cricketer who made 12 known appearances from 1794 to 1810. He was mainly associated with Marylebone Cricket Club (MCC).

== Literature ==
- The Gentlemen's Magazine 1847
- Dod, Robert P.: The Peerage, Baronetage, and Knightage of Great Britain and Ireland for 1864: Including All the Titled Classes (1864), Kessinger Pub Co., ISBN 1-104-50139-2 p. 343

Military offices
Preceded by Sir Thomas Maitland	Colonel of the 10th (the North Lincolnshire) Regiment of Foot; 1824–1847	Succeeded by Sir Thomas McMahon
