= Tani Army =

Separatist army in Northeast India

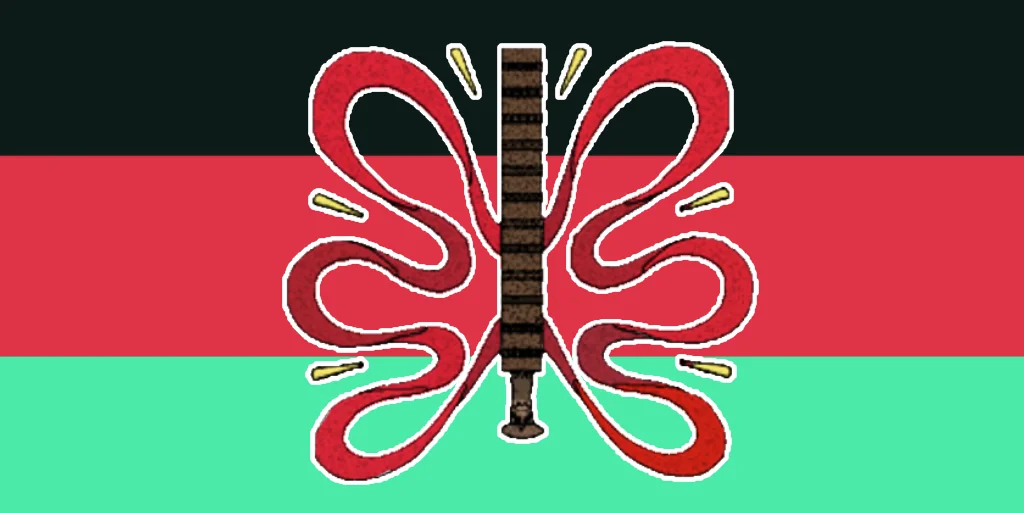
- Flag of the Tani Army
- Leaders: Anthony Doke (Chairman); Biri Ruja (POW). (Vice Chairman)
- Dates active: June 2005 – present
- Headquarters: Undisclosed camps near the Indo-Myanmar border
- Active regions: Arunachal Pradesh, India; Assam, India; Sagaing Region, Myanmar; China
- Ideology: Tani nationalism
- Size: Not publicly disclosed
- Part of: National Socialist Council of Taniland, formerly National Liberation Council of Taniland
- Wars: Insurgency in Northeast India

The Tani Army, also called the United Tani Army (UTA), is an armed Tani nationalist and separatist group active in the northeastern Indian state of Arunachal Pradesh.

== History and Ideology ==
It is associated with the National Socialist Council of Taniland (NSCT) with news reports having variously described the UTA as both the armed wing of the NSCT as well as a renamed continuation of it. The group espouses Tani nationalism, and like its predecessor has advanced the demand for a separate nation of Taniland for the Tani peoples.

The group's chairman, Anthony Doke, was earlier a member of the National Liberation Council of Taniland (NLCT), a Tani separatist group formed around 2005 that was largely neutralised by the Arunachal Pradesh Police by the end of 2010. The UTA emerged as a new outfit at the end of 2024.

Police has since then, booked UTA members under the Unlawful Activities (Prevention) Act (UAPA), and government statements and news reports since have described the outfit as banned or proscribed.

== Activities ==
In December 2024, the UTA publicly opposed the construction of several large dams in Arunachal Pradesh, demanding the cancellation of all memorandum of understanding and memorandum of agreement signed with hydropower developers. The group has also released videos showcasing their camps, reportedly located near the Indo-Myanmar border, and displayed their arsenal of weapons.

In January 2025, the Arunachal Pradesh Police arrested Tana Hassi, who was allegedly involved in recruiting youths into the UTA. Anthony Doke the Commander in Chief of Tani army, has however refuted these claims, asserting that the detained individuals are former NLCT members with no current affiliation to the UTA.

In September 2025, the group's Vice-Chairman Biri Ruja, was arrested along with three other cadres by Arunachal Pradesh Police

The group was also involved in sending soldiers to fight for the Myanmar junta against the Burmese People's Defence Force during the current Myanmar civil war in 2023 and 2024.

== See also ==
- Naga Army
- Insurgency in Northeast India
- Insurgency in Arunachal Pradesh
- 1953 Achingmori incident
