= Robert Alfred Cloyne Godwin-Austen =

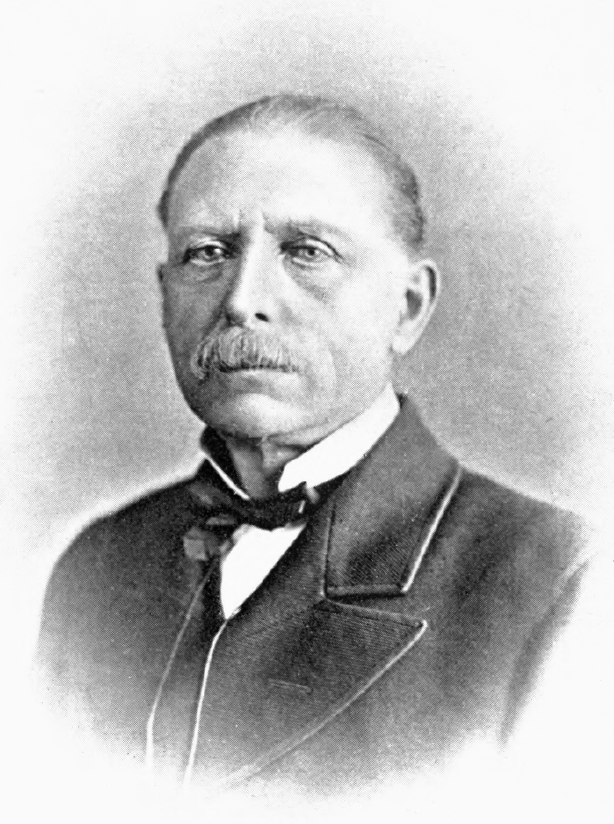
R.A.C. Godwin-Austen

Robert Alfred Cloyne Godwin-Austen FRS (17 March 1808 – 25 November 1884) was an English geologist.

Godwin-Austen was the eldest son of Sir Henry E. Austen. He was educated at Oriel College, Oxford, of which he became a fellow in 1830. He afterwards entered Lincoln's Inn. In 1833 he married the only daughter and heiress of Major General Sir Henry Godwin KCB, and in 1854 he took the additional name of Godwin by Royal licence. At Oxford as a pupil of William Buckland he became deeply interested in geology. Soon afterwards he met and was inspired by Henry De la Beche and assisted him by making a geological map of the neighbourhood of Newton Abbot in Devon, which was embodied in the Geological Survey map. He also published an elaborate memoir On the Geology of the South-East of Devonshire (Trans. Geol. Soc. ser. 2, vol. viii.).

His attention was next directed to the Cretaceous rocks of Surrey, his home county - his estates being situated at Chilworth and Shalford near Guildford. Later he dealt with the superficial deposits bordering the English Channel, and with the erratic boulders of Selsey. In 1855 he brought before the Geological Society of London his paper On the possible Extension of the Coal-Measures beneath the South-Eastern part of England, in which he pointed out on well-considered theoretical grounds the likelihood of coal measures being some day reached in that area. In this article he also advocated the freshwater origin of the Old Red Sandstone, and discussed the relations of that formation, and of the Devonian, to the Silurian and Carboniferous.

Godwin Austen was entrusted with the completion of a work intended by the naturalist Edward Forbes, F.R.S. which was entitled Natural History of the European Seas published in 1859.

He was elected F.R.S. in 1849, and in 1862 he was awarded the Wollaston Medal by the Geological Society of London, on which occasion he was styled by Roderick Murchison pre-eminently the physical geographer of bygone periods. He died at Shalford House near Guildford. His son, Henry Haversham Godwin-Austen was also a geologist.
