= HMS Imaum =

76-gun third rate ship of the line

History

United Kingdom
- Name: HMS Imaum
- Builder: Bombay
- Launched: 10 November 1826
- Acquired: 9 March 1836, from Imaum of Muscat
- Fate: Broken up, 1863

General characteristics
- Class & type: 76-gun third rate ship of the line
- Tons burthen: 1776 bm
- Length: 177 ft (54 m) (gundeck)
- Beam: 48 ft 4 in (14.73 m)
- Depth of hold: 21 ft (6.4 m)
- Propulsion: Sails
- Sail plan: Full-rigged ship
- Armament: 76 guns of various weights of shot

HMS Imaum (sometimes referred to as Imaun) was a 76-gun third rate ship of the line of the Royal Navy. She was built in Bombay as Liverpool, and launched on 10 November 1826 for the Imaum of Muscat, Said bin Sultan, who presented the ship to the Royal Navy on 9 March 1836.

She was placed on harbour service at Port Royal, Jamaica in 1842, and was broken up in 1863.

Imaum's figurehead was preserved in the Maritime Museum of the Atlantic at Halifax, Nova Scotia, Canada until 2022, but is in the process of being transported to a museum in Dubai.
