= Henry Haversham Godwin-Austen =

English topographer and naturalist (1834–1923)

Lieutenant-Colonel Henry Haversham Godwin-Austen FRS FZS FRGS MBOU
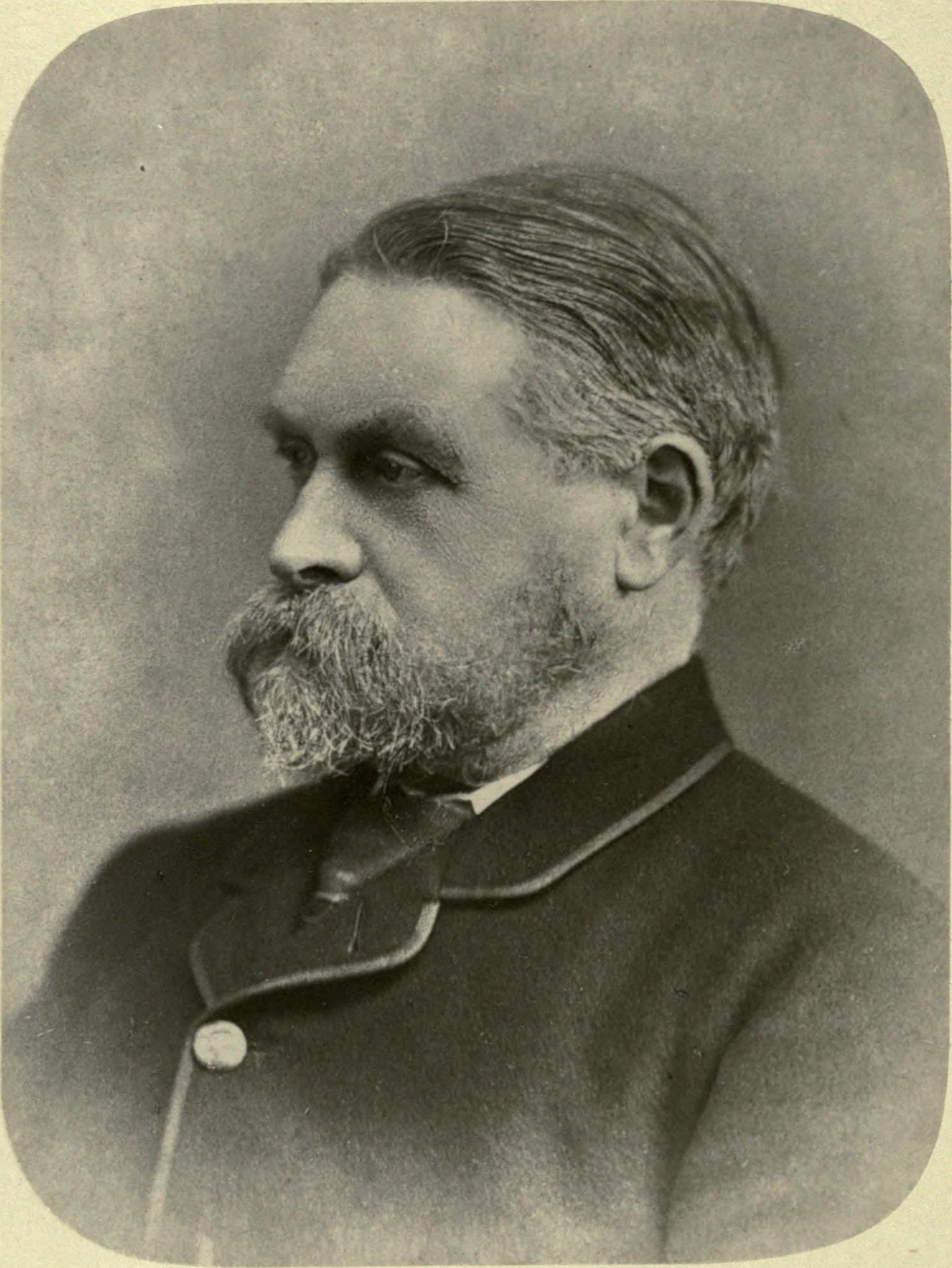
- Godwin-Austen in an image published in 1890
- Born: H.H. Austen; 6 July 1834; Newton Abbot, England
- Died: 2 December 1923 (aged 89); Godalming, England
- Education: Royal Military College, Sandhurst
- Spouses: Kudidje (1858–1860?); Pauline G. Plowden (1861–1871); Jessie Robinson (1881–1913)
- Children: 3
- Scientific career
- Fields: Topography, surveying, malacology, ornithology, geology
- Workplaces: Trigonometrical Survey of India, British Museum (Natural History)
- Author abbrev. (zoology): Godwin-Austen

Signature
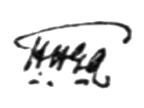

Henry Haversham Godwin-Austen (6 July 1834 – 2 December 1923), known until 1854 as Henry Haversham Austen, was an English topographer, surveyor, naturalist and geologist.

He explored the mountains in the Himalayas and surveyed the glaciers at the base of K2, also known as Mount Godwin-Austen. Geographer Kenneth Mason called Godwin-Austen "probably the greatest mountaineer of his day". He also remains the most important investigator of the terrestrial molluscs of the Indian subcontinent.

== Early life ==
The eldest son of the eighteen children of the geologist Robert Austen, who in 1854 added Godwin to his surname by royal licence, Henry Haversham was probably born at Ogwell House, near Newton Abbot, Devon, where his father had recently taken up residence. His father's family, landowners in Cheshire and Surrey since the 12th century, had a history as merchant venturers, soldiers, scholars, and collectors. His grandfather, Sir Henry Edmund Austen (1785–1871), was a High Sheriff and Deputy Lieutenant for Surrey and a gentleman of the Privy Chamber to King William IV. His great-grandfather, Robert Austen (died 1797), married Lady Frances Annesley, a descendant of Arthur Annesley, 1st Earl of Anglesey.

Henry's mother, Maria Elizabeth Godwin, was the only child of Major-General Sir Henry Godwin (1784–1853), who had fought in the First Anglo-Burmese War and who commanded the British and Indian forces in the Second. His brother Edmund Godwin Austen played first-class cricket for Canterbury in New Zealand.

Henry was educated at the Royal Grammar School, Guildford, and then from 1848 to 1851 at the Royal Military College, Sandhurst. At Sandhurst he learnt military surveying from Captain Robert Petley and was a contemporary of the future Lord Roberts.

== Life in Burma and India ==
In 1851, after leaving the Royal Military College, Austen was commissioned into the 24th Foot. In early 1853 he arrived in Burma at the end of the Second Anglo-Burmese war, serving as aide-de-camp to his maternal grandfather, General Sir Henry Godwin. The latter died unexpectedly in 1853, and as a result his daughter's family added the name of Godwin to their own, becoming Godwin-Austen.

While in Burma, he surveyed the Irrawaddy Delta, and this work came to the favourable notice of Sir Andrew Scott Waugh, Surveyor General of India. After periods in Simla and Sialkot, Godwin-Austen was posted to Peshawar under the command of Major General Thomas Reed. In 1856, he joined the Trigonometrical Survey of India and began to work in Kashmir under Captain Thomas George Montgomerie. In May 1856 he was promoted Lieutenant, in March 1857 he was formally appointed to the Survey of India, and on 29 October 1858 he was further promoted to Captain.

A liaison with an Indian lady named Kudidje, the daughter of a Muslim landowner of Poonch, probably a Sudhan, may have begun as early as 1855, and this led to the birth on 5 May 1857 of a son who was named Edward. Another source says that Edward was born at Sialkot on 15 March 1859. The relationship is seen by one biographer as probably an obstacle to Godwin-Austen's advancement in India. In April 1857 Godwin-Austen was posted to Kashmir. In June 1858 he married Kudidje in a ceremony near Budrawar; from the British point of view the marriage was legal as it satisfied Muslim conditions. In November 1858, Godwin-Austen was seriously injured in an attack near Udhampur which left him unconscious, and in April 1859 he took a year's home leave, joining the Second Battalion of his regiment in England. While there, he became a Fellow of the Royal Geographical Society.

From 1857 to June 1860 he had worked for the Survey of India, mainly around the Kazi Nag, Pir Panjal, and Marau-Warwan regions. He was given a permanent post in the Trigonometrical Survey and in 1860 mapped Shigar and the lower Saltoro Valley of Baltistan as far as the south face of K1, Masherbrum. In 1861, he traversed the Skoro La, beyond Skardu and Shigar, where he surveyed the Karakoram glaciers: Baltoro, Punmah, Biafo, Chiring, almost as far as the Old Mustagh Pass and Hispar. On this expedition, he climbed at least 1000 m above Urdukas on the Baltoro Glacier, and fixed the height and position of K2 for the first time. He was often at altitudes over 20,000 feet (6100 m), although he had no knowledge of technical mountaineering and carried no ice axe or climbing rope. Kenneth Mason, who knew Godwin-Austen personally, described him as "slight and extremely hardy, with little weight to carry, he had immense endurance and great enthusiasm." Of his accurate and beautiful surveys, Godwin-Austen wrote, "I was always mapping with a geological eye, and that makes a man look well at the country."

In 1860, after a separation of some fifteen months, Godwin-Austen and Kudidje were reunited, and she accompanied him on his first expedition to Baltistan. However, after September 1860 she disappears from the record, and Godwin-Austen arranged the adoption of their son by a couple named Milner, so it is likely that Kudidje had died by late 1860. A few months before his death in 1923, Godwin-Austen received the surprise of a letter from a Mrs Barclay, one of their grandchildren, a daughter of Edward, and in reply recalled of Kudidje "She was a good wife with me and if there is anything now left that I can look back on and love, it is her memory and the way she looked after me."

On 5 April 1861 Godwin-Austen married Pauline Georgiana, daughter of Lieutenant-Colonel Arthur Wellesley Chichele Plowden, granddaughter of William Plowden (1787–1880), an East India Company director, and niece of William Chichele Plowden, an Indian civilian. Their first child, Alfred, was born in March 1862, but lived less than three months. Pauline herself died in 1871, leaving one surviving son, Arthur.

In 1862, Godwin-Austen surveyed upper Changchenmo, Pangong district, and the Zanskar ranges, resulting in his Notes on the Pangong Lake District of Ladakh (1864).

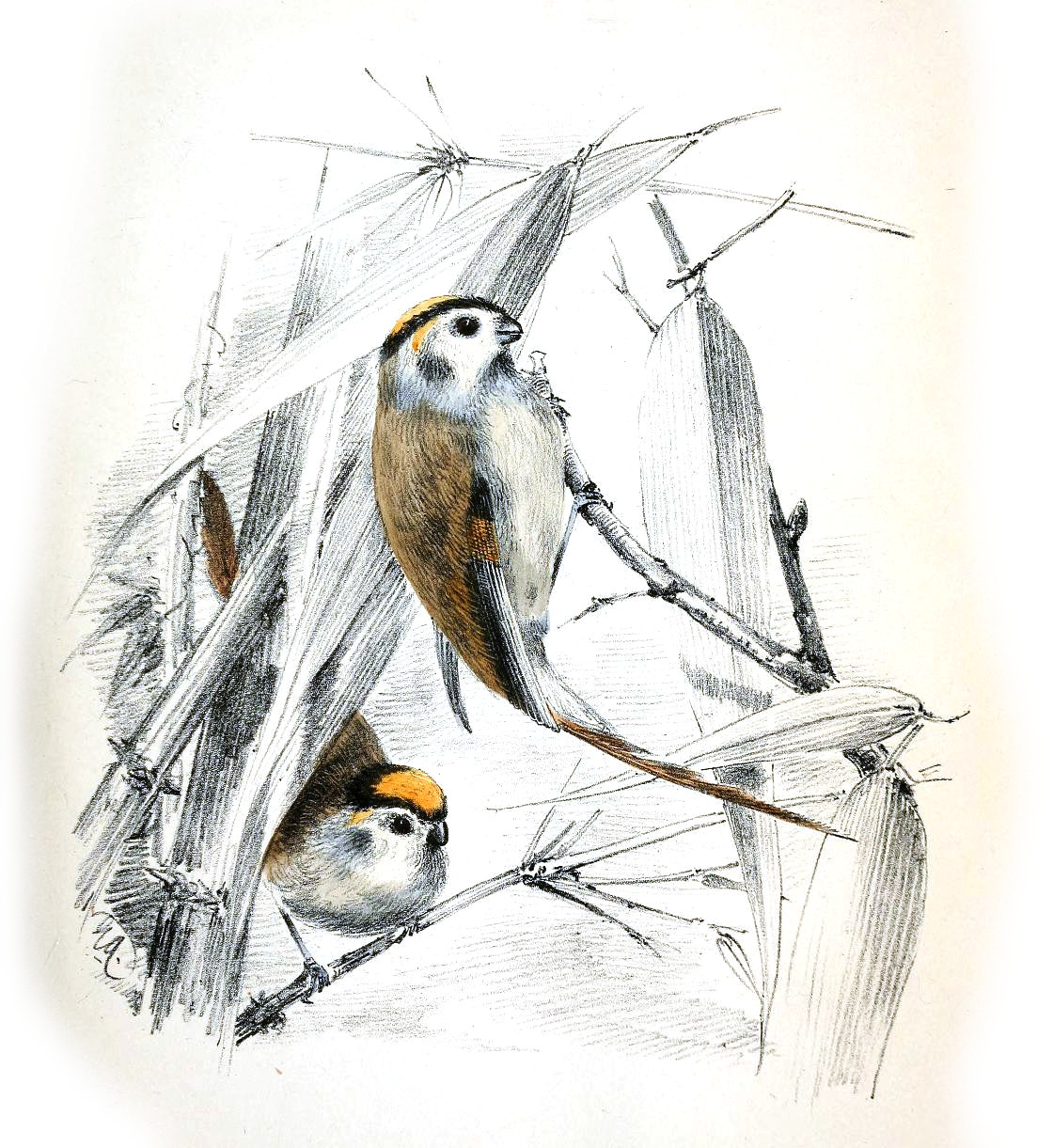
Illustration by Godwin-Austen of Paradoxornis nipalensis which he described as Suthora daflaensis

Although he gave great attention to geology and topography, his greatest interest lay in collecting non-marine molluscs and in identifying birds. He published his Birds of Assam (1870–1878) and described a number of birds for the first time, some with Arthur Hay, 9th Marquess of Tweeddale. Most of these notes were published in the Journal of the Asiatic Society of Bengal and Godwin-Austen sometimes drew illustrations of the new bird species. He was particularly active in ornithology after 1863, when he was posted in the eastern Himalayas as part of the political mission to Bhutan headed by Ashley Eden. He surveyed the Garo, Khasi, and Jaintia hills, and in 1875 joined an expedition into the Daphla Hills. Venturing into anthropology, he described the monuments and customs of the Khasi tribes.

== Retirement ==
In 1877, Godwin-Austen retired from the Trigonometrical Survey of India with the rank of Lieutenant Colonel, as his health was beginning to deteriorate, but back in England he recovered. In 1881, he married lastly Jessie, daughter of John Harding Robinson, an Examiner in the House of Lords. She was 20 and he 47. They remained married until his wife's death in 1913, and the marriage has been called "a union of love and mutual support". An obituary stated that, "of a most attractive disposition and singular charm of manner, Godwin-Austen was much beloved by his contemporaries". He served as a justice of the peace from 1885.

When his father died in 1884, Godwin-Austen inherited an estate and substantial house at Shalford, in Surrey. The estate no longer provided sufficient income to fund such a house. Unable to sell land because of an entail, he was declared bankrupt in 1899, although through the sale of the house he had discharged the bankruptcy by 1902. Thereafter he lived at another property on the estate, Nore House near Godalming.

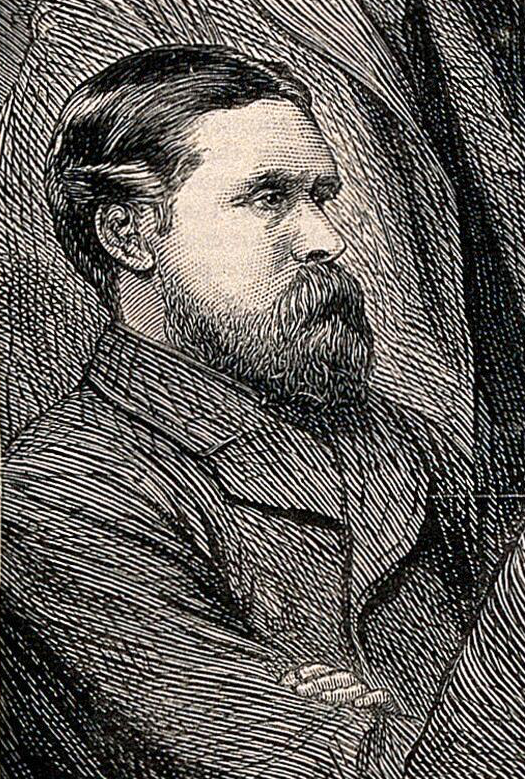
Godwin-Austen depicted for his role as President of the Geography Department of the British Association for the Advancement of Science, 1883

Godwin-Austen produced numerous research articles on the terrestrial molluscs that he had collected in India. He sold this collection to the British Museum, but parts were loaned back in turn for him to work on, besides which he visited the museum regularly to catalogue both his own and others' collections from India (work for which he was paid). He had also sold this museum his collection of birds, about 3,500 skins collected in Manipur and Assam. Unlike most contemporary malacologists, he described not just the shells but also the internal anatomy and radula teeth, which often better distinguish species and more reliably assign them to families. He took over the authorship of the first volume of the Fauna of British India devoted to terrestrial molluscs, but he was subsequently replaced by G.K. Gude, who could work faster because his descriptions were more superficial. Instead Godwin-Austen chose to work on his own at his own pace, publishing most of his results in The Land and Freshwater Mollusca of India, appearing in 13 parts from 1882 to 1920. This research brought him recognition, and he served as president of the Malacological Society of London (1897–1899), president of the Conchological Society of Great Britain and Ireland (1908–1909) and vice president of the Zoological Society of London (1895). In 1880 he had been elected a Fellow of the Royal Society and in 1910 he received the Founder's Medal of the Royal Geographical Society.

He died on 2 December 1923 at Nore, looked after in the last 10 years of his life by his sister Beatrice.

== Buddhism ==
Family tradition holds that Haversham Godwin-Austen was a convert to the Buddhist faith (following a self-attested period as an at least nominal Muslim in the middle to late 1850s), and as such he may be the first known British adherent to Buddhism. His small Burmese-style Buddhist shrine at Nore, Hascombe, Surrey, is likely to have been erected there around 1901 (although a later date of c. 1920 is possible), perhaps after being situated at each of Godwin-Austen's successive main residences from 1877 onwards, following his return to England after 25 years in Asia. Accordingly, the shrine probably constitutes the first ever custom-built physical structure raised for Buddhist devotional purposes in Britain. It was forgotten and lost to view under brambles after Godwin-Austen's time, prior to rediscovery in 1962 by a new owner of Nore, actor Dirk Bogarde.

Godwin-Austen's conversion – and possibly his shrine – therefore predates the earliest formal Buddhist missions to Britain: namely, those of the Japanese-sponsored 'Buddhist Propagation Society', led by Irish-born Captain Charles J. W. Pfoundes in 1889, and that of English convert Charles Henry Allan Bennett, also known as 'Ananda Metteyya', in 1908. 'The Buddhist Society of Great Britain & Ireland' was formed in 1907.

== Legacy ==
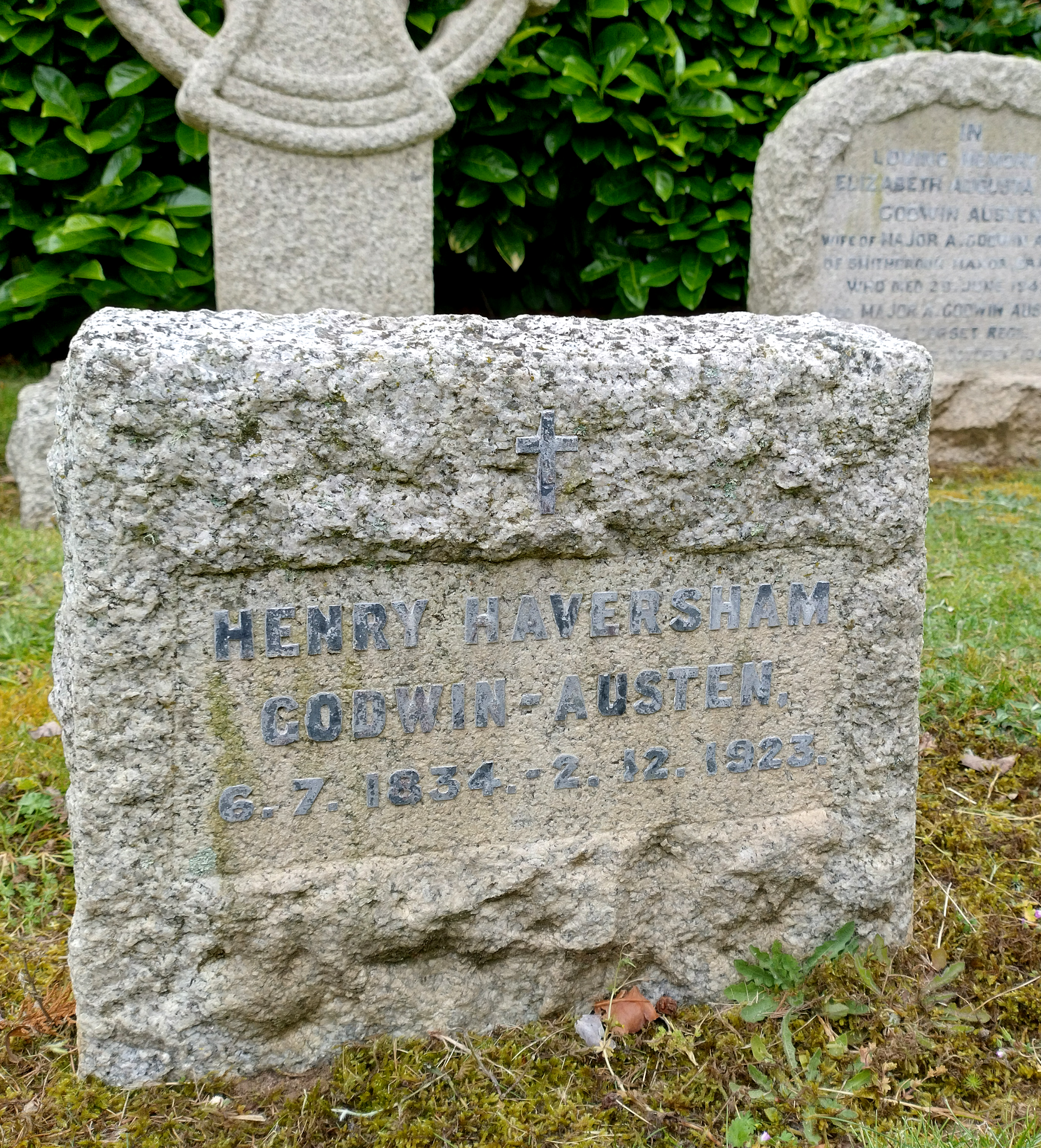
Gravestone in the family plot in Shalford Cemetery, near Guildford, UK

The second-highest mountain in the world, the Karakoram peak K2 in the Himalayas, was at one time proposed to be named after him to commemorate his exploration of the region. The proposal was rejected due to the general principle that personal names were unsuitable for Himalayan summits. However, Godwin-Austen's name is found on some maps, including the Times Mid-Century Atlas (1959). The Godwin-Austen Glacier was also named in his honour.

Godwin-Austen "stands out as by far the most important investigator of Indian Mollusca." His The land and freshwater molluscs of India has been described as "an epoch-making work on Indian land molluscs, also indispensable in the study of all Oriental and Ethiopian faunas." The mollusc genera Austenia G. Nevill, 1878, Godwinia Sykes, 1900, and several Indian species have been named in his honour. Godwin-Austen is also commemorated in the scientific names of two species of lizards: Pachydactylus austeni and Pseudocalotes austeniana.

His son R.A. Godwin-Austen was also a career army officer and was later a supporter of the "saintly mafia" called Ferguson's Gang, dedicated to saving historically important buildings. H. H. Godwin-Austen's nephew, General Sir Alfred Godwin-Austen (1889–1963), was a divisional commander of the East African and Western Desert campaigns during the Second World War.

Godwin-Austen's son by Kudidje, Edward, who had been adopted by a family named Milner, became a civil engineer in Hyderabad State and elsewhere. In 1879 he married Emma Theresa Smith, and they had fifteen children. Edward Henry Hastings Milner died in Bombay in 1917, aged only 59, but his widow lived until 1958.

== Selected publications ==
- Notes on the Pangong Lake District of Ladakh (1864)
- Birds of Assam (1870–1878)
- Land and freshwater mollusca of India, including South Arabia, Baluchistan, Afghanistan, Kashmir, Nepal, Burma, Pegu, Tenasserim, Malaya Peninsula, Ceylon and other islands of the Indian Ocean; Supplementary to Masers Theobald and Hanley's Conchologica Indica (Taylor and Francis, London, VI+257+ 442+65 pp., 165 pls, published in parts, 1882–1920:
  - Volume 1 + plates; 1882: pp. I–VI, 1–66, pls. 1–12; 1883: pp. 67–164, pls. 13–42; 1884: pls. 43–51; 1886: pp. 165–206; 1887: pls. 52–62; 1888: pp. 207–257 (as Volume I, 1889)
  - volume 2 + plates; 1897: pp. 1–46, pls. 63–69; 1898: pp. 47–86, pls. 70–82; 1899: pp. 87–146, pls. 83–100; 1907: pp. 147–238, pls. 101–117; 1910: pp. 239–310, pls. 118–132; 1914: pp. 311–442, pls. 133–158; (as Volume II, 1914)
  - volume 3 + plates: 1920: pp. 1–65, pls. 159–165; (as Volume III, 1920)
- Blanford W. T. & Godwin-Austen H. H. 1908. Mollusca. Testacellidae and Zonitidae The Fauna of British India, including Burma and Ceylon

== Bibliography ==
- Moorehead, Catherine (2013). The K2 man (and his molluscs): the extraordinary life of Haversham Godwin-Austen. Neil Wilson Publishing. p. 365. ISBN 978-1906000608.
