= Godwinia =

Scientific classification
- Kingdom: Animalia
- Phylum: Mollusca
- Class: Gastropoda
- Order: Stylommatophora
- Family: Oxychilidae
- Subfamily: Godwiniinae
- Genus: Godwinia; Sykes, 1900

Genus of gastropods

Godwinia is a genus of air-breathing land snails, terrestrial gastropod mollusks in the family Oxychilidae.

Godwinia is the type genus of the subfamily Godwiniinae.

== Distribution ==
This genus is endemic to Hawaii.

== Species ==
Species within the genus Godwinia include:

- Godwinia caperata (Gould, 1864)
- Godwinia haupuensis (C. M. Cooke, 1921)
- Godwinia newcombi (Reeve, 1854)
