= Samuel Edmund Waller =

English painter (1850-1903)

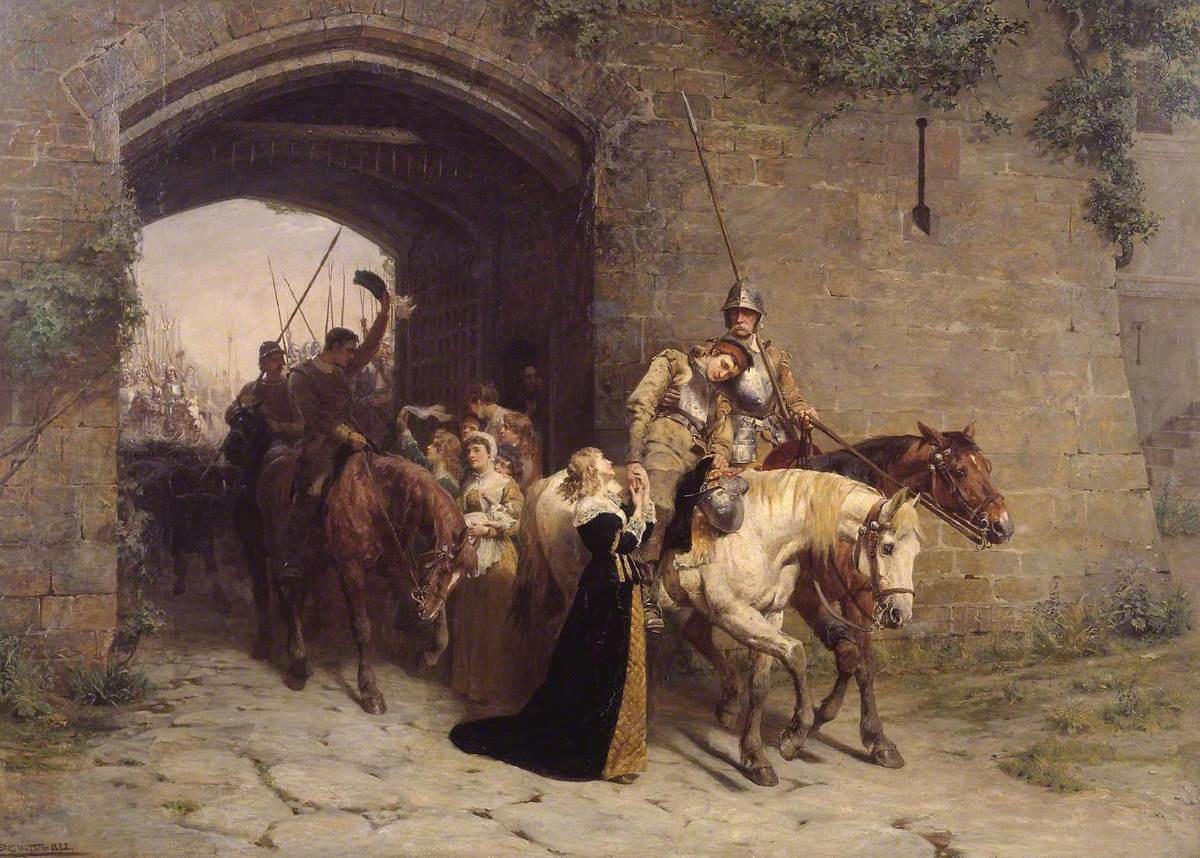
Sweethearts and Wives, 1882

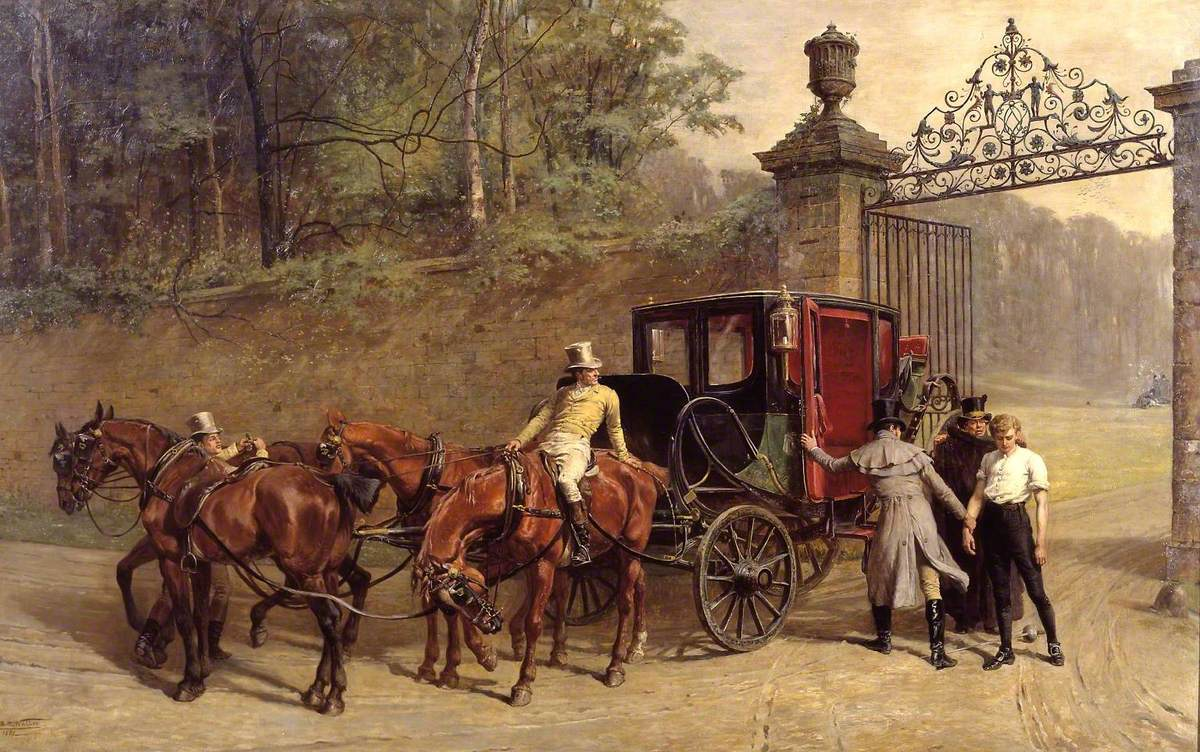
Success 1881

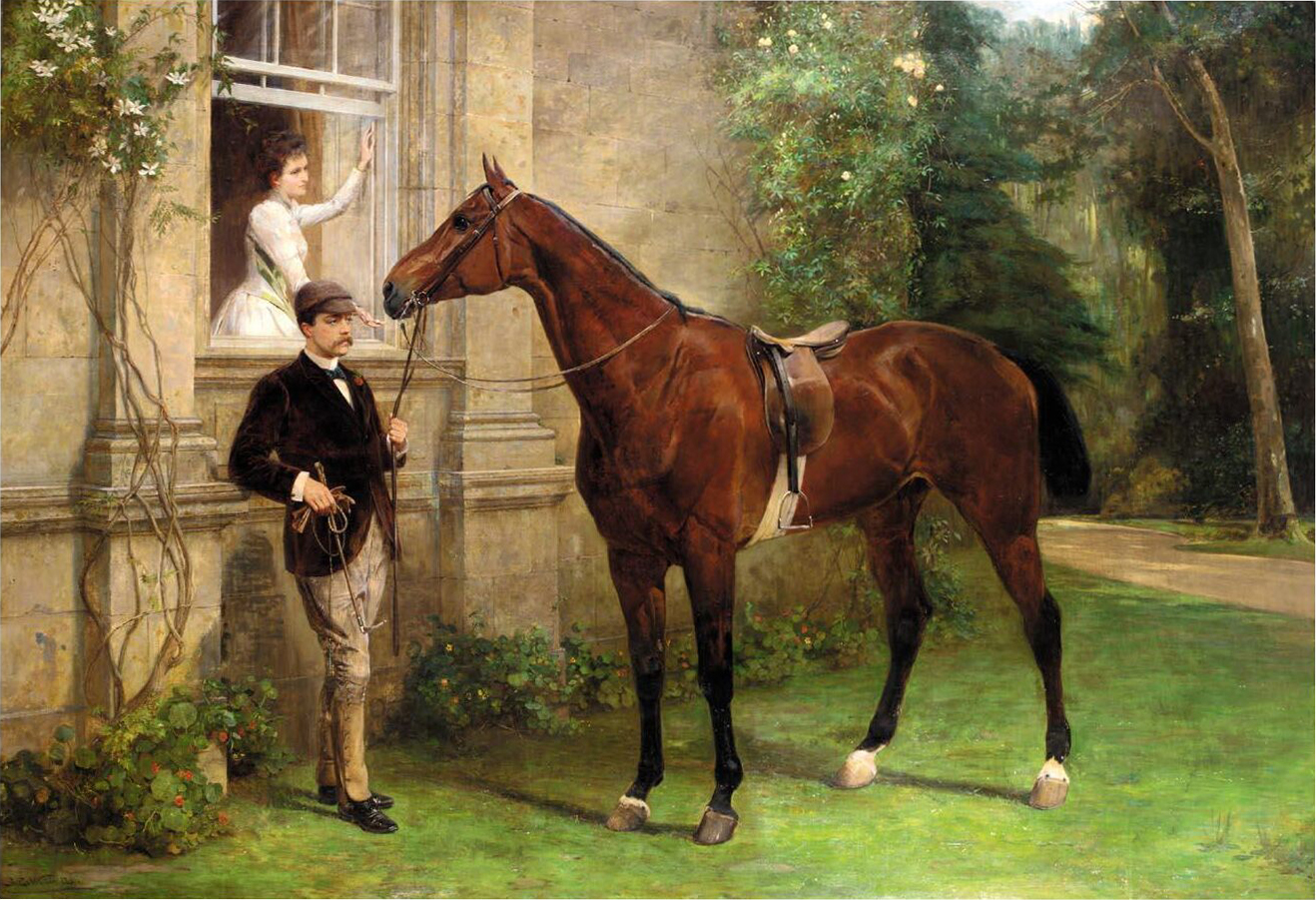
Before the morning ride, 1891

Samuel Edmund Waller (18 June 1850 – 14 June 1903) was an English painter of genre pictures.

== Biography ==
Waller, was born at the Spa, Gloucester, on 18 June 1850, to Frederick Sandham Waller, and his wife Anne Elizabeth Hitch. His father, was an architect practising in Gloucester, who ably restored considerable portions of Gloucester Cathedral in perfect harmony with the original design. Young Waller, was educated at Cheltenham College with a view to the army, but showing artistic inclinations was sent to the Gloucester School of Art, and later went through a course of architectural studies in his father's office. This training proved of service to him, for many of his pictures have architectural backgrounds. At eighteen he entered the Royal Academy Schools, and three years later (1871) he exhibited his first pictures at Burlington House entitled A Winter's Tale and The Illustrious Stranger.

In 1872 he went to Iceland, and published an illustrated account in 1874 of his travels entitled Six Weeks in the Saddle .

In 1873 he joined the staff of The Graphic. The following year he appeared at the Royal Academy with a work called Soldiers of Fortune, and henceforward was a steady exhibitor there until 1902. His chief and best-known pictures were Jealous (1875), now in the National Gallery, Melbourne; The Way of the World (1876), Home? (1877), now in the Art Gallery of New South Wales; The Empty Saddle (1879), with an architectural setting taken from Burford Priory, Oxfordshire; Success! (1881), and Sweethearts and Wives (1882), are both held by the Tate Gallery. Later works include The Day of Reckoning (1883), Peril (1886), The Morning of Agincourt (1888), In his Father's Footsteps (1889), Dawn (1890), One-and-Twenty (1891), The Ruined Sanctuary (1892), Alone! (1896), Safe (1898), My Hero (1902).

Old English country life strongly attracted his imagination, and furnished him with the romantic incidents which formed the subjects of his most notable pictures, and their backgrounds were frequently taken from Elizabethan houses in his native county or elsewhere in England.

Many of his pictures are well known as reproductions and engravings throughout the English-speaking world. The originals are in many cases in private ownership in America and Australia as well as in England. Waller's great knowledge of horses and his skill in representing them gave his work much vogue among sportsmen. He took great pains in studying animals, and related some of his experiences in articles contributed to the 'Art Journal' (1893-6). His pictures usually tell a story effectively and dramatically, and has been described as both a Victorian and a narrative artist.

He died at his studio, Haverstock Hill, London, on 9 June 1903, after a long illness, and was buried at Golders Green. He married in 1874 Mary Lemon Fowler, daughter of the Rev. Hugh Fowler of Barnwood, Gloucestershire. His widow, a well-known artist, who often painted pictures of children, also exhibited at the Royal Academy from 1877 to 1904. She died in 1931 and was survived by the couple's son by just one year.
