= Second Anglo-Burmese War =

1852–1853 war in Southeast Asia

Second Anglo-Burmese War ဒုတိယအင်္ဂလိပ်-မြန်မာစစ်
- Part of Anglo-Burmese Wars
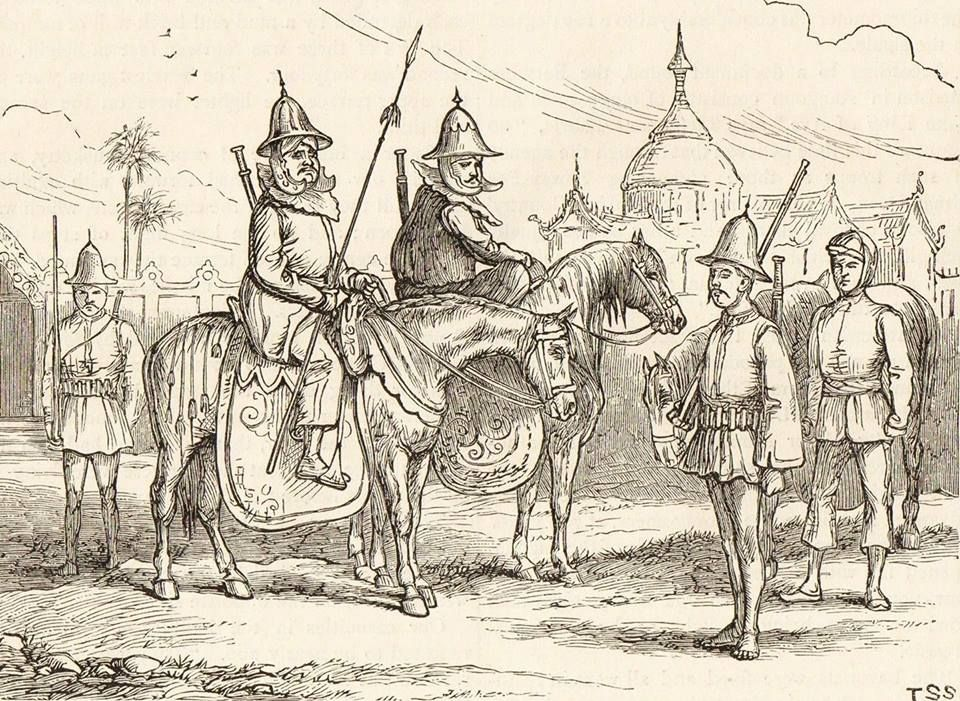
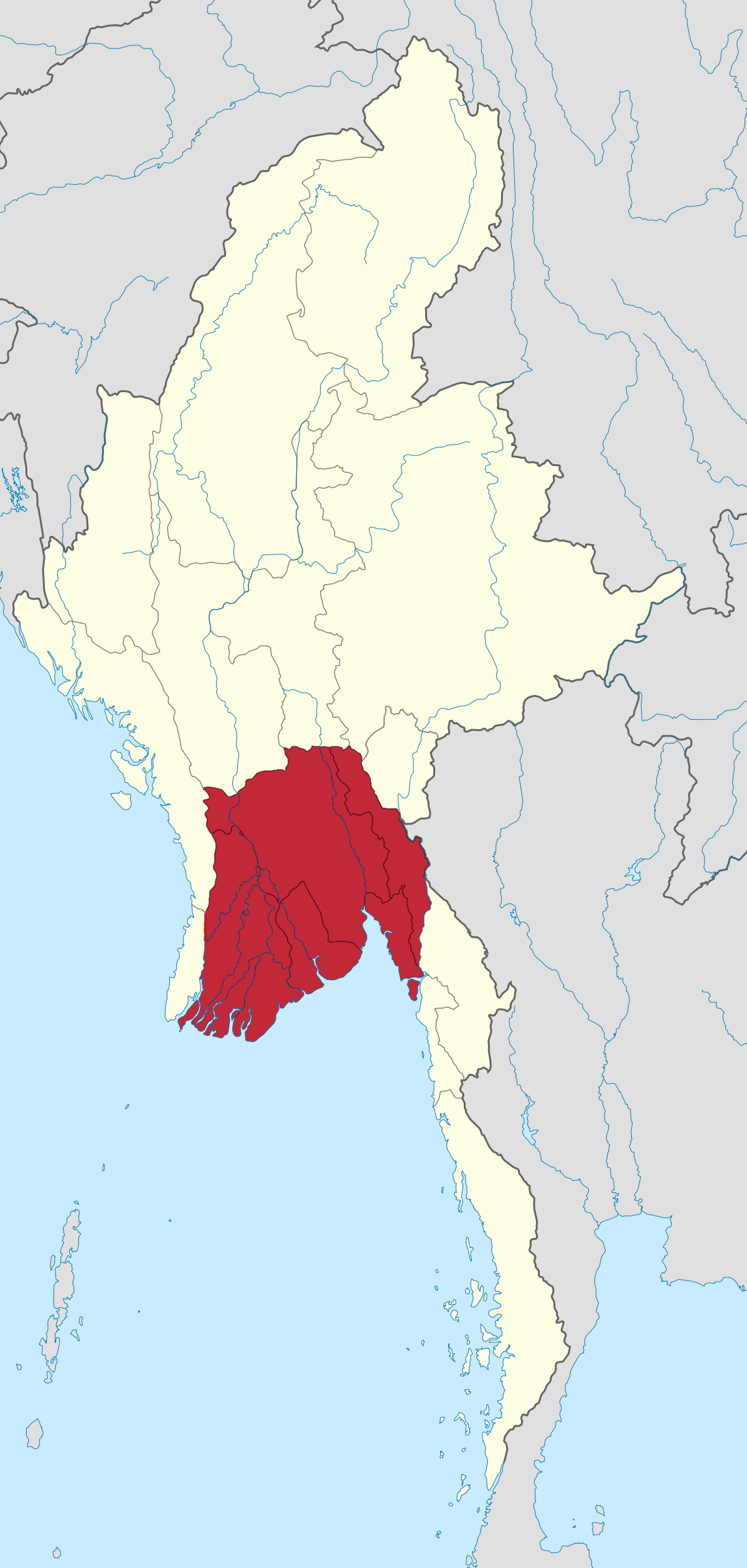
- Royal Burmese troops who were fighting in the Second Anglo-Burmese War in 1852 (top); The territories in Lower Burma that were annexed into Bengal Presidency in 1853 (bottom)
Date	5 April 1852 – 20 January 1853 (9 months, 2 weeks, and 2 days)
Location	Lower Burma
Result	British victory Pagan Min was deposed in a coup by Mindon Min
Territorial changes	British East India Company takes control of Lower Burma

Belligerents
British Empire: East India Company	Burma

Commanders and leaders
(United Kingdom of Great Britain and Ireland) Garnet Wolseley; (United Kingdom of Great Britain and Ireland) George Lambert; (East India Company) Henry Godwin	(Konbaung dynasty) Pagan Min; (Konbaung dynasty) Maung Gyi; (Konbaung dynasty) Kyauk Lon

The Second Anglo-Burmese War or the Second Burma War (Burmese: ဒုတိယအင်္ဂလိပ်-မြန်မာစစ် [dṵtḭja̰ ɪ́ɰ̃ɡəleɪʔ mjəmà sɪʔ]; 5 April 1852 – 20 January 1853) was the second of the three wars fought between the Burmese Empire and British Empire during the 19th century. The war resulted in a British victory with more Burmese territory being annexed to British India.

== Background ==
In 1852, Commodore George Lambert was dispatched to Burma by Lord Dalhousie over a number of minor issues related to the Treaty of Yandabo between the countries. The Burmese immediately made concessions including the removal of a governor whom the Company made their casus belli. Lambert, described by Dalhousie in a private letter as the "combustible commodore", eventually provoked a naval confrontation in extremely questionable circumstances by blockading the port of Rangoon and seizing the King Pagan's royal ship thus leading to the war.

The nature of the dispute was misrepresented to Parliament, and Parliament played a role in further "suppressing" the facts released to the public, but most of the facts were established by comparative reading of these conflicting accounts in what was originally an anonymous pamphlet, How Wars are Got Up In India; this account by Richard Cobden remains almost the sole contemporaneous evidence as to who actually made the decision to invade and annex Burma.

Richard Cobden made a scathing attack on Dalhousie for despatching a naval commodore to negotiate (gunboat diplomacy) and for raising the initial demand for compensation of £1000 to 100 times that amount, £100,000. He also criticised Dalhousie for choosing Lambert over Colonel Archibald Bogle, the British Commissioner of Tenasserim, who was much more experienced in Burmese social and diplomatic affairs. Dalhousie denied that Lambert was the cause of the eruption of hostilities.

== War ==
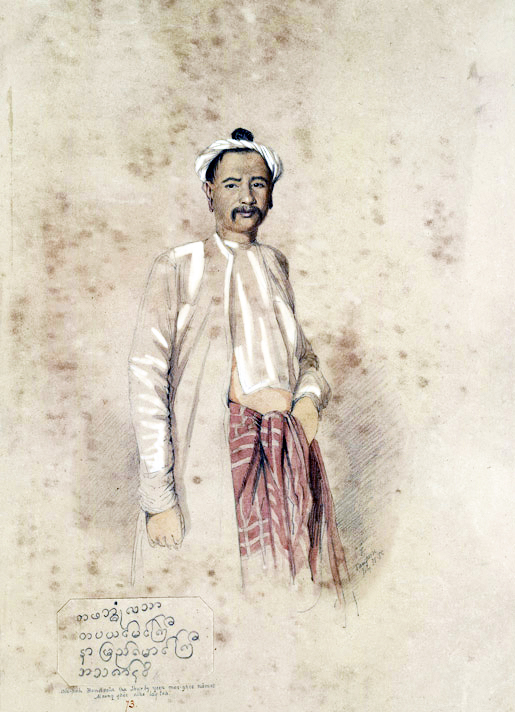
Maung Gyi, Lord of Dabayin

The first substantial blow of the Second Anglo-Burmese War was struck by the Company on 5 April 1852, when the port of Martaban was taken. Rangoon was occupied on 12 April, and then the Shwedagon Pagoda was bombarded by artillery and taken on 14 April; after heavy fighting, the Burmese army retired northwards. Bassein was seized on 19 May, and Pegu was taken on 3 June, after some sharp fighting round the Shwemawdaw Pagoda. During the rainy season the approval of the British East India Company's court of directors and of the British government was obtained as to the annexation of the lower portion of the Irrawaddy River Valley, including Prome. After the fighting had concluded, several Burmese pagodas throughout the Empire were sacked.

Lord Dalhousie visited Rangoon in July and August, and discussed the whole situation with the civil, military and naval authorities. He decided that dictating terms to the Court of Ava by marching to the capital was not how the war should be conducted unless complete annexation of the kingdom was contemplated and this was deemed unachievable in both military and economic terms for the time being. As a consequence, Major-General Godwin occupied Prome on 9 October, encountering only slight resistance from the Burmese forces under the command of Lord Dabayin, son of Gen. Maha Bandula, who was killed in the First Anglo-Burmese War, though bitterly so, as the Major-General resented having to deal with the Royal Navy under the command of Lambert, a mere commodore, after the death of Rear Admiral Charles Austen, the brother of the writer Jane Austen. Early in December Lord Dalhousie informed King Pagan that the province of Pegu would henceforth form part of the Company dominions.

== Aftermath ==
The proclamation of annexation was issued on 20 January 1853, and thus the Second Anglo-Burmese War was brought to an end without any treaty being signed. The war resulted in a revolution in Amarapura although it was then still called the Court of Ava, with Pagan Min (1846–1852) being overthrown by his half brother Mindon Min (1853–1878). Mindon immediately sued for peace but the two Italian priests he sent to negotiate found the British 50 miles (80 km) farther north at Myedè with a rich belt of the Ningyan teak forests already staked out within their territory and presented as a fait accompli. No treaty was ever signed although trade resumed between Company Burma and the Kingdom of Ava until fresh hostilities broke out in 1885–1886.

== See also ==
- History of Burma
- Konbaung dynasty
- First Anglo-Burmese War (1824–1826)
- Third Anglo-Burmese War (1885)
