= Daphla Hills =

Daphla (or Dafla) Hills is a tract of hilly country on the border of western Arunachal and Assam occupied by an independent tribe called Daphla. It lies to the north of the Tezpur and North Lakhimpur subdivisions, and is bounded on the west by the Aka Hills and on the east by the Abor Range. In 1872 a party of independent Daphlas suddenly attacked a colony of their own tribesmen, who had settled at Amtola in British territory, and carried away 44 captives to the hills. This led to the Daphla expedition of 1874, when a force of 1,000 troops secured the release of the prisoners and reduced the tribe to submission.

== See also ==
- 1953 Achingmori incident
