= Colvin (surname) =

Colvin is a surname. Notable people with the surname include:

- Addison B. Colvin (1858–1939), American businessman, banker and politician
- Andrew Colvin, Australian police commissioner
- Andrew J. Colvin (1808–1889), American lawyer and politician from New York
- Bobby Colvin (1876–1940), Scottish footballer
- Brock Colvin (born c. 1995), American politician from Alabama
- Clare Colvin, British writer, daughter of Ian Colvin
- Claudette Colvin (1939–2026), American activist for African American rights
- D. Leigh Colvin (1880–1959), American politician, active in the temperance movement
- Dora Colvin, American trucker
- Douglas Glenn Colvin (1951–2002), real name of American musician Dee Dee Ramone
- Edwin A. Colvin (1927–2015), American politician
- Elliott Colvin (died 1883) (1836–1883), British Commissioner in Meerut
- Elliot Colvin (died 1940) (1861–1940), British civil servant
- Elliot James Dowell Colvin (1885–1950), British Indian Army officer
- Fred H. Colvin (1867–1965), American machinist and writer
- Harvey Doolittle Colvin (1815–1892), American politician
- Holly Colvin (born 1989), English cricketer
- Howard Colvin (1919–2007), British architectural historian and writer
- Hugh Colvin (1887–1962), British soldier
- Ian Colvin (1877–1938), British journalist
- Irene Colvin Corbett (1881–1912), American nurse and musician who died on the Titanic
- Jack Colvin (1934–2005), American actor
- James Colvin (1844–1919), New Zealand politician
- James Colvin (pseudonym), pseudonym used by Michael Moorcock
- James Morris Colquhoun Colvin (1870–1945), British Army officer
- Jim Colvin (1937–2019), American football player
- John Colvin (diplomat) (1922–2003), British diplomat and spy
- John Colvin (engineer) (1794–1871), built canals in northern India
- John O. Colvin (1946–2024), American judge
- John Russell Colvin (1807–1857), British administrator in India, and his sons:

- Sir Auckland Colvin (1838–1908), British civil servant; founder of Colvin Taluqdars' College
- Walter Mytton Colvin (1847–1908), British colonial administrator

- Kathryn Colvin (born 1945), British diplomat
- Marie Colvin (1957–2012), American journalist
- Mark Colvin (1952–2017), Australian broadcaster
- Mary Colvin (1907–1988), director of the British Women's Royal Army Corps
- Michael Colvin (1932–2000), British politician
- Mike Colvin, American politician
- Monty Colvin, American musician in the band Galactic Cowboys
- Sir Ragnar Colvin (1882–1954), British and Australian admiral
- Richard Colvin (UK MP) (1856–1936), British politician
- Richard Colvin (diplomat) (born 1969), British-born Canadian diplomat
- Rosevelt Colvin (born 1977), American football player
- Ruth Johnson Colvin (1916–2024), American philanthropist
- Sarah Colvin (born 1967), British scholar of German, literary theory, and gender studies
- Sarah Tarleton Colvin (1865–1949), American nurse and activist
- Shawn Colvin (born 1956), American musician
- Sir Sidney Colvin (1845–1927), British critic, curator, and friend of Robert Louis Stevenson
- Verplanck Colvin (1847–1920), American surveyor and champion of the Adirondacks

== See also ==
- Colvin G. Butler (1872–1961), American farmer, Presbyterian clergyman, and politician
- Colvin family, Anglo-Indian administrators and soldiers
