= John Colvin (diplomat) =

British diplomat, sailor, intelligence officer, banker and military historian

John Horace Ragnar Colvin, CMG (18 June 1922 – 4 October 2003) was a British sailor, intelligence officer, banker and military historian.

== Family ==
The Colvin family had a long history of service to Queen and country, both in the military and administration. John Horace Ragnar Colvin was the son of Admiral Sir Ragnar Colvin; the grandson of Clement Sneyd Colvin; and the great-grandson of John Russell Colvin, lieutenant-governor of the North-West Provinces of British India during the mutiny of 1857, who had ten children and founded a dynasty of Empire-builders. Relatives included Walter Mytton and Auckland, also lieutenant-governor of the North-West Provinces and Oudh. Brenda Colvin (1897–1981) was an important landscape architect, author of standard works in the field and a force behind its professionalisation. Sidney Colvin was a critic, curator, and great friend of Robert Louis Stevenson.

Colvin married twice. His first marriage was to Anne Manifold in 1948, which ended in 1963. His second was to Moranna Cazenove in 1967. Each marriage produced a son and a daughter..

His former wife Anne later married Admiral Sir Anthony Synnot, a senior officer in the Royal Australian Navy, and became Lady Synnot.

One of Colvin's children (with Anne) was Mark Colvin, a hugely influential and much loved Australian journalist. Mark wrote of his father's career in his 2016 book Light and Shadow: Memoirs of a Spy's Son.

== Career ==
He was educated at the Royal Naval College, Dartmouth, and passed into the Royal Navy in the early part of the Second World War.

During the War, he served mostly in South-East Asia. Among other exploits, he joined combined operations in Colombo, and served behind Japanese lines in Vietnam. He emerged from undercover work to accept the surrender of the Japanese command in Saigon on Japan's capitulation, and remained in the South Vietnamese capital for a year.

After leaving the Royal Navy with the rank of lieutenant commander, Colvin studied at the School of Slavonic and East European Studies in London and joined the Secret Intelligence Service. He was posted to a number of Cold War hotspots including Oslo, Vienna and Kuala Lumpur. His most high-profile postings, however, were Consul-General in Hanoi from 1966 to 1967 at the height of the American bombing campaign in the Vietnam War, where he was succeeded by Brian Stewart; HM Ambassador to Mongolia from 1971 to 1974; and head of the SIS station in Washington 1977–1980. He was appointed a Companion of the Order of St Michael and St George in 1968 following his return from Hanoi.

On retirement from SIS, Colvin advised David Rockefeller for eight years in Hong Kong as a vice-president of the Chase Manhattan Bank. He retired to London in 1988.

Colvin wrote military history. His best-selling works were Not Ordinary Men, which examined the Battle of Kohima, and Decisive Battles, which looked at twenty crucial battles throughout history. He also published a memoir of his time in Hanoi and Ulaanbaatar called Twice Around the World.

== Personal life ==
Colvin was an active member of several of London's gentlemen's clubs, the St James's Club, Brooks's, the Beefsteak, as well as, latterly, the Academy Club.

== Selected publications ==
- Twice Around the World: Some Memoirs of Diplomatic Life in North Vietnam and Outer Mongolia. London: Leo Cooper, 1991. ISBN 0850522897 OCLC 27727233
- Not Ordinary Men: The Story of the Battle of Kohima. London: L. Cooper, 1994. Heavily reprinted.
- Volcano Under Snow: Vo Nguyen Giap. London: Quartet Books, 1996. ISBN 0704371006 OCLC 34626596
- Nomonhan. London: Quartet Books, 1999. ISBN 070437112X OCLC 41605113
- Decisive Battles: Over 20 Key Naval and Military Encounters from 480 BC to 1943. London: Headline, 2003. ISBN 0755310705 OCLC 56464280
