= Ragnar Colvin =

Royal Navy Admiral (1882–1954)

Admiral Sir Ragnar Colvin KBE CB
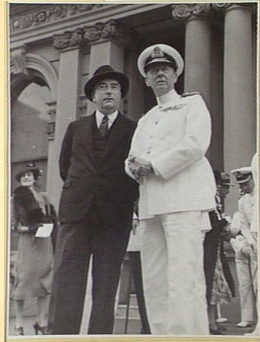
- Robert Menzies and Admiral Ragnar Colvin at HMAS Perth march, 1940
- Born: 7 May 1882; Whitehall, London
- Died: 22 February 1954 (aged 71); Royal Hospital Haslar, Hampshire
- Military career
- Allegiance: United Kingdom
- Branch: Royal Navy
- Service years: 1896–1944
- Rank: Admiral
- Commands: Chief of the Australian Naval Staff (1937–41); Royal Naval College, Greenwich (1934–37); 2nd Battle Squadron (1932–33); HMS Revenge (1924–25); HMS Caradoc (1919–21)
- Conflicts: First World War; Second World War
- Awards: Knight Commander of the Order of the British Empire; Companion of the Order of the Bath

Admiral Sir Ragnar Musgrave Colvin, KBE, CB (7 May 1882 – 22 February 1954) was a long-serving Royal Navy officer who commanded the Royal Australian Navy (RAN) at the outbreak of the Second World War.

== Early life and background ==
Colvin was the son of Clement Sneyd Colvin and his wife Alice Jane, née Lethbridge. This connected him with a long and illustrious line of British Empire soldiers and administrators, the Colvin family; his grandfather was John Russell Colvin, lieutenant-governor of the North-West Provinces of British India during the mutiny of 1857. His uncles included Walter Mytton and Auckland, also lieutenant-governor of the North-West Provinces and Oudh. A first cousin, Brenda Colvin (1897–1981), was an important landscape architect, author of standard works in the field and a force behind its professionalization. A more distant cousin was Sidney Colvin, who grew up to be a critic, curator, and great friend of Robert Louis Stevenson.

== Naval career ==
Colvin joined the Royal Navy as a cadet in HMS Britannia in 1896. He was promoted to acting sub-lieutenant on 15 July 1901 and subsequently confirmed in that rank from the same date. The following year, he was in November 1902 posted to serve on HMS Foam, serving in the Mediterranean Fleet. He was commissioned lieutenant six years later and, after qualifying as a gunnery specialist in 1904, was promoted commander in 1913. In the First World War he served as executive officer in the cruiser HMS Hibernia, and in the battleship HMS Revenge in which he served in the Battle of Jutland in 1916. Promoted captain on 31 December 1917, he served in the Admiralty as assistant director of plans and was appointed a Commander of the Order of the British Empire.

After the war Colvin commanded the cruiser HMS Caradoc in the Black Sea and the Mediterranean and in 1922 to 1924 he was naval attaché in Tokyo. He re-joined HMS Revenge as flag captain to the Commander-in-Chief, Atlantic Fleet, and in 1927 became director of the Naval Tactical School, Portsmouth. Colvin was promoted rear admiral in 1929 and soon was appointed chief of staff to the commander-in-chief, Atlantic Fleet. In 1932 he was appointed a Companion of the Order of the Bath and became commander of the 2nd Battle Squadron. Promoted vice admiral in 1934, he became president of the Royal Naval College, Greenwich, and commander of the Royal Naval War College. He was appointed a Knight Commander of the Order of the Bath in 1937.

Colvin was appointed Chief of Naval Staff to the Royal Australian Navy in 1937. Under his leadership, the Royal Australian Navy expanded its naval fleet and maintained a high profile in Australia's military affairs.

At the outbreak of the Second World War, Colvin was an active participant in international planning; however, by 1940 his health was failing and he resigned the following year. Colvin returned to London where he served as Naval Advisor to the Australian High Commission from 1942 to 1944.

== Family ==
In 1918 he married Sibyl Kays. They had two children:

- John Horace Ragnar Colvin (18 June 1922 – 4 October 2003) HM Ambassador to Mongolia, 1971–1974, and spy with the Secret Intelligence Service (one child is Mark Colvin, an Australian journalist); and,
- Mrs. Prudence (Prue) Balfour (married in 1949 to Colin James Balfour, Commander, Royal Navy (1924 – 13 August 2009 aged 85), children Major General James Balfour CBE, b 1951, and Belinda.)

Military offices
Preceded by Sir Barry Domvile	President of the Royal Naval College, Greenwich; 1934–1937	Succeeded by Sir Sidney Bailey
Preceded by Sir George Hyde	First Naval Member and Chief of Staff; 1937–1941	Succeeded by Sir Guy Royle
