= Mark Colvin =

Australian journalist and radio and television presenter (1952–2017)

- Born: 13 March 1952; London, England, UK
- Died: 11 May 2017 (aged 65); Randwick, Sydney, Australia
- Parent: John Colvin (father)
- Presenting career
- Show: PM
- Station: Radio National
- Network: ABC Radio
- Style: News and current affairs
- Country: Australia
- Previous shows: As presenter: The World Today; As reporter: Four Corners; Foreign Correspondent; 7.30 Report; Lateline

Mark Colvin (13 March 1952 – 11 May 2017) was an Australian journalist and radio and television broadcaster for the Australian Broadcasting Corporation (ABC), and worked on most of the flagship current affairs programs. Notably, based in Sydney, he was the presenter of PM— the radio current affairs program on the ABC Radio network — from 1997 to 2017.

== Biography ==
=== Career as a journalist and broadcaster ===
Colvin graduated from Christ Church, Oxford University, with a Bachelor of Arts (Hons) in English literature and arrived in Australia in 1974. With no clear career ambitions and failing as a builder's labourer, being susceptible to heat stroke in the strong Australian sun, the dole office steered him toward journalism. In that year he commenced a traineeship with the ABC but had doubts during the year that he would stick with journalism. Nevertheless, in January 1975 he commenced at the ABC's rock music station Double Jay (2JJ, now known as Triple J) as one of the foundation staff, initially working as a cadet journalist. While at 2JJ, he presented news, conducted interviews, and produced current affairs and documentary specials until 1978. With strong foreign language skills in French, Italian and Spanish, he was posted to the Canberra bureau and was appointed a television news producer. A year later he was one of the first reporters on Nationwide, along with Jenny Brockie, Paul Murphy, and Andrew Olle.

In 1980, at the age of 28, Colvin was appointed foreign correspondent in London, and travelled to cover major stories, including the American hostage crisis in Tehran and the rise of Solidarity in Poland. During his time covering the Middle East, Colvin was deeply affected by the death of his interpreter, Bahram Dehqani-Tafti, a secular Iranian murdered and dumped outside a Tehran prison. Colvin believed that the mullahs had a dispute with Dehqani-Tafti's father, the Anglican bishop of Iran in exile in London.

Colvin returned to Australia in 1983 and was initially a reporter on both AM and PM, before agitating for the establishment of a midday news and current-affairs radio program. Colvin became the founding presenter of The World Today on ABC radio. The following year, Colvin went to Brussels as Europe correspondent, and covered the events across the continent as the Cold War began to thaw and the Gorbachev era started the process that would lead to the lifting of the Iron Curtain.

Between 1988 and 1992, Colvin was a reporter for Four Corners, making programs focused on, inter alia, the French massacre of Kanaks in New Caledonia, the extinction of Australia's fauna and the Cambodian peace process. His feature on the Ethiopian famine won a gold medal at the New York Film Festival and was runner-up for an International Emmy Award. In 1992, Colvin accepted another London posting, this time for television, mainly reporting for Foreign Correspondent, the 7.30 Report and Lateline. His language skills and long European experience paid off in stories such as his series on the relationship between Italian organised crime and government, which culminated in the trial of former Prime Minister Giulio Andreotti.

In 1994, Colvin was deployed by the 7.30 Report to Africa to cover the unfolding tragedy in Rwanda. Travelling via Zaire, he witnessed an extensive human tragedy, in which about a million refugees were living in camps with poor sanitation and hygiene, with cholera and dysentery commonplace. Colvin was diagnosed with granulomatosis with polyangiitis, a rare inflammation of blood vessels, which nearly killed him. After several months in hospital, during his convalescence he became aware of a side effect of the treatment—his hip joints collapsed and both hips had to be replaced. He spent the next 18 months in Europe.

In 1997, Colvin returned to Sydney and started in his role as presenter for ABC Radio's PM. In November 2017 Colvin was inducted into The Australian Media Hall of Fame.

=== Organ transplant ===
On 22 March 2013, Colvin received a kidney transplant from a living donor. Colvin, and the hospital and staff, allowed the process to be recorded for television.

In a televised interview on 1 May 2013, the living donor of Colvin's transplanted kidney was revealed to be Mary-Ellen Field, whom Colvin had met while reporting on victims of the News of the World/News International phone hacking scandal. Field had received unwanted notoriety after details of her working relationship with Elle Macpherson had been revealed through reporting of messages from Field's hacked phone, causing Macpherson to sack Field. It was revealed that Colvin and Field had established a correspondence after the interview, finally meeting in 2011; that Field had decided to become a donor before revealing this to her husband; that the pair had considered naming the kidney "Rupert" (after Rupert Murdoch, chairman and chief executive officer of News Corporation, the parent company of News International that owned News of the World); and, that Colvin had declared a conflict of interest to his employer and ceased reporting on Field.

During 2010, Colvin worked to raise the profile of organ donation through interviews with a number of media agencies including The Sydney Morning Herald, The Australian, The Drum, The 7.30 Report, and Life Matters.

=== Stage play ===
The story of Colvin's kidney donation and the circumstances surrounding it was the subject of a stage play titled Mark Colvin's Kidney by playwright Tommy Murphy. The play was produced by the Sydney theatre company Belvoir with David Berthold as director, and a cast including actor John Howard as Colvin and Sarah Peirse as Mary-Ellen Field.

=== Autobiography ===
In 2016 Colvin released his autobiography, Light and Shadow: Memoirs of a Spy's Son.

== Family ==
The Colvin family had a long history of military and administrative service to Australia, and previously to the British Empire. Colvin's father, John Horace Ragnar Colvin, was a Cold War diplomat, and the grandson of Admiral Sir Ragnar Colvin. He is the great-grandson of the India Office mandarin Clement Sneyd Colvin, whose father was John Russell Colvin. John Russell, son of an East Indies trader, ended up lieutenant-governor of the North-West Provinces of British India during the mutiny of 1857, had ten children and founded a dynasty of Empire-builders. Through this line, Mark Colvin's extended family includes Walter Mytton, Auckland Colvin, also lieutenant-governor of the North-West Provinces and Oudh; the landscape architect Brenda Colvin (1897–1981), and Sidney Colvin, a critic, curator, and great friend of Robert Louis Stevenson.

Through his mother, Elizabeth Anne Manifold, Colvin was the great-great-nephew of a Prime Minister of Australia, Viscount Bruce of Melbourne, who went on to be an international statesman and the first Chancellor of the Australian National University. He was also the step-son of Admiral Sir Anthony Synnot. Colvin was married twice. He married his second wife, Michele Francesca McKenzie, in 1987. McKenzie is the mother of his two sons, Nicolas and William.

== Death ==
On 11 May 2017, Colvin died aged 65, at the Prince of Wales Hospital in Randwick, over twenty years after contracting granulomatosis with polyangiitis, the rare auto-immune condition which caused kidney failure in 2011. Colvin survived the kidney transplant only to be diagnosed with melanoma and then just before Easter in 2017 was diagnosed with inoperable lung cancer. He asked that anyone wishing to mark his death or honour his passing donate to the Prince of Wales Hospital Foundation.
