= Colvin family =

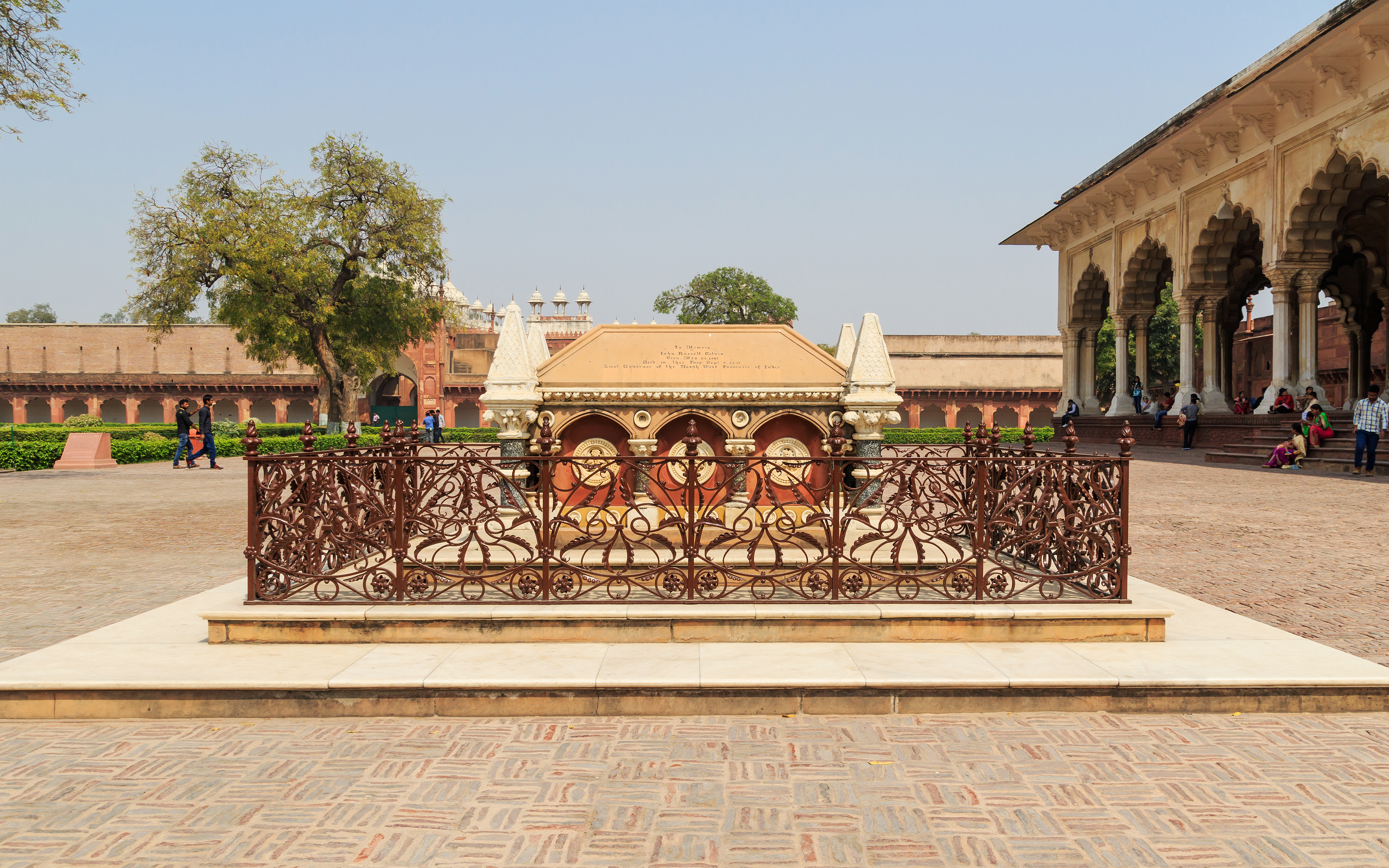
Tomb of John Russell Colvin inside the Red Fort of Agra.

Colvin family memorial in the chancel of All Saints church, Little Bealings, Suffolk

The Colvin family is the family descended from James Colquhoun Colvin (1767–1847), the son of Alexander Colvin (1718–1791) and Elizabeth 'Bettie' née Kennedy (1714–1795). James was a merchant trading between London and Calcutta during the East India Company. This Anglo-Indian family was intimately involved with the British Raj, first as traders and then as administrators and soldiers. Their descendants continued in service to the British Empire and later in some of its constituent countries.

== First generation ==
In 1802 James married Maria Jackson (1780–1834) at Fort William, India. Among their children were:

- Elizabeth Jackson Colvin (1803–1856) who married her cousin Alexander Colvin (1787–1864)
- Anna Maria Colvin (1804–1867) who married Robert David Colquhoun (1786–1838)
- Bazett David Colvin JP (1805–1871) see below
- John Russell Colvin (1807–1857) see below
- Binny James Colvin (1809–1895) who married Helen Catherine née Best (1818–1910) daughter of John Rycroft Best of Barbados
- Henrietta Hall Colvin (1812–1841) who married Rev. Ellis Walford (1803–1881)
- James Edward Colvin (1814–1814)
- Edward Thomas Colvin (1815–1857) who married Mary Anne Browne (1822–1877) daughter of Dr John Browne, Surgeon General in the Bengal Medical Service
- Margaret Matilda Colvin (1817–1894) who married Walker Pitcairn (1808–1857)

Maria's eldest sister had married a Thomas Binny, who had traded at Madras and retired to St Andrews, Scotland. It was in their household that Bazett, John, and Binny Colvin passed their childhood.

== Bazett David Colvin and his children ==
Bazett David Colvin (1805–1871) was the eldest son of James.

In 1840 Bazett married Mary Steuart née Bayley (1820–1902) the daughter of William Butterworth Bayley a director and chairman of the British East India Company from 1834 to 1858. Among their children were:

- Lt Col William Butterworth Colvin (1840–1883), commanding officer of the 2nd Battalion the Royal Fusiliers from 1881 until his death at Bellary in 1883.
- Bazett David Colvin MA (1842–1924) who migrated to Australia and married a widow Jessie Stanley Phipps née Tomlins (1859–1924)
- Robert Colquhoun Colvin (1844–1844)
- Prof Sir Sidney Colvin MA LLD (1845–1927) - critic, curator, and great friend of Robert Louis Stevenson.
- Maria Colvin (1846–1847)
- Agnes Colvin (1849–1849)
- Caroline Louisa Colvin (1852–1852)

In 1847 he inherited his father's estate at The Grove, Little Bealing, near Ipswich.

== John Russell Colvin and his children ==
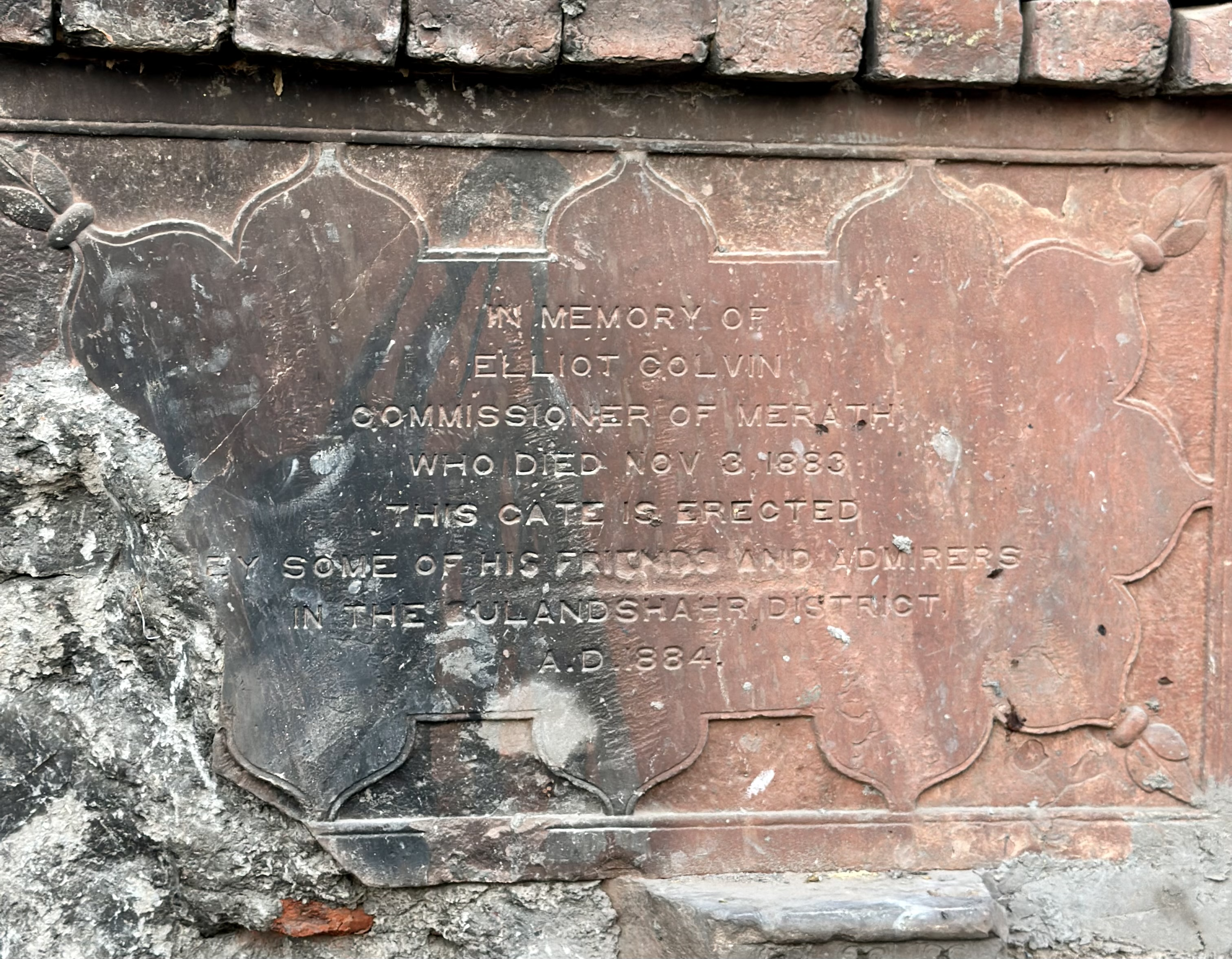
Colvin memorial gate, Bulandshahr: named for Elliot Colvin

John Russell Colvin (1807 – 1857), the second son of James, rose to be lieutenant-governor of the North-West Provinces of British India during the mutiny of 1857, at the height of which he died.

He married Emma Sophia, daughter of Wetenhall Sneyd, a vicar in England; they had ten children, many of whom continued the family connection with India.

- James Henry Bayley Colvin (1828–1879), of the Bengal Civil Service.
- Bazett Wetenhall Colvin (1830–1909) who married Mary Elizabeth née Graham (1839–1916) daughter of Major-General Joseph Graham (1799–1880)
- Russell Pakenham Colvin (1834–1892) who married Emily Mary née Mitford (1844–1916), widow of Bernard Augustus Hewitt
- Elliott Graham Colvin (1836–1883) who married Edith née Cunningham (1846–1914)
- Sir Auckland Colvin (1838–1908) who married Charlotte Elizabeth née Herbert (1838–1865)
- Emma Colvin (1840–1877) who married Col George Falconer Pearson (1826–1923)
- Maria Worsley Colvin (1841–1869) who married Rev. Simon James Gordon Fraser (1825–1904)
- Clement Sneyd Colvin (1844–1901) who married Alice Jane née Lethbridge (1850–1885)
- Constance Colvin (1845–1902)
- Sir Walter Mytton Colvin (1847–1908) Barrister at Law, who married Annie née Money (1847–1908)

Bazett Wetenhall, Elliott Graham Colvin, and Walter Mytton Colvin all passed distinguished careers in India, and a fourth, Clement Sneyd, C.S.I., was secretary of the public works department of the India Office in London. The third son, Auckland Colvin (1838–1908), was lieutenant-governor of the North-West Provinces and Oudh, and also served in Egypt. He co-founded the Colvin Taluqdars' College in Lucknow; he also published a biography of his father in 1895.

== Further generations ==
Sir Elliot Graham Colvin's daughter Brenda Colvin (1897–1981) was an important landscape architect, author of standard works in the field, and a force behind its professionalisation.

One of Clement Sneyd's sons became Admiral Sir Ragnar Colvin, KBE, CB, and fathered John Horace Ragnar Colvin, the Cold War diplomat. Another son Sir C. Preston Colvin had much involvement in railway administration in Burma and India.

John Colvin's son was the Australian journalist Mark Colvin (1952–2017), who wrote of his own and his father's careers in his 2016 book Light and Shadow: Memoirs of a Spy's Son.

== See also ==
- Colvin (surname)
