= Rulers of India series =

Biographical book series

The Rulers of India was a biographical book series edited by William Wilson Hunter and published by Clarendon Press, Oxford. Hunter himself contributed the volumes on Dalhousie (1890) and Mayo (1891) to the series.

== Background ==
William Hunter retired from his long career as a member of the Indian Civil Service in March 1887 and settled in Oxford, England. On 13 March 1889 Philip Lyttelton Gell, then Secretary to the Delegates of the Clarendon Press, wrote to Hunter about

a project which has been for some time under the consideration of the Delegates, to publish a series giving the salient features of Indian History in the Biographies of successive Generals and Administrators.

Gell arranged the publication of the series by June 1889; with Hunter receiving £75 for each volume, and the author £25. Financial constraints forced the series to end at 28 volumes in spite of Hunter's disappointment about the same.

== Volumes ==
Volume	Year	Author	Title	References	External scan
1	-	Vincent Arthur Smith	Asoka	-	Wikisource transcription project
2	-	Stanley Lane-Poole	Babur	-	Wikisource transcription project
3	-	H. Morse Stephens	Albuquerque	-	Wikisource transcription project
4	-	George Bruce Malleson	Akbar		Wikisource transcription project
5	-	Stanley Lane-Poole	Aurangzeb	-	Wikisource transcription project
6	-	George Bruce Malleson	Joseph François Dupleix		Wikisource transcription project
7	-	George Bruce Malleson	Lord Clive		Wikisource transcription project
8	-	Lionel James Trotter	Warren Hastings		Wikisource transcription project
9	-	Henry George Keene	Madhava Rao Sindhia	-	Wikisource transcription project
10	-	Walter Scott Seton-Karr	The Marquis of Cornwallis	-	Wikisource transcription project
11	-	Lewin Bentham Bowring	Hyder Ali and Tipu Sultan	-	Wikisource transcription project
12	-	William Holden Hutton	The Marquess Wellesley		Wikisource transcription project
13	-	Major Ross of Bladensburg	The Marquess of Hastings	-	Wikisource transcription project
14	-	James Sutherland Cotton	Mountstuart Elphinstone		Wikisource transcription project
15	-	John Bradshaw	Sir Thomas Munro	-	Wikisource transcription project
16	-	Anne T. Ritchie and Richardson Evans	The Earl Amherst	-	Wikisource transcription project
17	-	Demetrius Charles Boulger	Lord William Bentinck	-	Wikisource transcription project
18	-	Lionel James Trotter	The Earl of Auckland	-	Wikisource transcription project
19	-	Charles Stewart Hardinge	Sir Henry Hardinge	-	Wikisource transcription project
20	-	Lepel Griffin	Ranjit Singh	-	Wikisource transcription project
21	-	William Wilson Hunter	The Marquess of Dalhousie		Wikisource transcription project
22	-	Richard Temple	James Thomason	-	Wikisource transcription project
23	-	Auckland Colvin	John Russell Colvin		Wikisource transcription project
24	-	James John McLeod Innes	Sir Henry Lawrence	-	Wikisource transcription project
25	-	Owen Tudor Burne	Clyde and Strathnairn		Wikisource transcription project
26	-	Henry Stewart Cunningham	The Earl Canning	-	Wikisource transcription project
27	-	Charles Umpherston Aitchison	Lord Lawrence	-	Wikisource transcription project
28	-	William Wilson Hunter	The Earl of Mayo		Wikisource transcription project

== Bibliography ==
- Chatterjee, Rimi B. (2004). ""Every Line for India" : The Oxford University Press and the Rise and Fall of the Rulers of India Series". In Chakravorty, Swapan; Gupta, Abhijit (eds.). Print Areas: Book History in India. Orient Blackswan. pp. 65–102. ISBN 978-81-7824-082-4.
- Encyclopaedia of Indian Rulers. Cosmo Publications. 2001.
