= Abernethy House =

House in Hampstead, London

Coordinates: 51°33′26″N 0°10′50″W

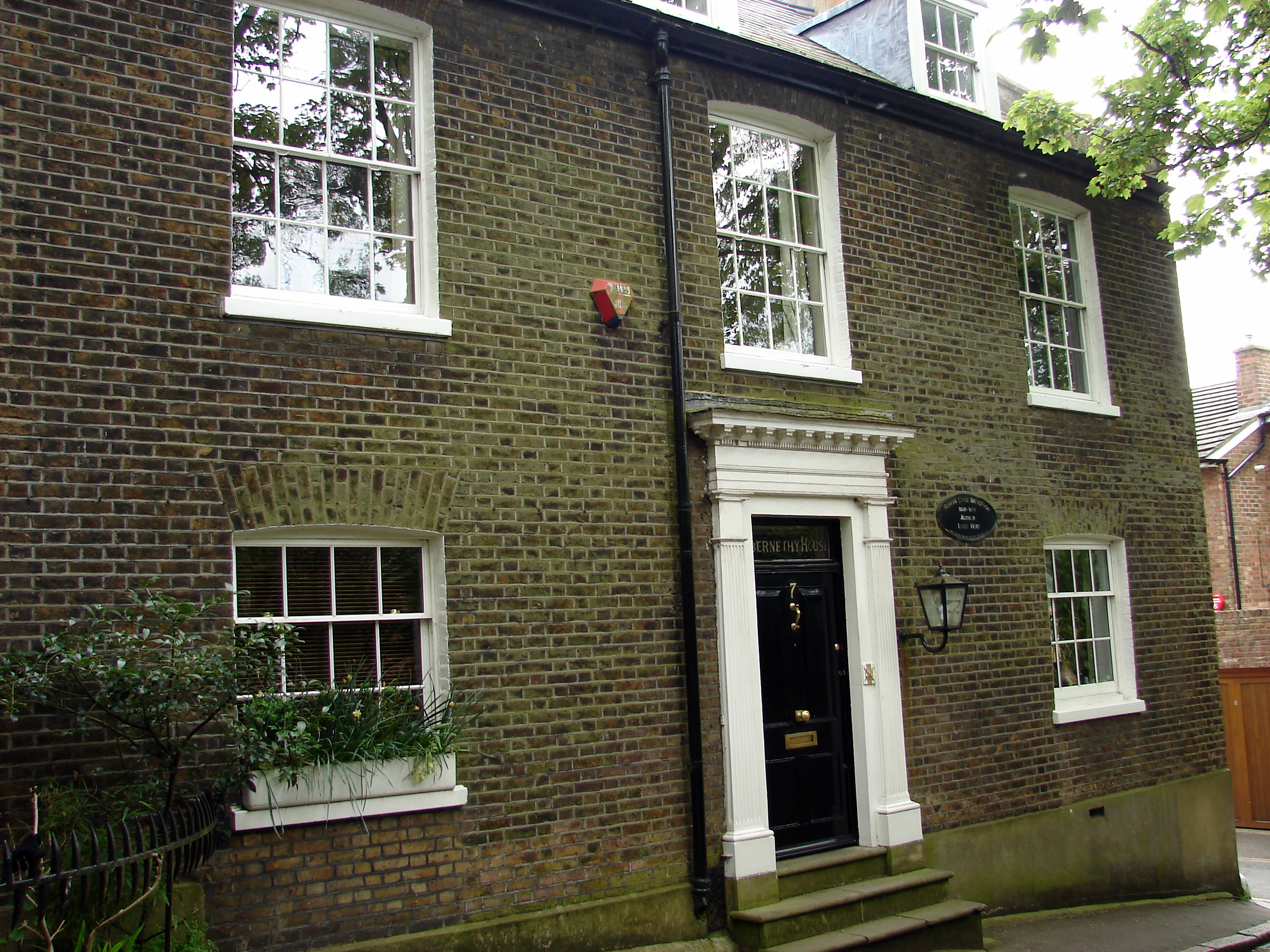
Abernethy House in May 2010

Abernethy House at 7 Mount Vernon is a house in Hampstead in the London Borough of Camden. It has been listed Grade II on the National Heritage List for England (NHLE) since May 1974. It was originally built as a girls school around 1819. It is a 2-storey house with attics with a double front with 3 windows. A wooden door case surrounds the central entrance.

The house was a lodging house by the 1870s. In 1873 the writer Robert Louis Stevenson stayed here for the first time. it was whilst staying at the house that Stevenson wrote that "Hampstead is the most delightful place for air and scenery near London". Stevenson also stayed here with Sidney Colvin.

A plaque erected by the commemorates Stevenston's stay at the house.
