= 1872 Birthday Honours =

Appointments by Queen Victoria to various orders and honours

The 1872 Birthday Honours were appointments by Queen Victoria to various orders and honours to reward and highlight good works by citizens of the British Empire. The appointments were made to celebrate the official birthday of the Queen, and were published in The London Gazette on 31 May 1872 and 4 June 1872.

The recipients of honours are displayed here as they were styled before their new honour, and arranged by honour, with classes (Knight, Knight Grand Cross, etc.) and then divisions (Military, Civil, etc.) as appropriate.

== United Kingdom and British Empire ==
=== The Most Exalted Order of the Star of India ===
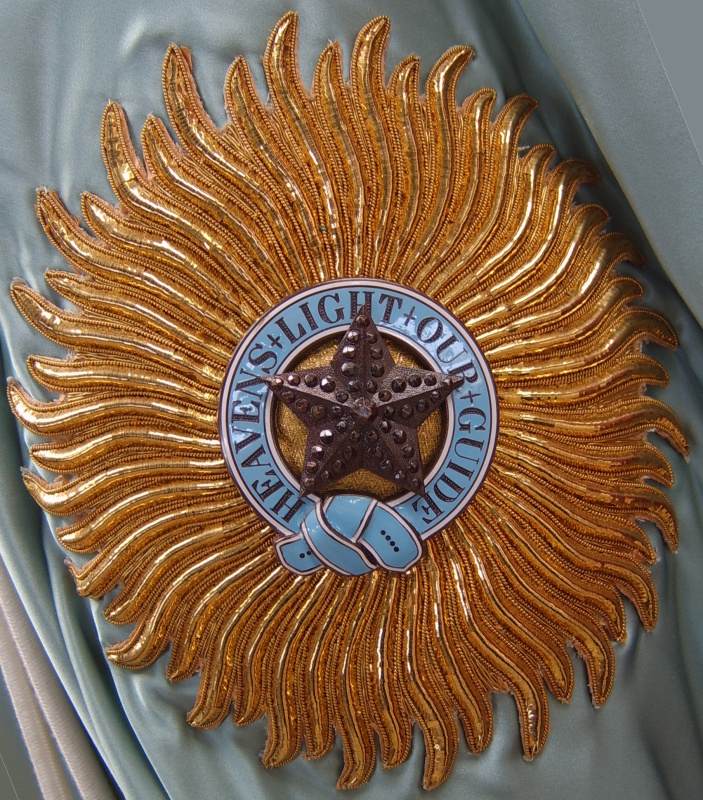
Star of a Knight Grand Commander of the Most Exalted Order of the Star of India

==== Knight Grand Commander (GCSI) ====
- Her Highness the Nawab Shah Jehan, Begum of Bhopal

==== Knight Commander (KCSI) ====
- John Strachey, Bengal Civil Service, Member of the Council of the Governor-General of India
- John Cracroft Wilson CB Bengal Civi Service (Retired), late Civil and Sessions Judge at Moradabad, and Special Commissioner for the Trial of Rebels and Mutineers in 1857–58

==== Companion (CSI) ====
- Major Owen Tudor Burne, 20th Regiment of Foot, Private Secretary to the late Viceroy and Governor-General of India
- Lieutenant-Colonel George Bruce Malleson, Bengal Staff Corps, Guardian to His Highness the Maharajah of Mysore
- Mahomed Hyat Khan, Assistant Commissioner Punjab
- Lieutenant-Colonel Alfred Thomas Etheridge, Bombay Staff Corps, late Inam Commissioner, Southern Mabratta Country

=== The Most Distinguished Order of Saint Michael and Saint George ===
==== Companion of the Order of St Michael and St George (CMG) ====
- John Pope Hennessy, late Governor and Commander-in-Chief of the Island of Labuan and its Dependencies, and now administering the Government of Her Majesty's West Africa Settlements,
- Herbert Taylor Ussher, Administrator of the Government of Her Majesty's Settlement on the Gold Coast in Western Africa
