= Herbert Taylor Ussher =

British colonial administrator

Herbert Taylor John Ussher CMG (22 April 1836 – 2 December 1880) was a British colonial administrator who became Governor of the Gold Coast (now Ghana). In private life he was a keen ornithologist.

He was the son of Thomas Neville Ussher, Consul General of Haiti (and grandson of Rear-Admiral Sir Thomas Ussher), and his wife Eliza Fawcett. On joining the colonial service he sailed for West Africa in 1864 to become the Private Secretary of the Governor of Lagos. Ussher was subsequently made Collector of Customs in 1866 and then Administrator of the Cape Coast from 1867 to 1872. He was invested a Companion of the Order of St Michael and St George (CMG) in the 1872 Birthday Honours.

He was then appointed Governor of Tobago for 1872–1875 and Governor of Labuan (islands off the coast of Borneo) before returning to be Governor of the Gold Coast from June 1879 until his death in December 1880.

He died in Christiansborg Castle in Accra and was buried in the London Market Cemetery in James Town, Accra. He had married Julie Sarah Hicks née Bond in 1854 and had a daughter, Constance.

Ussher Fort, previously known as Fort Crèvecoeur, was renamed in his honour when the British gained possession of it in 1868.

== Ornithology ==
Ussher was a keen ornithologist and compiled a list of the birds of Ghana that was published in 1874: "Notes on the ornithology of the Gold Coast". While posted to Ghana and to Labuan he collected bird specimens which he shipped back to the ornithologist Richard Bowdler Sharpe in London. Some of these species were new to science and have been named after him:

- Mottled spinetail (Telacanthura ussheri)
- Rufous fishing owl (Scotopelia ussheri)
- Black-crowned pitta (Erythropitta ussheri)
- Ussher's flycatcher (Artomyias ussheri)

Some birds are now considered to be subspecies:

- Lesser honeyguide (Indicator minor ussheri)
- Brown-crowned tchagra (Tchagra australis ussheri)
- Tit hylia (Pholidornis rushiae ussheri)

In a collaboration with Sharpe, Ussher formally described two species of bird that are native to Africa: Shelley's eagle-owl (Ketupa shelleyi) and the red-fronted antpecker (Parmoptila rubrifrons).

Government offices
Preceded by Sanford Freeling	Governor of the Gold Coast; 1879–1880	Succeeded by Sir Samuel Rowe
Preceded by Sir Henry Ernest Gascoyne Bulwer	Governor of Labuan; 1875–1879	Succeeded by Sir Charles Lees
Preceded by Cornelius Hendricksen Kortright	Lieutenant Governor of Tobago; 1872–1875	Succeeded by Robert William Harley
