= Red Pamphlet =

The Mutiny of the Bengal Army: An Historical Narrative
- Author: George Bruce Malleson
- Language: English
- Publication date: 1857

The Mutiny of the Bengal Army: An Historical Narrative, popularly known as the Red Pamphlet, is an 1857 booklet authored by British officer and historian George Bruce Malleson. The publication gives a critique of James Broun-Ramsay, 1st Marquess of Dalhousie and Charles Canning, 1st Earl Canning. Malleson argued that some of Dalhousie's policies undermined traditional Indian rulers, disregarded local customs, and fostered widespread public distrust, ultimately serving as a trigger for the Indian Rebellion of 1857. Due to its inflammatory critique of British colonial administration during an active conflict, the pamphlet was promptly suppressed and confiscated by British authorities upon release. Disagreeing with Malleson, former member of the Bengal Civil Service, Charles Allen, wrote A few words anent the 'red' pamphlet, which became known as the Yellow Pamphlet.
