= Elliott Colvin (died 1883) =

Elliott Graham Colvin
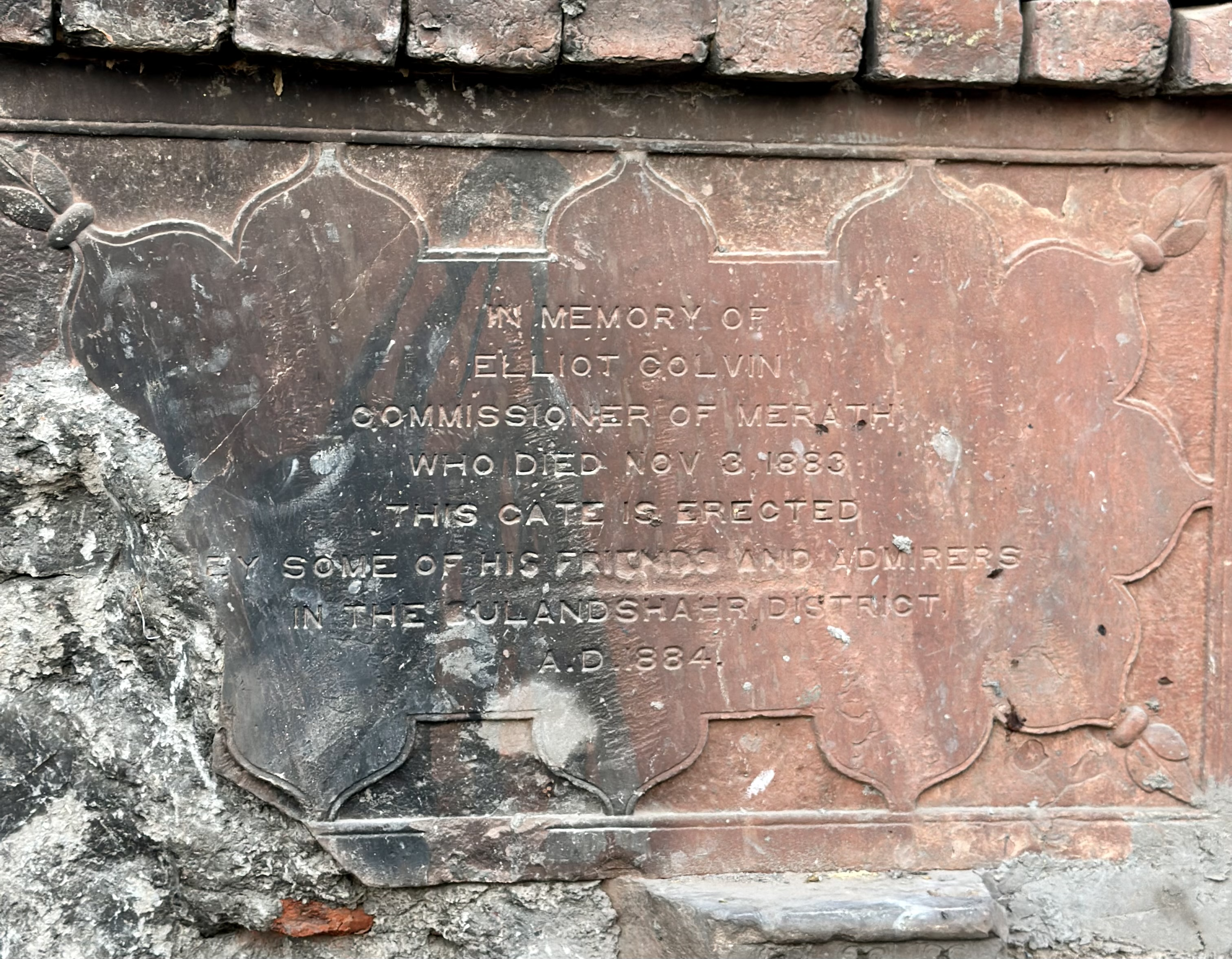
- Colvin Gate memorial, Bulandshahr

Personal details
- Born: 1836 Calcutta, British India
- Died: 3 November 1883 (aged 46–47) Sahanpur, Uttar Pradesh, India

Elliott Graham Colvin (1836–1883) was a British Indian Civil Service (ICS) Officer. He served in Mathura and Meerut during the Indian Rebellion of 1857 and later became Meerut's Commissioner. After his death, a gate was erected in his memory in Bulandshahr on the instructions of Frederic Growse.

== Early life and family ==
Elliott Colvin was born in 1836 in Calcutta, now Kolkata, to John Russell Colvin. (Note: Of the same name was Sir Elliot Graham Colvin, born in 1861 and died in 1940.) His siblings included Auckland Colvin and Walter Colvin. In 1850 he became a naval cadet. He was educated at Eton and from 1853 to 1855 was at Haileybury.

On 18 September 1862 in Nainital, he married Edith, the eldest daughter of Peter Cunningham. (Note: She later moved back to England and died there in 1914.) The Times of India later noted that "he was peculiarly happy in his married life". He learnt French, German and Russian, and was familiar with several Northern Indian dialects.

== Career ==
Colvin returned to India on 6 November 1855. In November 1856 he was attached to the North-West Provinces where he was posted assistant in the Agra division and then assistant magistrate and collector to Agra. In May 1857, at the onset of the Indian Rebellion of 1857, he was transferred to Mathura. He fought at Hathras, Aligarh and the surrounding areas. He also became well known at Budaun. He spent a few months at Meerut before being appointed as superintendent of the Terai District towards Rohilkhand. Between 1857 and 1878, he also held various posts at Meerat, Bareilly, Moradabad, Benares.

In 1880 Colvin held posts in Muzaffarnagar and Benares. Later, he became settlement officer, collector and commissioner back at Meerut. There, he led the search for European graves and commissioned maintenance of the burial sites.

== Death and legacy ==
At the age of 47, Colvin's health began to deteriorate. He died of "inflammation of the lungs" on 3 November 1883 at Sahanpur, and his body was taken to Meerut. He was buried at Meerut cemetery. At Meerut, he was succeeded by Mr. Quinton, a member of the Viceregal Council.

Following his death, a gate in his memory was constructed at a cost of 4,000 rupees at the east wall of Moti Bagh in Bulandshahr, Uttar Pradesh, at the instruction of Frederic Growse. Growse wrote in his 1884 book Bulandshahr; or, Sketches of an Indian district; social, historical and architectural that Colvin's "sudden untimely death, on the 3rd November 1883, was deeply felt by all classes of the community". An illustration of the gate was planned for inclusion in the second part of Growse's Indian Architecture of To-day as Exemplified in New Buildings in the Bulandshahr District.

=== Colvin gate ===
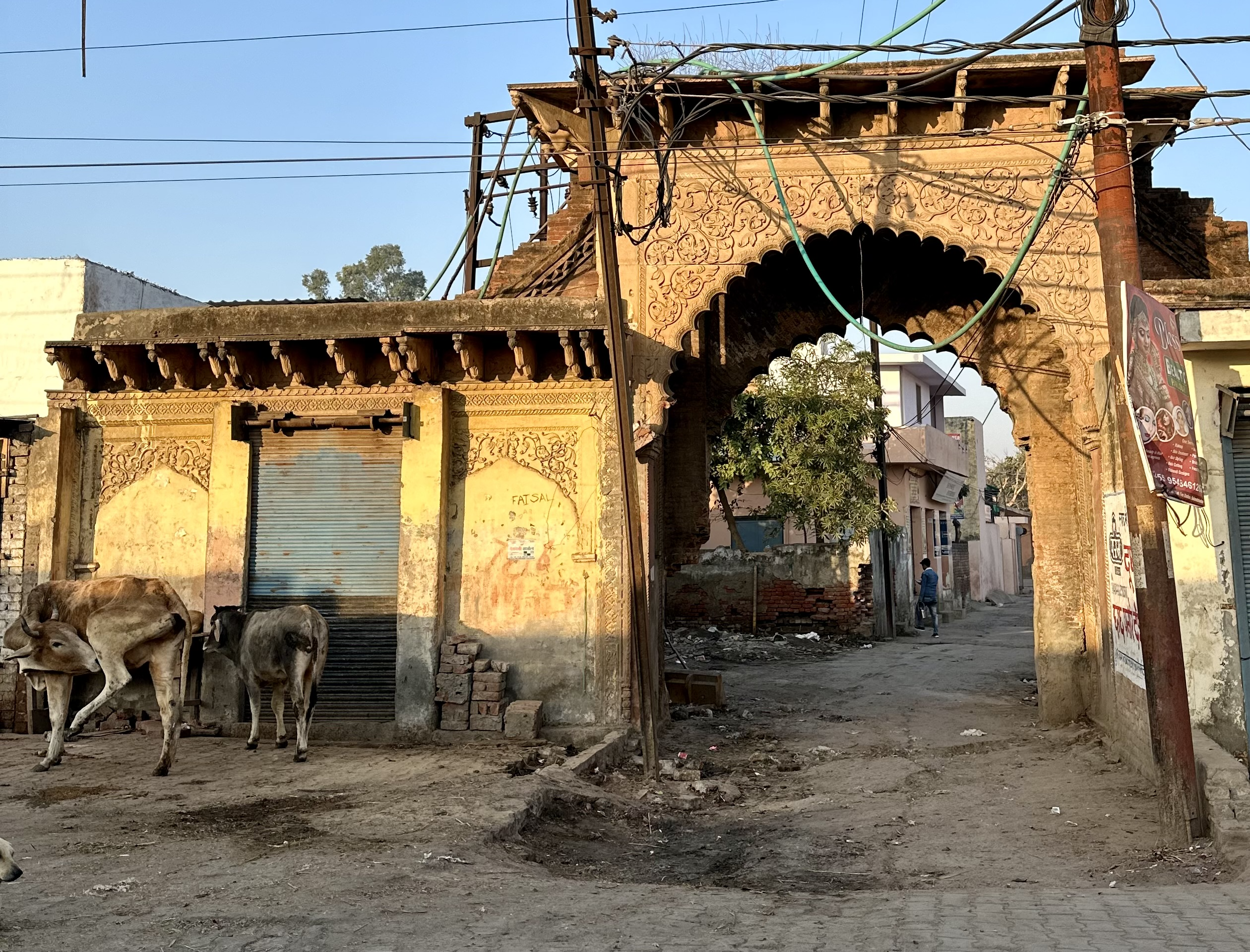
Facing market

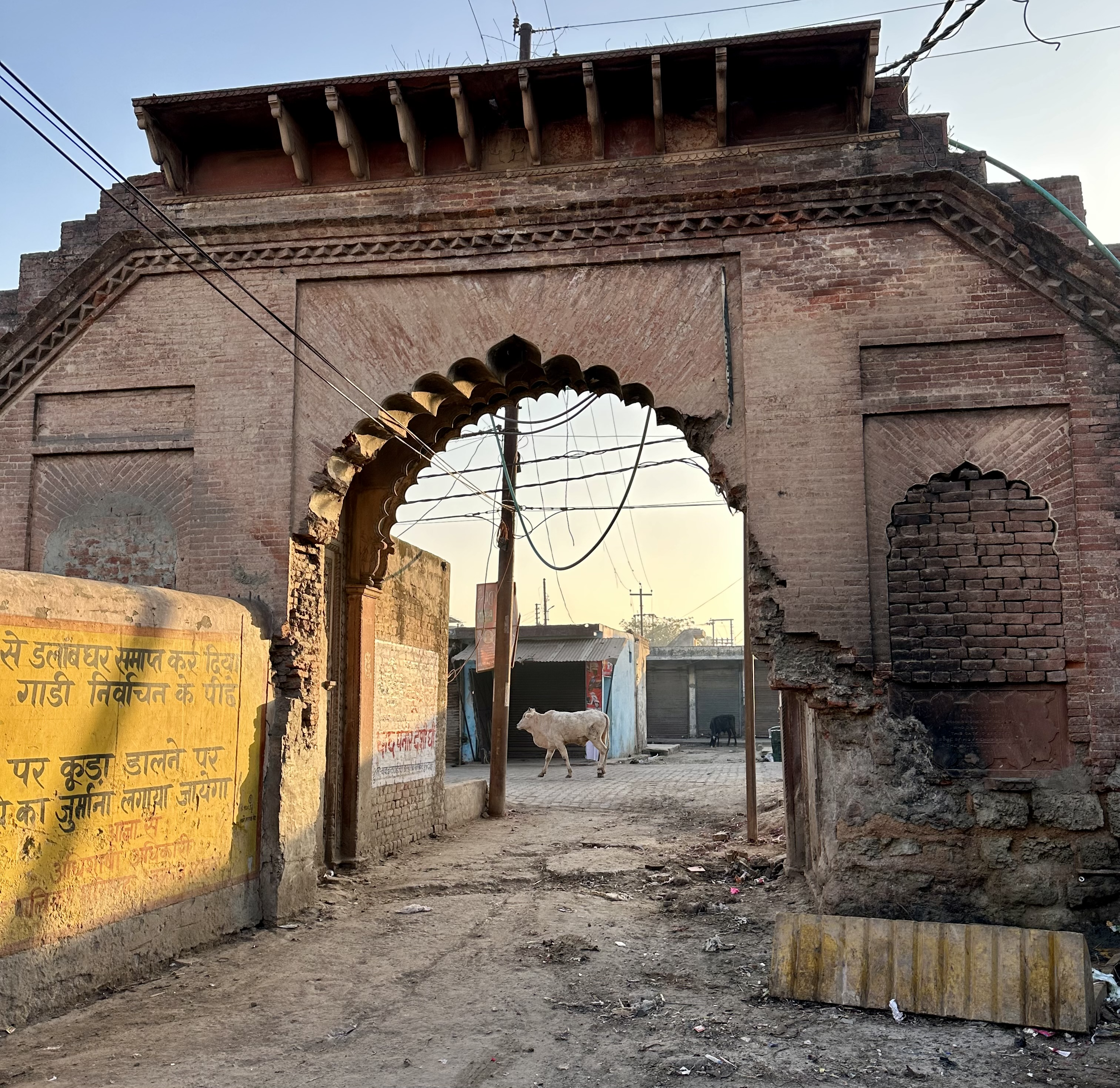
Facing Moti Bagh

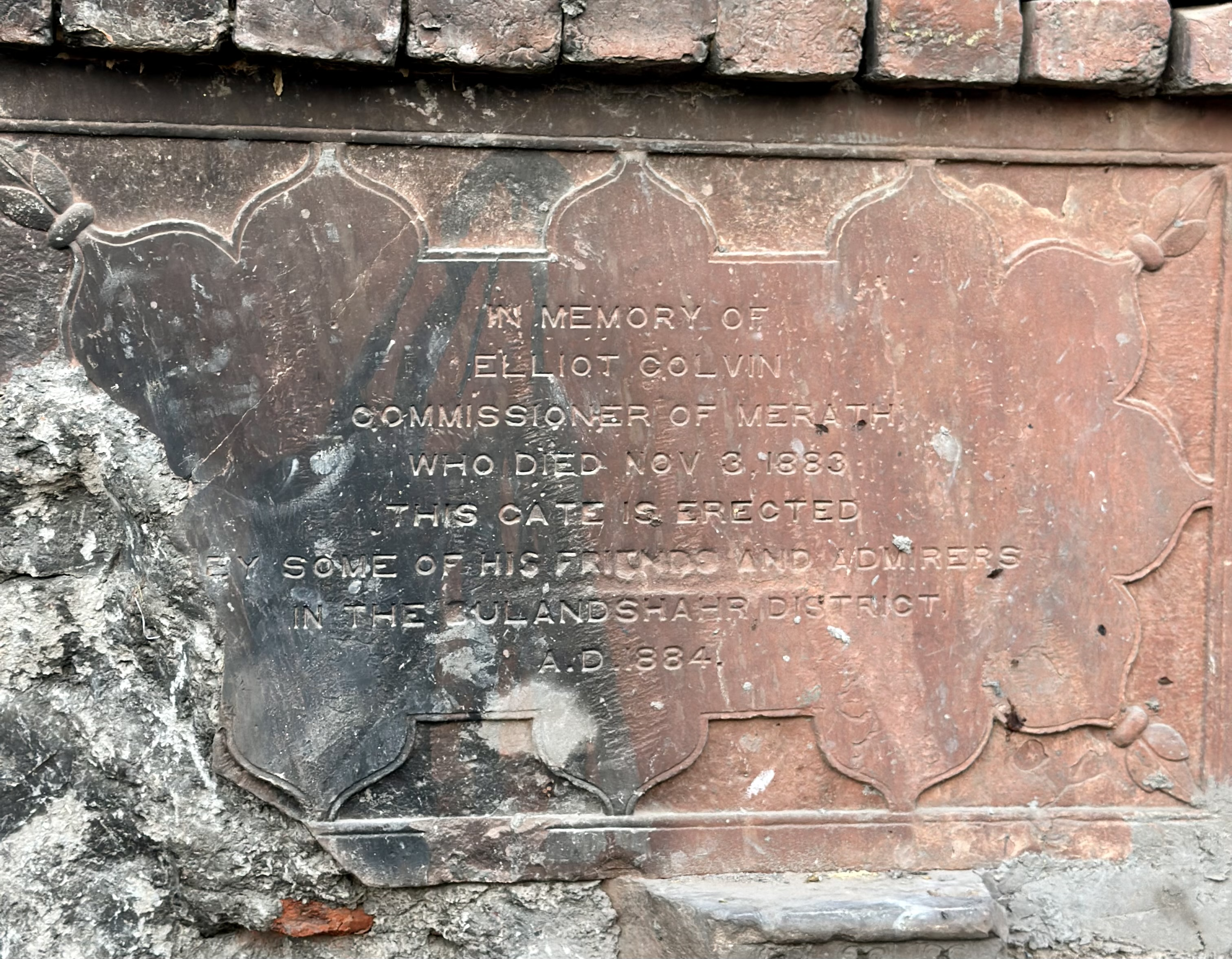
Memorial plaque facing Moti Bagh

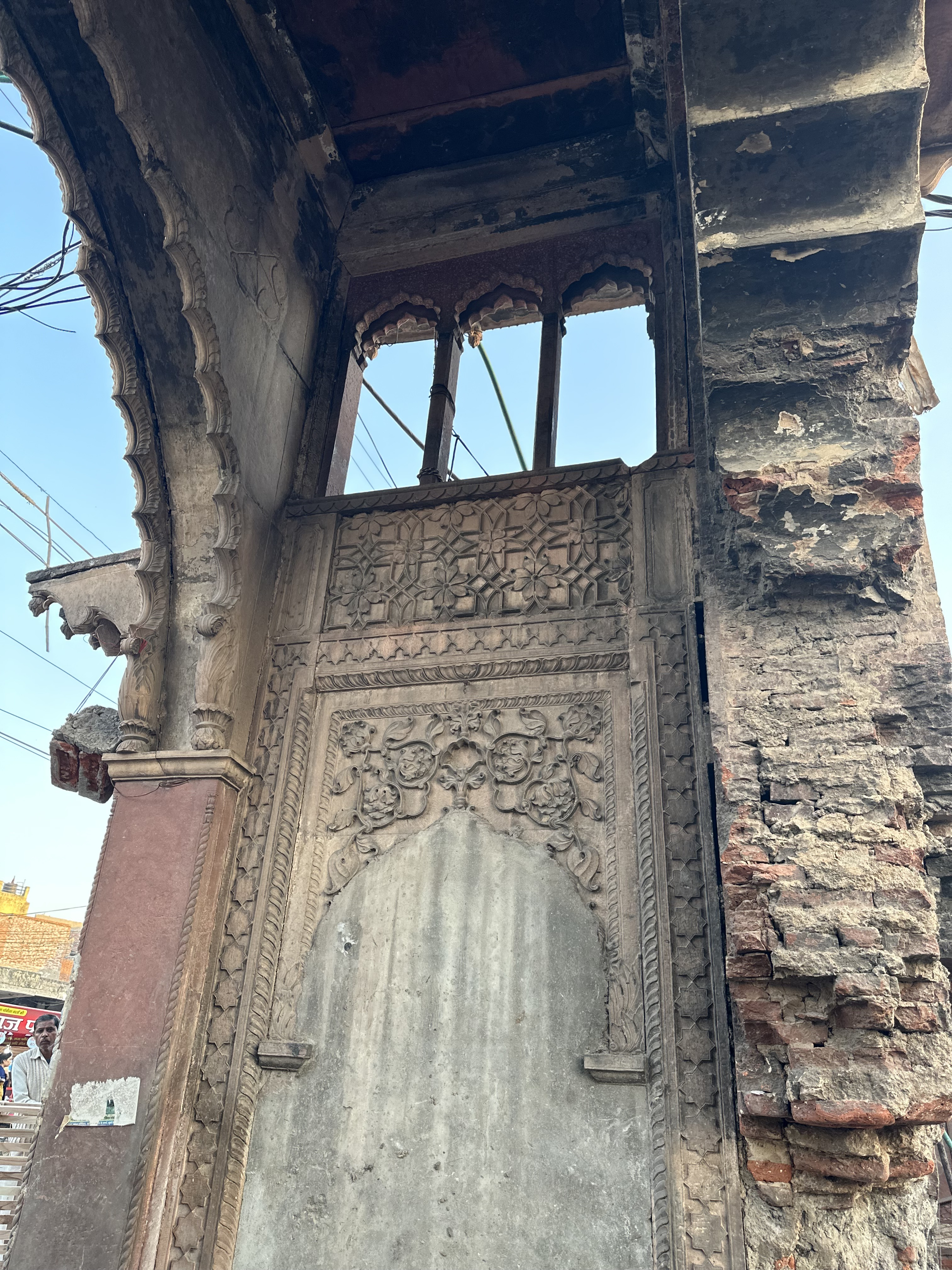
Inside arch
