= H. Morse Stephens =

Anglo-American historian and professor of history

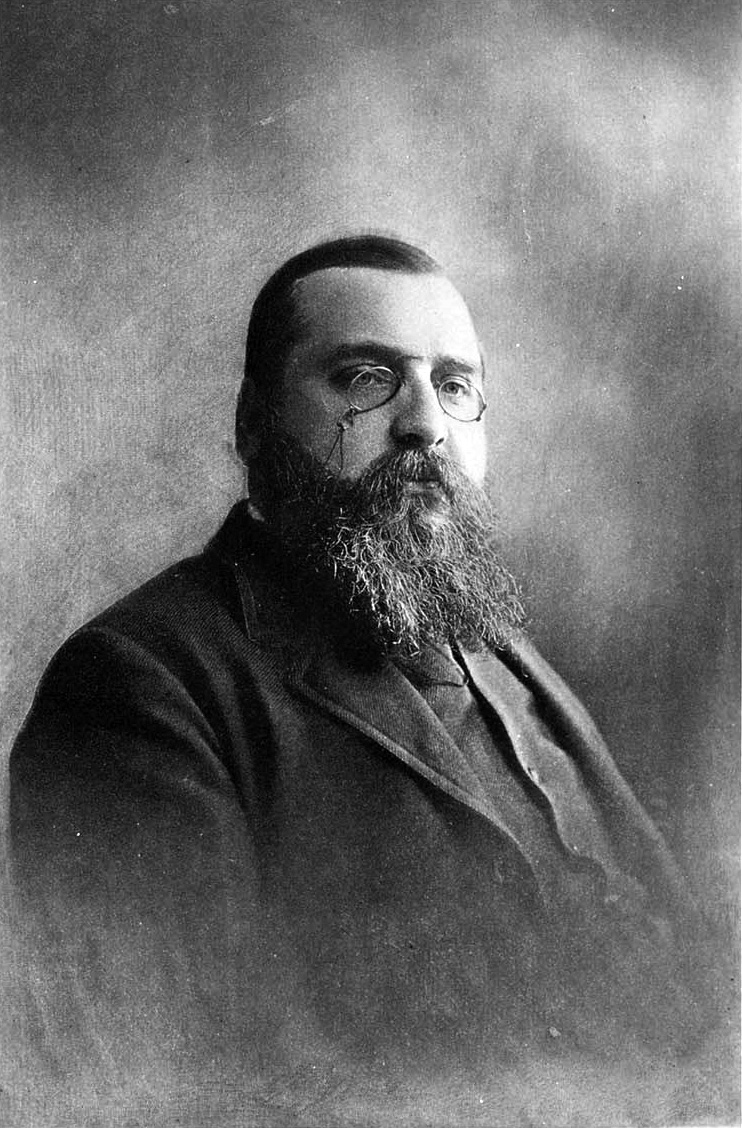
H. Morse Stephens, circa 1902

Henry Morse Stephens (October 3, 1857 – April 16, 1919) was an American historian and professor of history at the University of California, Berkeley who helped to purchase the Bancroft Library, and who worked to build archives of California history, the 1906 San Francisco earthquake, and World War I.

== Early life ==
Henry Morse Stephens was born on October 3, 1857, in Edinburgh, Scotland. He was educated at Haileybury College, and attended Balliol College, Oxford University, where he was granted a B.A. in 1880 and an M.A. in 1892. He was a staff lecturer on the Oxford University Extension System from 1892 to 1894, and lecturer on Indian history at Cambridge, writing also for The Academy, The Daily Chronicle, The Speaker, and 'acting as London correspondent for The Statesman and the Calcutta Friend of India.'

== Career ==
Stephens immigrated to the United States in 1894 and took the position of Professor at Cornell University in the Department of History, where he taught European History. At Cornell, Stephens took a particular interest in advising undergraduates, starting two traditions which endured at Cornell for the next two decades: Thursday nights for upper classmen, and career conferences and advice to seniors as to their future professional careers. He was also an avid fundraiser for Cornell's athletic teams. He was elected to the American Philosophical Society in 1897 and the American Academy of Arts and Sciences in 1900.

In 1902, Stephens went to the University of California as professor of history and director of University Extension, a position he held from 1902 to 1909. He served as Dean of the University of California College of Arts and Sciences from the fall of 1918 until his death. During his time at Berkeley, he worked to build the Bancroft Library's collection of historical materials, with special success in the area of Spanish and Mexican History, now known as the Bolton Collection.

Stephens was involved with the Bohemian Club and wrote the script for St. Patrick at Tara, the main Grove Play performed in 1909 at the Bohemian Grove. The play depicted Saint Patrick and his interaction with druids, chieftains and kings of Ireland.

Stephens was an active member of the American Historical Association serving as its President in 1915. His most notable contribution in the AHA, however, was as a member of the Committee of Seven, which in 1899 produced the report The Study of History in Schools for the AHA, and which influenced the teaching of history in American schools for the next 40 years.

Stephens Hall on the U.C. Berkeley campus is named for him, as was the Lodge of Free and Accepted Masons, chartered by the Grand Lodge of F. & A. Masons of California and Hawaii: Henry Morse Stephens #541, for which membership was open only to UC administrators, alumni, faculty and students. The lodge merged with other Berkeley Lodges and is now part of Bay Cities Lodge #337, now in Richmond.

== History of the San Francisco earthquake, World War I archives ==
After the 1906 San Francisco earthquake, at the suggestion University of California President Benjamin Ide Wheeler, Morse joined the Committee of 50, and in consultation with Governor Pardee, moved to the Earthquake History and Statistics Committee. As a member of this committee, he worked until his death to gather as many accounts and as much historical material as he could that was related to the earthquake. Morse collected over 800 individual accounts of the earthquake and fire as well as numerous newspaper articles, photographs, and other archival material. Unfortunately, after his death, the archive was never incorporated into the Bancroft library collection, as he had intended, and was lost in the 1920s, perhaps in a 1923 Berkeley fire.

When World War I broke out, Stephens began actively soliciting materials from around the world to document and formed a "Great War History Committee", work that was cut short by his death on April 16, 1919.

== Bibliography ==
- A history of the French revolution, by H. Morse Stephens, In three volumes. Vol. I–II. New York, C. Scribner's sons, 1886–91.
- The principal speeches of the statesmen and orators of the French revolution, 1789–1795; ed. with introductions, notes, and indices, by H. Morse Stephens. 2 vols. Oxford, Clarendon Press, 1892.
- Stephens, H. Morse. "The Story of the Nations: Portugal". Project Gutenberg (digitized in 2014, updated 2024 ed.).
- Henry Morse Stephens. Albuquerque, Rulers of India series. Clarendon Press at Project Gutenberg
- Revolutionary Europe, 1789–1815, By H. Morse Stephens. London: Rivingtons, 1900, fifth edition
- Sir Robert Peel, a memorial biography
- Stephens, Henry Morse; Wallace Arthur Sabin, Charles Caldwell Dobie, Bohemian Club. St. Patrick at Tara, 1909 Grove play
