= Liaqat Hayat Khan =

Indian official (1887–1948)

Liaqat Hyat (Hayat) Khan KCSI OBE
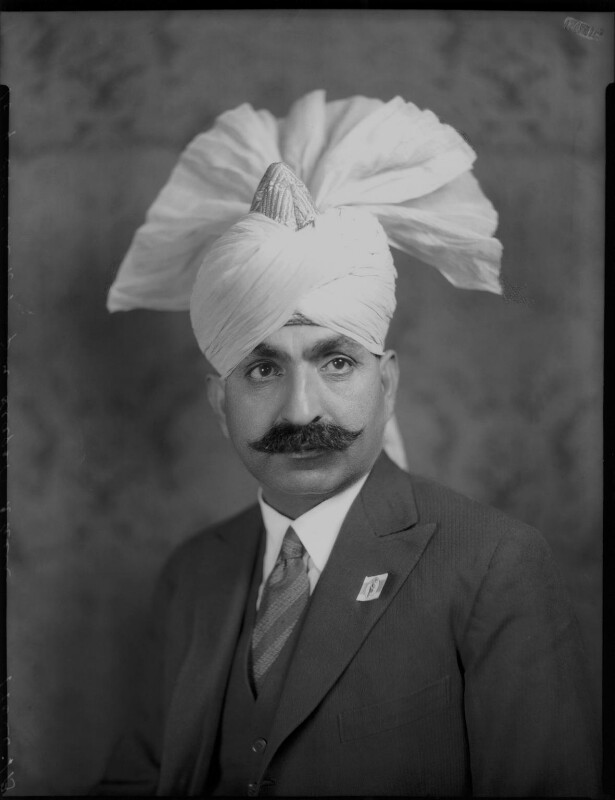
- Portrait by Bassano Ltd, 1935
- Born: 1887; Wah, Punjab, British Raj
- Died: 1948 (aged 60–61)
- Father: Muhammad Hayat Khan
- Relatives: Sikandar Hayat Khan (brother); Shaukat Hayat Khan (nephew); Sadiq Hussain Qureshi (grandson)[Shakir Ullah Durrani]] (son in law); Tehmina Durrani (grand daughter); Ashiq Hussain Qureshi (grandson); Rohail Hayat (great grandson)

Khan Bahadur Nawab Sir Liaqat Hyat (Hayat) Khan KCIE OBE (also sometimes 'Liaquat Hayat Khan'), (1887 – 1948) was an Indian official who served for most of his career as a minister and later Prime Minister of Patiala State, in British India. After the partition of 1947, he became the ambassador of Pakistan to France until 1948.

== Early life ==
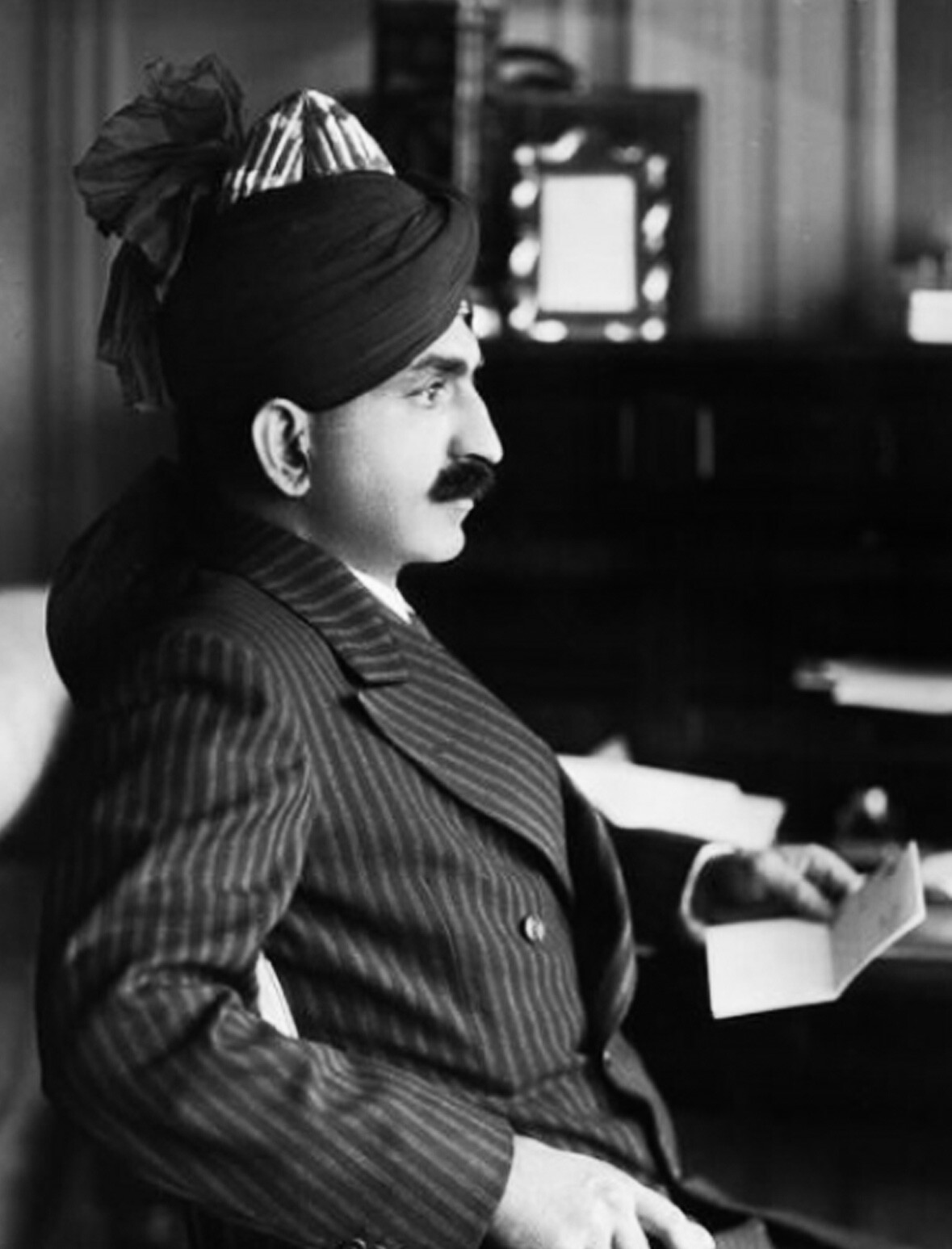
Sir Liaqat Hayat Khan as PM Patiala 1933

Sir Liaqat was the son of Nawab Muhammad Hyat Khan, CSI, Khattar, of Wah (now in Pakistan Punjab), and the elder brother of Sir Sikander Hyat Khan. His grandson, Nawab Sadiq Hussain Qureshi served as both Governor and Chief Minister of Punjab during the regime of Bhutto. He was educated in Col. Brown Cambridge School, Dehra Dun.

After his early education at Col Brown Cambridge School and Aligarh Muslim University, Sir Liaqat Hayat found employment as a junior police officer in the Patiala princely state, and in due course, rose to be head of the police in this territory. His son-in-law Shakir Ullah Durrani was the Governor of the State Bank of Pakistan, while his granddaughter Tehmina Durrani is an author. One of his son in law was Nawab Haibat Khan of Tank.

Sir Liaqat Hyat was employed as a police officer in the Imperial Police. His excellent performance was noticed by Maharaja Bhupinder Singh of Patiala at the Imperial Durbar in 1911 at Delhi. His Highness Patiala invited him to take charge as the Home Minister of the State. In due course, he was appointed Prime Minister of the state. His prowess and deft handling of the socio-political and financial affairs of Patiala were highly appreciated by His Highness.

He was knighted by the Imperial government and Maharaja Patiala nominated him as a delegate to represent the Chamber of Princes on behalf of the Patiala State at the Round Table Conferences in London, [England]. Subsequent to his retirement from Patiala in 1938, he was appointed as the Political Advisor to the State of Bhopal. He later opted for Pakistan in 1947 and was also designated as Ambassador to France by the Government of Pakistan. Before he could assume office, he died at Murree. He died in 1948.

== Career ==
He began his career as Deputy Superintendent of Police, Punjab in 1909. In 1919, he became Superintendent in charge of a district. In 1923, his services were lent by Patiala as Home Secretary where he later became Home Minister. He later became Prime Minister of Patiala from 1930 to 1940. He represented Patiala at the Round Table Conferences in 1931 and 1932. He represented Patiala at Joint Committee on Indian Constitutional Reform in 1933. His administrative skills were widely hailed and appreciated, so much so that rival princely states would scheme and plan to get him to jump ship but he would remain loyal to Maharaja Bhupinder Singh till he lived, and retired soon after his demise. He served Patiala’s people with utmost honesty and fairness, without any biases on religious or cast grounds. For more on his achievements during his stint as Prime Minister Patiala, please refer to the book written by ex Indian foreign minister, Natwar Singh, The Magnificent Maharaja... https://rupapublications.co.in/books/the-magnificent-maharaja/

He served as political advisor to Nawab of Bhopal from 1943 to 1945.

== Family ==
The famous Pakistani musician Rohail Hayat is a great-grandson of Sir Liaqat .

== See also ==
- Nawab Muhammad Hayat Khan
