= Muhammad Hayat Khan =

Punjabi politician and author (1833–1901)

Muhammad Hayat Khan Khattar CSI
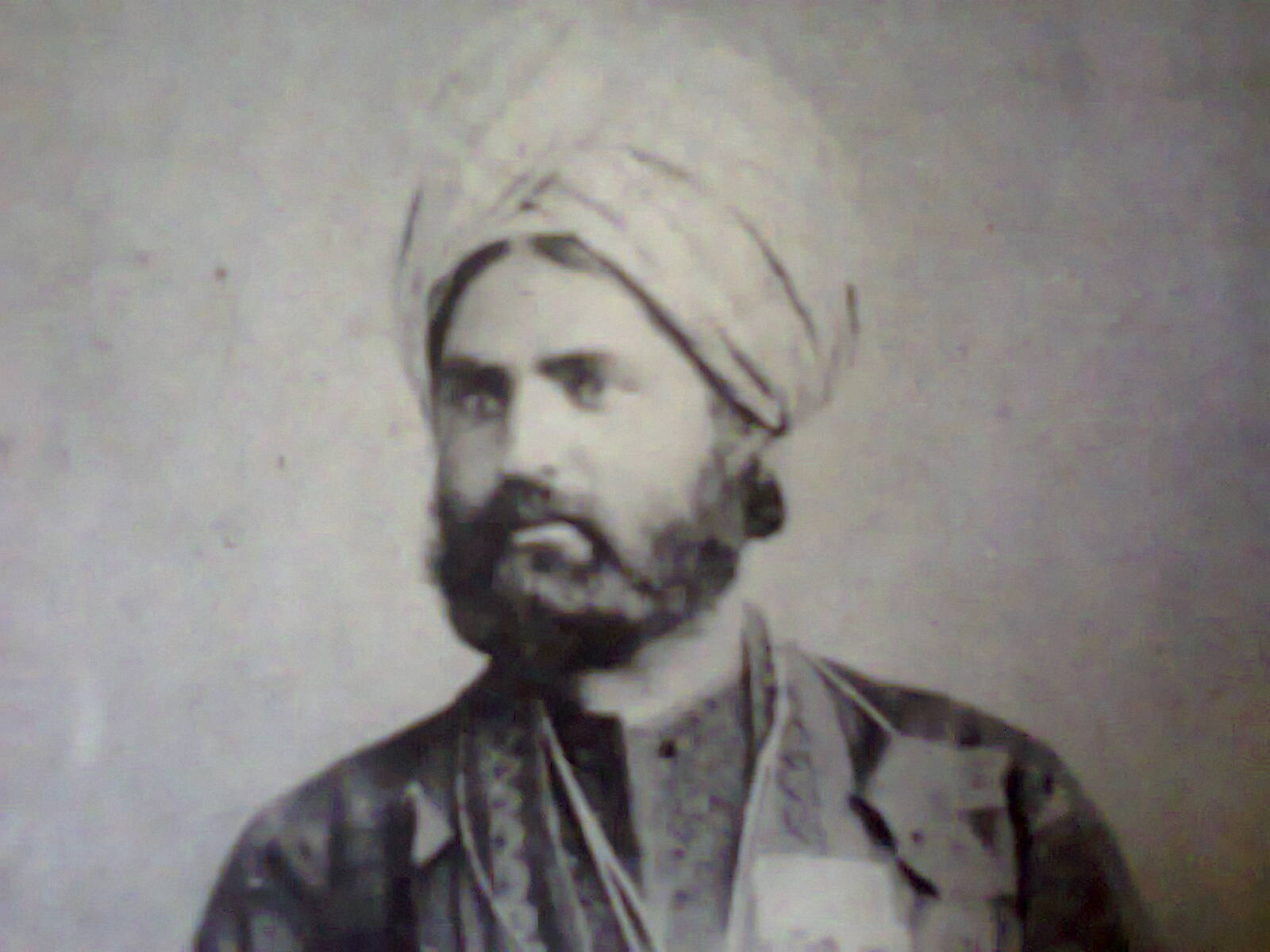
- Nawab Muhammad Hayat Khan, circa 1860s

Personal details
- Born: 1833 Wah, Sikh Empire
- Died: 1901 (aged 67–68) Wah, Punjab Province, British Raj
- Spouse: Zainab Khatun
- Children: Sikandar Hayat Khan; Liaqat Hayat Khan; Barkat Hyat Khan

Nawab Muhammad Hayat Khan Khattar CSI (c. 1833–1901) was a Punjabi Muslim landlord, politician and author in British India. He rose to considerable distinction in the British Indian government.

== Early life ==
Muhammad Hayat Khan was born to Sardar Karam Khan, a Khattar chieftain, in the village of Wah, Punjab in the Sikh Empire.

At the end of the First Anglo-Sikh War, his father Karam Khan cultivated a favourable relationship with officers of the British East India Company appointed to administer the Punjab Province under Sir Henry Lawrence.

In June–July 1848, he accompanied British officer John Nicholson to the Margalla pass in a mission to capture a strategic tower near Taxila following an uprising of Sikh soldiers. (Note: In fact as part of the commencement of the Second Anglo-Sikh War) During the course of the battle, he gained recognition for daringly rescuing Nicholson when he became trapped in a hazardous situation. Thereafter, Nicholson and Karam Khan became close friends.

In late 1848, Karam Khan was killed whilst asleep, by his half-brother Fatteh Khan. His wife and children fled their ancestral village and sought refuge in the nearby Hazara region where they met James Abbott, the then Deputy Commissioner of Hazara. Abbott in turn sent them to Nicholson, who restored the family their estate and secured the education of the orphaned children.

== Career ==
After attaining some basic education, especially a fluency in the Persian language, young Muhammad Hayat was appointed by Nicholson as his orderly and Persian interpreter, since he felt a responsibility towards the son of his late friend. Thereafter, Hayat Khan served as a close companion and aide to Nicholson throughout his campaigns and expeditions in Punjab (Note: Including the Second Anglo-Sikh War) and the 'Punjab Frontier' (areas that would later become part of the North West Frontier Province) until his death in Delhi, during the Indian War of Independence (or Indian Mutiny) in September 1857.

In 1857, after Nicholson was mortally wounded in the assault on the Kashmir Gate, Delhi, Hayat Khan tended to him though his last 8–9 days of life. According to tradition, Nicholson on his death-bed recommended the young man's services to Sir John Lawrence, then Chief Commissioner of the Punjab, asking him to reward and assist him in his future career. This proved to be the beginning of Khan's distinguished career spread out over many decades.

Soon after the rebellion was suppressed, he was appointed a Thanedar (police officer) at Talagang in Punjab, and was later transferred to the civil side of administration, as a Tehsildar (junior revenue officer). In 1862, he was promoted as Extra Assistant Commissioner and sent to Bannu, serving in that station and nearby Kohat under Sir Louis Cavagnari, then Assistant Commissioner. In 1864, he was sent on a mission to Afghanistan and in that same year, wrote his famous Hyat-i-Afghani in Urdu and also translated it into Persian, which was published in 1864 (later translated into English by H. Priestley, ICS, and published as 'Afghanistan and its Inhabitants' in 1875): probably still one of the best works on the subject.

In 1872, Khan was promoted an Assistant Commissioner and due to his sterling work, given the award of the Companion of the Order of the Star of India (CSI) on 31 May in the Birthday Honours; and later, appointed Assistant Political Agent in the Kurram tribal agency. During the Second Anglo-Afghan War, when General Sir Frederick Roberts (later Field Marshal, Lord Roberts of Kandahar) was sent in command of the Kurram Valley Field Force, Khan was made one of his main native aides.

After the conclusion of the war, Khan returned to civil administrative service in the Punjab, and in due course was moved to the judicial service. Between 1880 and 1888, he remained District and Sessions Judge in various places. In 1888–89, he became a member of the Punjab Board of Revenue and remained in this position for quite some time, finally being chosen to represent the Muslim zamindars (landowners) as a member of the Punjab Legislative Council in 1897.

In 1899, he was granted the personal title of Nawab in recognition of his long and particularly distinguished services and, in the words of an Englishman, '...a previously well-established Wah family [now] achieved new heights in the annals of British India'.

Nawab Muhammad Hayat Khan died in his ancestral village, Wah, in 1901.

== Contributions to Muslim education ==
Muhammad Hayat Khan was a very close friend and confidant of the senior Muslim thinker, scholar, writer and educational reformer Sir Syed Ahmad Khan, and remained very active under his guidance in the establishment of the Muhammadan Anglo-Oriental College at Aligarh (later Aligarh Muslim University). He presided over the 1888, 1889 and 1890 annual sessions of the 'Muhammadan Educational Conference' initiated by Sir Syed. He also played an active role in promoting Muslim socio-cultural uplift in his home province of Punjab, and was one of the first twenty or so Punjabi princes and nobles to donate funds for the establishment of the new University College, Punjab (later to develop into the University of the Punjab) in 1870.

== Successors ==
Nawab Muhammad Hayat had many offspring, and two of them, from his senior wife Zainab Khatun, daughter of S. Ghulam Jilani (a minister in Kapurthala State), were to achieve particular distinction and fame in years to come: Nawab Sir Liaqat Hayat Khan (1887–1945) and Nawabzada Sikandar Hayat Khan (1892–1942). Another son, Sardar Barkat Hyat Khan (1901–1977), is buried in the family cemetery at Wah.
