= Alfred William Begbie =

British civil servant in India (1801–1873)

Alfred William Begbie (1801–1873) was a British civil servant in India.

== Biography ==
Alfred William Begbie was born in 1801 at Hendon, Middlesex England. His parents were Peter Begbie & Frances (Jones) Begbie. He was nominated to East India Company College, 14 January 1818. He passed the Public Examination with great credit from College at Haileybury in Hertfordshire. on 28 May 1818. He was awarded prize in Bengali and great credit in other departments in the Public Examination at East India Company College. on 3 December 1819.

Begbie was appointed as Assistant to Magistrate of Northern Division of Bundelcund. on 16 February 1821. On 10 August 1822 Begbie was appointed as Register of Civil Court of Northern Division of Bundelcund.

Begbie 26 November 1825 Begbie was appointed Deputy Collector of Banda. On 2 June 1837 he was appointed as Civil & Session Judge of Mynpoorie by lieutenant Governors of the North-Western Provinces. During January to June 1853 (at least) he was Judge at the Nizāmat ʿAdālat of North-Western Provinces. From 10 October 1853 to 7 November 1853 he held position of Lieutenant-Governor of the North-Western Provinces as an In charge (acting).

== Family ==
Begbie married Margaret Anna Grant at Allahabad on 30 August 1825. Alfred and Margaret had two daughters, Frances Charlotte Begbie born in 1825 and Emelia Georgeana Begbie born in 1826. Margaret Anna (Grant) Begbie died on 23 June 1828 at Humeerpore, India.

Alfred married Charlotte Augusta Ricketts in 1831 at Humeerpore, Bengal, India.

Charlotte Augusta (Ricketts) Begbie died in 1833 at Zillah, Bengal, India.

Alfred William Begbie married Margaret Watt (eldest daughter of the Isaac Watt, Esq., of Logie, Angusshire, Scotland) at Allahabad on 22 February 1836.

Alfred and Margaret (Watt) Begbie had one daughter, Gertrude Emma Begbie who was born 20 February 1842.

Margaret (Watt) Begbie died in December 1842 and was buried 14 December 1842 at Landour, Bengal, India.

Alfred William Begbie married Lucy Sharp in 1848 at Simla, Bengal, India.

Alfred and Lucy (Sharp) had one son, Alfred John Begbie who was born 21 October 1849 at Chr. Agra, Bengal, India.

The England Census of 1861 records: Alfred W Begbie age 59, occupation: Bengal Civil Service Retired, and his wife, Lucy Begbie age 57, and their children: Gertrude Emma Begbie age 19, Alfred John Begbie age 11, and their grandson, Alexander William D Campbell age 12 are living at Lansdowne Calvery Park Gardens, Tonbridge, Kent, England. The household employs three female servants and one male servant.

The England Census of 1871 records: Alfred W Begbie age 69, born Hendon, Middlesex, occupation: Bengal Civil Service, and his wife, Lucy Begbie age 61, born Coventry Warwickshire, and their son Alfred J Begbie age 21, born East Indies, occupation: Undergraduate, are living at Tunbridge Wells, Tunbridge, Kent, England. Visiting them is Frederick A Sarthan age 20, born Manchester, Lancashire, occupation: Undergraduate. The household employs three female and one male servant.

Alfred William Begbie age 71, died 5 June 1873 at Tunbridge Wells, Kent, England. He left effects valued at under £14,000.

Government offices
Preceded by James Thomason	Lieutenant Governor of the North-Western Provinces; Acting; 10 October 1853 – 7 November 1853	Succeeded by J. R. Colvin
