= John Russell Colvin =

English colonial administrator (1807–1857)

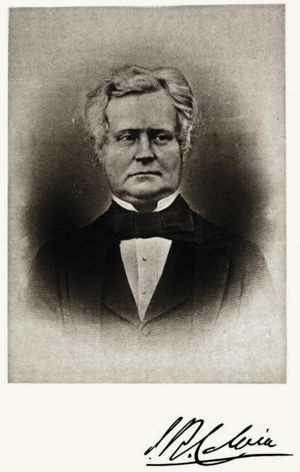

Lieutenant-Governor of the North-Western Provinces
- In office 7 November 1853 – 9 September 1857
- Governors General: The Marquess of Dalhousie; The Earl Canning
- Preceded by: James Thomason
- Succeeded by: Hugh Fraser

Personal details
- Born: 29 May 1807 Calcutta, Bengal Presidency
- Died: 9 September 1857 (aged 50) Agra, North-Western Provinces
- Education: East India Company College

John Russell Colvin (29 May 1807 – 9 September 1857) was a British administrator of the East India Company, and Lieutenant-Governor of the North-Western Provinces from 1853 until his death from cholera during the Indian Rebellion of 1857.

== Biography ==
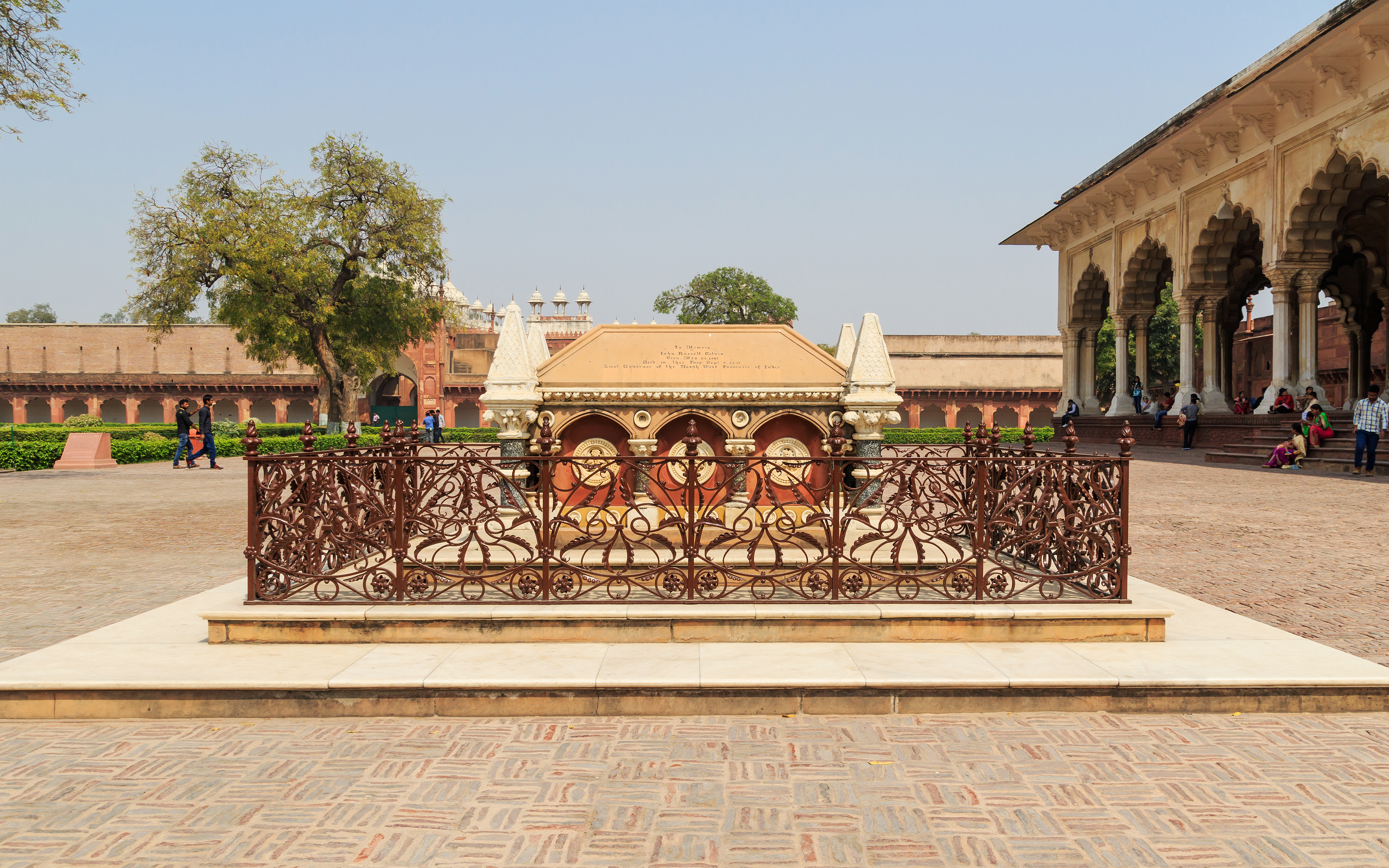
Tomb of John Russell Colvin inside the Red Fort of Agra.

Colvin was born in Calcutta, then part of the Bengal Presidency, the second son and fourth child of James Colvin (born 1768), a merchant with Colvin, Bazett & Co. of London and Calcutta. The Colvin family were a prominent Anglo-Indian family of Scottish descent. He was educated at the East India Company College in Hertfordshire, England and entered the service of the British East India Company in 1826.

In 1836 he became private secretary to Lord Auckland at the time of the First Anglo-Afghan War of 1837, and named his son after him. From 1846 to 1849, Colvin served as Commissioner of Tenasserim, in British (Lower) Burma.

In 1853 Lord Dalhousie appointed him lieutenant-governor of the North-West Provinces of India. In 1857, at the start of the Indian Rebellion of 1857, Colvin was at Agra with only a weak British regiment and a native battery, not enough force to prevail against the mutineers. Colvin issued a proclamation to the 'natives' that was censured at the time for its clemency, but it was similar to the approach of Sir Henry Lawrence, later followed by Lord Canning. Colvin died shortly before the fall of Delhi. (Note: Colvin's diaries are held in the European Manuscripts Section at the India Records Office in London.)

His body could not be carried out of the Agra Fort (which after the fall of the Mughals, the British establishment in India converted into a military garrison). The selection of the burial location is often criticized for the insensitivity, considering the significance of the place. Within the sprawling palace-fort complex, the tomb is located in the front of the Diwan-i-Am (Hall of Public Audience) where the Peacock Throne was placed.

== Family ==
Colvin married Emma Sophia, daughter of Wetenhall Sneyd, a vicar in England; they had ten children, many of whom continued the family connection with India. Bazett Wetenhall, Elliott Graham, and Walter Mytton all passed distinguished careers in India, and a fourth, Clement Sneyd, C.S.I., was secretary of the public works department of the India Office in London. The third son, Auckland, named after Lord Auckland, was lieutenant-governor of the North-West Provinces and Oudh, and also served in Egypt. He co-founded the Colvin Taluqdars' College in Lucknow; he also published a biography of his father in the Rulers of India series in 1895, and in 1905 gave a stained glass East window to the church of St. Mary at Soham, both as a thanksgiving for the termination of the Second Boer War, and as a permanent memorial to his father.

Colvin's elder brother, Bazett David, in 1847 inherited their father's estate at The Grove, Little Bealing, near Ipswich, which thus became the childhood home of Sidney Colvin, who grew up to be a critic, curator, and great friend of Robert Louis Stevenson.

Colvin's granddaughter Brenda (1897–1981) was an important landscape architect, author of standard works in the field and a force behind its professionalisation. She had no children, but another of Colvin's grandchildren founded his own line: Clement Sneyd's son ended up as Admiral Sir Ragnar Colvin, KBE, CB, and fathered John Horace Ragnar Colvin, the Cold War diplomat. The most recent generation is the Australian journalist Mark Colvin and Major General James Balfour CBE of the Royal Green Jackets.

== Notes ==
Government offices
Preceded by A. W. Begbie (acting)	Lieutenant Governor of the North-Western Provinces; 7 November 1853 – 9 September 1857	Succeeded by E. A. Reade (acting)
