= George Bruce Malleson =

British army officer in Colonial India

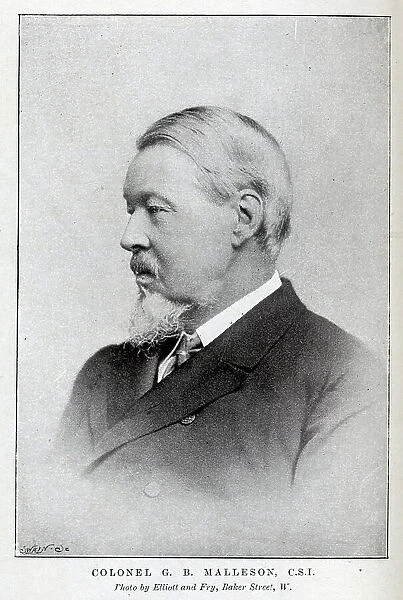
Malleson in 1895

Colonel George Bruce Malleson CSI (8 May 1825 – 1 March 1898) was a Bengal Army officer and historian.

== Biography ==
George Bruce Malleson was born on 8 May 1825 in Wimbledon, London, the son of John Malleson. Educated at Wimbledon and Winchester, he obtained a cadetship in the Bengal Army's Bengal Native Infantry in 1842, and served in the Second Anglo-Burmese War. His subsequent appointments were in the civil line, the last being that of guardian to the young maharaja of Mysore Chamarajendra Wadiyar X from 1869 to 1877. He retired from the military at the rank of colonel in 1877, having been created C.S.I. in the 1872 Birthday Honours.

He was a prolific writer, his first work to attract attention being the famous Red Pamphlet, published at Calcutta in 1857, when the Sepoy Mutiny was at its height. He continued, and considerably rewrote the History of the Indian Mutiny 1857-8 (6 vols., 1878–1880), which was begun but left unfinished by Sir John Kaye. Among his other books the most valuable are History of the French in India (2nd ed., 1893) and The Decisive Battles of India (3rd ed., 1888).

He authored the biographies of the Mughal Emperor Akbar, the French governor-general Dupleix and the British officer Robert Clive for the Rulers of India series.

He died at 27 West Cromwell Road, London, on 1 March 1898.

== Works ==
- Charles Allen (of the Bengal Civil Service); George Bruce Malleson (1858). A few words anent the 'red' pamphlet (i.e. The mutiny of the Bengal army, by G.B. Malleson) by one who has served under the marquis of Dalhousie (i.e. C. Allen).
- History of the Indian Mutiny, 1857–1858: Commencing from the close of the second volume of Sir John Kaye's History of the Sepoy War. Full text online at ibiblio.org (All six volumes, including the first two originally by Sir John Kaye, in HTML form, complete, chapter-by-chapter, with all illustrations, footnotes and a combined index)
  - Volume I. 1878.
  - Volume III. 1880.
  - Volume V. 1889.
- The Decisive Battles of India from 1746 to 1849. Pub. 1883. Full text online at ibiblio.org (In HTML form, complete, chapter-by-chapter, with all illustrations and footnotes)
- The Indian Mutiny of 1857. 1891. Full text online at archive.org. Malleson's own condensed version of the six-volume history.
- Akbar and the Rise of the Mughal Empire. Pub. 1896. Full text online at ibiblio.org (In HTML form, complete, chapter-by-chapter, with all illustrations and footnotes)
- History of the French in India 1893 (2nd revised ed.)
- Dupleix and the Struggle for India by the European Nations 1899
- History of Afghanistan, from the Earliest Period to the Outbreak of the War of 1878. Pub. 1879. 2nd ed. London: W.H. Allen & Co. A translation of this work was used for training British military interpreters in the Pashto language.
- Loudon: A Sketch of the Military Life of Gideon Ernest, Freiherr von Loudon. 1884.
- Ambushes and Surprises. 1885.
- The Refounding of the German Empire 1848–1871. 1893. OCLC 935202518.

== Other sources ==
- Lloyd, Ernest Marsh (1901). "Malleson, George Bruce" . In Lee, Sidney (ed.). Dictionary of National Biography (1st supplement). London: Smith, Elder & Co.
