= Edwin A. Colvin =

American politician

Edwin A. Colvin (March 20, 1927 – January 26, 2015) was an American politician and building contractor.

Born in North Bennington, Vermont, Colvin served in the United States Army Air Forces. He worked at Stanley Tools in Shaftsbury, Vermont and was a building contractor. Colvin served in the Vermont House of Representatives from 1972 to 1985 and was a Republican. Colvin died in Bennington, Vermont at the Vermont Veterans Home.
