= Owen Tudor Burne =

Major-General Sir Owen Tudor Burne GCIE, KCSI
- Born: 12 April 1837; Plymouth
- Died: 3 February 1909 (aged 71); Maida Vale

Major-General Sir Owen Tudor Burne, GCIE KCSI (12 April 1837 – 3 February 1909) was a British major-general known for his contributed volume Clyde and Strathnairn for the Rulers of India series published in 1891.

Born at Plymouth on 12 April 1837, he was eleventh child in a family of nineteen children of the Rev. Henry Thomas Burne (1799–1865), M.A., of Trinity College, Cambridge, by his wife Knightley Goodman (1805–1878), daughter of Captain Marriott, Royal Horse Guards.

Burne was commissioned into the 20th (The East Devonshire) Regiment of Foot in 1855 at the age of 18. He served in the Crimean War (1854–1856), and took part in 15 actions during the suppression of the Indian Mutiny (1857–1859), including the siege and capture of Lucknow.

In 1861 he became Military Secretary to Sir Hugh Rose (later Lord Strathnairn), Commander-in-Chief India, and from 1868 to 1872 was Private Secretary to Earl Mayo, Viceroy of India. From 1876 to 1877, he was Private Sectretary to another Viceroy of India, Lord Lytton. Burne was a member of the Council of India from 1887 to 1897. He was promoted major-general in 1889, and in 1896 was made Knight Grand Commander of the Order of the Indian Empire (GCIE).

Burne died after a long illness at his house in Sutherland Avenue, Maida Vale, on 3 February 1909. He was buried with military honours at Christchurch Priory, Hampshire.
