= Dora Colvin =

American truck driver

Dora Colvin is an American woman truck driver. In over four decades, Colvin has driven 2 million miles without an accident, in a male-dominated occupation.

== Biography ==
Colvin grew up in remote North Dakota on a farm, where she drove a truck. Today, she lives in Udall, Kansas. Her original occupation was as a teacher, and she first started driving with her husband, Butch, during the summer. She worked in a team with Butch for 18 years before they retired in 2010. The Colvins have four children and six grandchildren.

In 1965, Colvin became the first woman to hold a commercial driver's license (CDL) in Kansas. In 1972, she became the first woman to drive for the produce company Stanley Dilley, and in 1992 was the first woman to drive for the chemical hauler Wynne Tank Lines.

In 2004, Colvin and her husband were named Company Team of the Year for CFI. In April 2006, Colvin became the first woman to be named Company Equipment Driver of the Year by Truckload Carriers Association and sponsored by Truckers News. On April 7, 2006, Colvin was mentioned on Paul Harvey's short radio newscast on ABC stations across the nation.
