= Sahanpur =

Town in Uttar Pradesh, India

- Town
- Location in Uttar Pradesh, India Sahanpur (India)
- Coordinates: 29.633°N 78.323°E
- Country: India
- State: Uttar Pradesh
- District: Bijnor
- Founder: Padarath Singh

Government
  - Chairman: Khursheed Mansoori

Population (2001)
  - Total: 18,349

Languages
  - Official: Hindi
- Time zone: UTC+5:30 (IST)
- Postal code: 246749
- Vehicle registration: UP 20

Sahanpur is a town and a nagar panchayat in Bijnor district in the Indian state of Uttar Pradesh.

== Demographics ==
As of 2001, the India census showed Sahanpur had a population of 18,349. Males constitute 52% of the population and females 48%. Sahanpur has an average literacy rate of 37%, lower than the national average of 59.5%: male literacy is 42%, and female literacy is 32%. In Sahanpur, 21% of the population is under 6 years of age.

== See also ==
- Mursan
- Sahaspur
- Kuchesar
