= James Thomason =

British administrator and civil servant

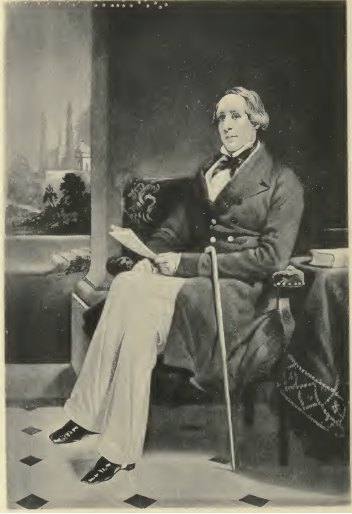

Lieutenant-Governor of the North-Western Provinces
- In office 22 December 1843 – 10 October 1853
- Governors General: The Lord Ellenborough; The Viscount Hardinge; The Marquess of Dalhousie
- Preceded by: Sir George Russell Clerk
- Succeeded by: John Russell Colvin

Personal details
- Born: 3 May 1804 Great Shelford, England, United Kingdom
- Died: 27 September 1853 (aged 49) Bareilly, United Provinces of Agra and Oudh
- Education: East India Company College

James Thomason (3 May 1804 – 17 September 1853) was a British administrator of the East India Company and Lieutenant-Governor of the North-Western Provinces between 1843 and 1853.

== Early life ==
The son of Thomas Truebody Thomason, a British cleric in Bengal from 1808, and his first wife Elizabeth Fawcett, he was born on 3 May 1804 in Little Shelford. He was educated in England from 1814, at Aspenden Hall School, Hertfordshire, where he knew Thomas Babington Macaulay, living with his paternal grandmother Mrs Dornford, and Charles Simeon. Simeon, in Cambridge, his godfather and effective guardian, gave him a great deal of attention.

In 1818 Thomason became a pupil in 1819 at Stanstead Park, near Racton in Sussex, of George Hodson, who was tutoring Albert Way, son of Lewis Way in what became a small class of six boys that included Samuel Wilberforce. He moved on to Haileybury College.

== Career in India ==
James Thomason returned to India in 1822. He held numerous positions there, including magistrate-collector, settlement officer in Azamgarh (1832–37), and foreign secretary to the government of India (1842–43). In 1843 he was named Lieutenant-Governor of the North-Western Provinces, a post he held for ten years. By 1853 he had also established a system of 897 locally supported elementary schools in centrally located villages that provided a vernacular education for children throughout the region. He was appointed as governor of Madras by Queen Victoria, but did not survive to assume the post. He died on 27 September 1853, at Bareilly, India, where he was staying with Maynie Hay, his married daughter.

== Legacy ==
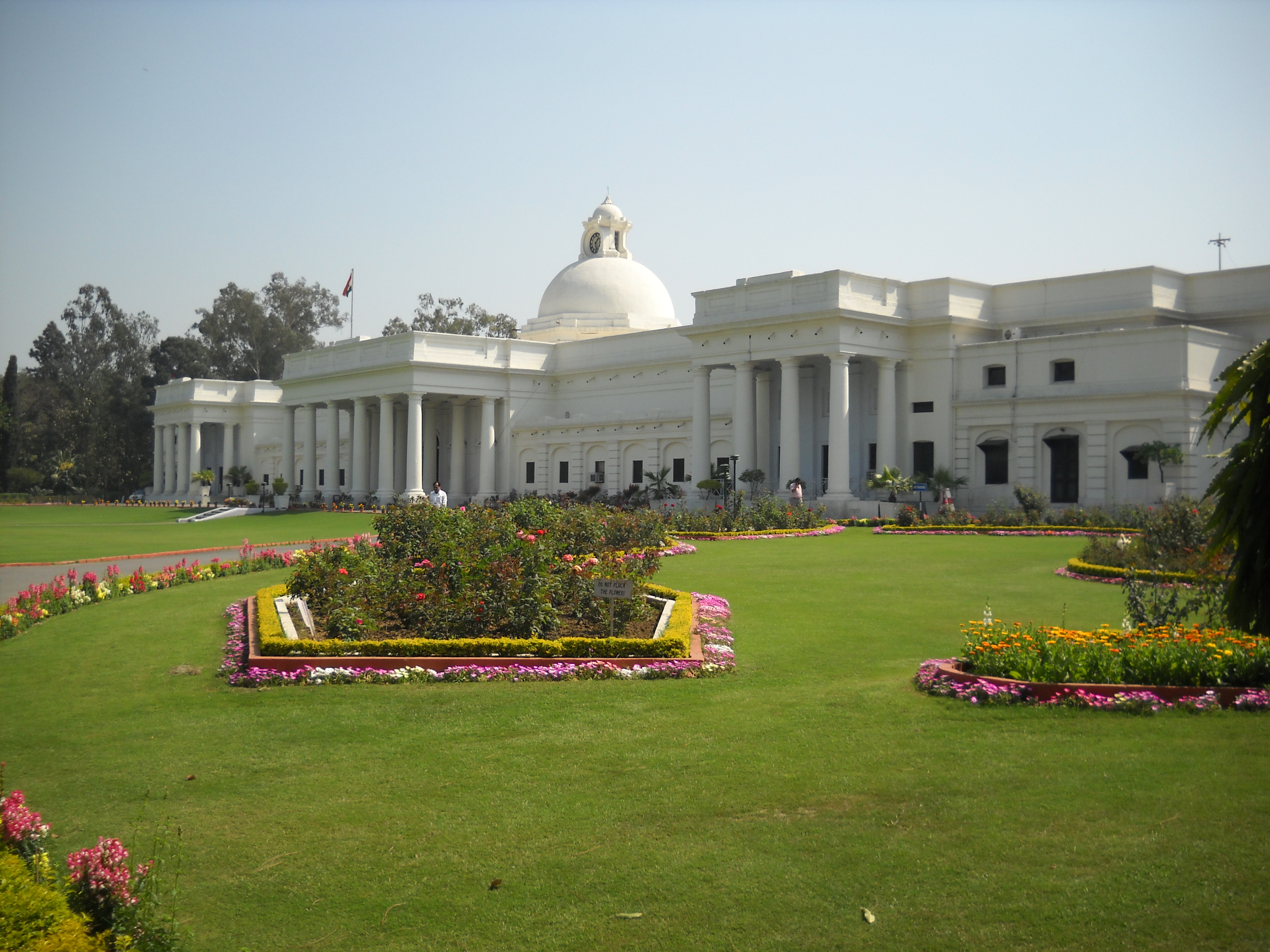
The Thomason College of Civil Engineering Roorkee, renamed the Indian Institute of technology Roorkee in 2001.

James Thomason proposed that a civil engineering college be established at Roorkee. In 1847, the first civil engineering college in India begun in part to train engineers for the Ganges Canal was opened and named the Thomason College of Civil Engineering in Thomason's memory by Proby Cautley, the designer of the canal. It gained university status in 1949 It is now the Indian Institute of Technology Roorkee.

Government offices
| Preceded by Sir G. R. Clerk | Lieutenant Governor of North-Western Provinces; 22 December 1843 – 10 October 1853 | Succeeded by A. W. Begbie (acting) |
