= Elliot Colvin (died 1940) =

Sir Elliot Graham Colvin

Sir Elliot Graham Colvin, KCSI (1861–1940) was a British administrator in India. A member of the Indian Civil Service, he served in the Political Department of the Government of India.

== Life and career ==
Elliot Colvin was born on 18 July 1861, the son of Bazett Colvin, ICS. He was educated at Charterhouse, where he was a scholar and an exhibitioner, and King’s College, Cambridge.

Colvin joined the Indian Civil Service in 1882. He was an assistant magistrate in the Bengal in 1883, then joined the Political Department in 1884 as an assistant. In 1887, he became private secretary to the Governor of Bengal.

He was listed in the India Office List (1911) as agent to the Governor General, Rajputana in 1882.

== Family ==
He married Ethel Augusta on 7 December 1889 at St. Paul's Cathedral, Calcutta (now Kolkata).

== Honours ==
C.S.I. 1906.
