= Brenda Colvin =

Landscape architect

- Born: Brenda Gwyneth Stewart Colvin; 8 June 1897; Simla, British India
- Died: 27 January 1981 (aged 83); Witney, Oxfordshire, England
- Occupation: landscape architect

Brenda Colvin CBE (1897–1981) was a British landscape architect, author of landmark works in the field such as Land and Landscape. She was a force behind the professionalisation of landscape design and co-founded the Institute of Landscape Architects. She was part of the Colvin family, which had long ties to the British Raj.

== Biography ==
Colvin was born in 1897 in India where her father, Sir Elliot Graham Colvin, was a senior administrator in Kashmir and Rajputana. In 1919, Colvin began training in garden design from Madeline Agar at Swanley Horticultural College (now Hadlow College). Agar and Colvin worked together on Wimbledon Common.

Colvin set up her own practice in 1922, which is now the longest running in Britain. In the early years of her career, she worked mainly on private gardens and designed nearly 300, including one at the Manor House in Sutton Courtenay, former home of the socialite Norah Lindsay, and one at Burwarton. She also designed a large garden addition for Archduke Charles Albert Habsburg at Zywiec in Poland.

Colvin co-founded the Institute of Landscape Architects in 1929 (later the Landscape Institute). She served on its Council for 47 years and became its president in 1951.

Colvin wrote Trees for Town and Country in 1947 with Jacqueline Tyrwhitt. Her book Land and Landscape (1948, revised 1970) was developed from notes of lectures she had given for the Architectural Association.

In the 1960s Colvin shared an office with Sylvia Crowe, later also president of the ILA (1957–1959). In 1945, immediately after the end of World War II, Colvin offered a room in her Baker Street offices to Crowe from which Crowe could resume a career in private practice.

Colvin also worked on industrial landscaping, siting factories and reservoirs, New Towns, and created landscapes around the Drakelow C Power Station and the University of East Anglia. One of her most historically significant garden designs still remains at Aberystwyth University which is now listed on the Register of Historic Parks and Gardens of Special Historic Interest in England, the listing states:

The landscaping of the University of Wales, Aberystwyth campuses, particularly the earlier Penglais campus, is of exceptional historic interest as one of the most important modern landscaping schemes in Wales...One section of the Penglais campus was designed by the well known landscape architect Brenda Colvin and is one of the very few of her schemes to have survived. A number of women have played a key role in the development and planting of the whole site.

=== Later Years ===
In 1969, Hal Moggridge joined Colvin's landscape design firm as partner; the firm continues today under their joint names. Colvin was awarded a CBE award as part of the New Years Honours in 1973. She continued her landscape practice into her eighties.

== Legacy ==
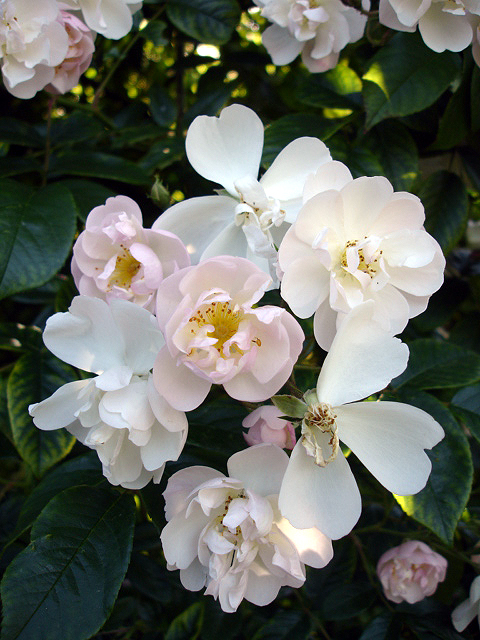
Rosa 'Brenda Colvin'

Her own garden was at Filkins in the Cotswolds in Gloucestershire, and is now the office of Colvin and Moggridge. Sometimes the company opens it via the National Garden Scheme.

In 1970, Colvin bred a rose varietal named 'Brenda Colvin'. The blooms are light pink and have a strong fragrance.

In 2022, Luca Csepely-Knorr led a UKRI-funded research project called 'Women of the Welfare Landscape' which explored Colvin's work and network.

As of 2024, only three of Colvin's gardens are known to remain.

== Partial list of listed gardens ==
- Steeple Manor, Steeple, Dorset (1924, grade II)
- Sutton Courtenay Manor, Sutton Courtenay, Oxfordshire (1948–1951, c.1960, grade II)
- Morgans Junior School, Hertford, Hertfordshire (1948–1949, grade II*)
- Salisbury Crematorium, Salisbury, Wiltshire (1956–1958, grade II)

== Written work ==
- Trees for Town and Country, written with Jacqueline Tyrwhitt. London : Lund Humphries, 1947.
- Land and Landscape. London: John Murray, 1948. Colvin, Brenda (1970). 2nd edition. J. Murray. ISBN 0719518008.
- Wonder in a World. London: The Cygnet Press, 1977.
