= Sidney Colvin =

British curator and literary and art critic (1845–1927)

Sir Sidney Colvin
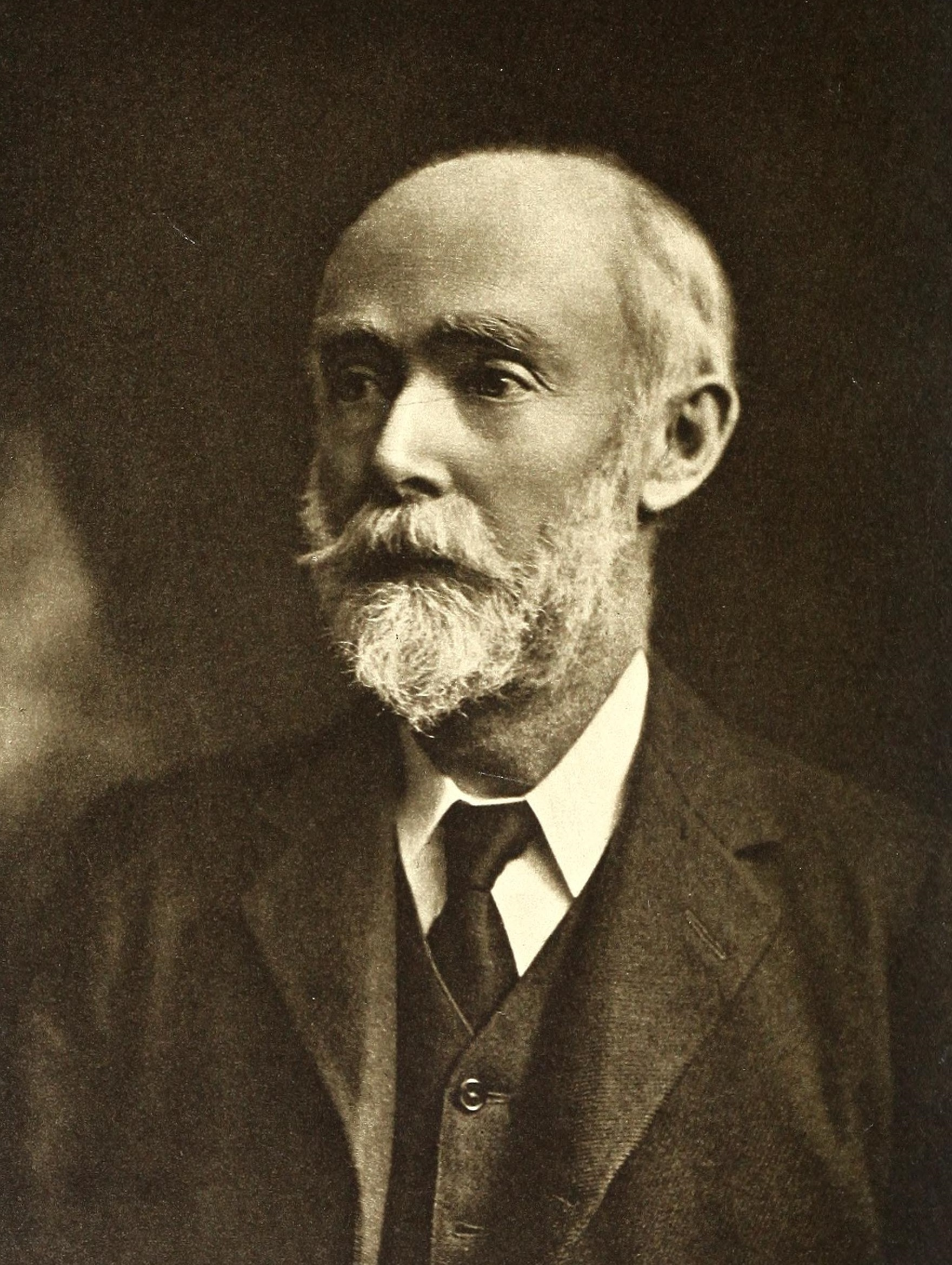
- Born: 18 June 1845; West Norwood, England
- Died: 11 May 1927 (aged 81)
- Citizenship: United Kingdom
- Education: Trinity College, Cambridge
- Occupation: Critic
- Spouse: Frances Sitwell (m. 1903; died 1924)
- Writing career
- Period: Victorian era

Signature
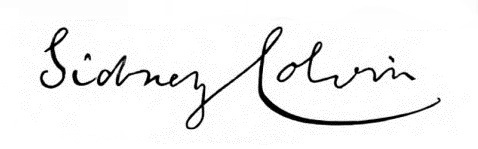

Sir Sidney Colvin (18 June 1845 – 11 May 1927) was a British curator and literary and art critic, part of the illustrious Anglo-Indian Colvin family. He is primarily remembered for his friendship with Robert Louis Stevenson.

== Family and early life ==
He was born on 18 June 1845 in West Norwood, in what is now London, at St. John's Lodge on Knight's Hill, a nine-bedroom, twenty-one acre estate, to Bazett David Colvin, an East India merchant, and Mary Steuart, daughter of William Butterworth Bayley, Chairman of the East India Company Both sides of his family were connected to British India, his father as a partner in the trading company of Crawford, Colvin, and Co., with offices in Calcutta and London. (This connected the family with Robert Wigram Crawford, the Whig politician.) His uncle John Russell Colvin, lieutenant-governor of the North-West Provinces during the mutiny of 1857, gave him ten cousins, including the lawyer Walter Mytton and Auckland, also lieutenant-governor of the North-West Provinces (and Oudh).

Sidney Colvin's childhood was spent at The Grove, Little Bealings, Suffolk, as Bazett David inherited the estate in 1847 from his father James. The house and estate had literary and artistic connections: James had purchased it in 1824 from Perry Nursey, the landscape painter and teacher of Thomas Churchyard; Nursey had often entertained David Wilkie RA at Little Bealings, and was friends with Edward Fitzgerald, translator of The Rubayat of Omar Khayyam.

== Education and career ==
A scholar of Trinity College, Cambridge, Sidney Colvin became a fellow of his college in 1868. In 1873 he was Slade Professor of Fine Art, and was appointed in the next year to the directorship of the Fitzwilliam Museum.

He wrote numerous articles on fine arts subjects (including Sandro Botticelli, Albrecht Dürer, Fine Arts, Leonardo da Vinci and Michelangelo) for the ninth edition (1875–89) of the Encyclopædia Britannica.

In 1878, 114 Old Master engravings, which Sidney Colvin had purchased for the museum from London art dealer A. W. Thibaudeau, were stolen by a hansom cab driver. Although the driver was tracked down and charged, the engravings were never recovered and Sidney Colvin was required to cover their cost. Sidney Colvin paid the £1,537 10s to Thibaudeau from his own salary in instalments for many years, having initially to borrow £400 from Robert Louis Stevenson; a debt which he was still repaying to his friend in 1884.

In 1884, he moved to London on his appointment as keeper of prints and drawings in the British Museum. His chief publications are lives of Walter Savage Landor (1881) and Keats (1887), in the English Men of Letters series; editions of the letters of Keats (1887); A Florentine Picture-Chronicle (1898), and Early History of Engraving in England (1905).

In both art and of literature, Sidney Colvin was regarded as an influential figure whose taste, knowledge, and standards extended his influence beyond his published work.

== Frances Jane Sitwell and Robert Louis Stevenson ==
In the early 1870s Sidney Colvin met the woman who was to become his wife, many decades later. Frances Jane (1839–1924), Née Fetherstonhaugh, was married to Rev. Albert Hurt Sitwell (1834–1894), a Church of England vicar (variously in Calcutta, Stepney, and Thanet). The Sitwells had two sons: one died as a child, and one lived to early adulthood, Frances Albert 'Bertie' Sitwell (1862–1881). Their marriage was unhappy, so they lived apart and she earned her living as an essayist.

In late summer 1873, Sidney Colvin became friends with Robert Louis Stevenson, then a young man and an unpublished author. Soon after their first meeting he had placed Robert Louis Stevenson's first paid contribution, an essay, "Roads", in The Portfolio. Both men were attracted to Frances Jane Sitwell; Robert Louis Stevenson wrote to her for years. Despite or because of this attraction, the men remained firm friends. Robert Louis Stevenson dedicated Travels with a Donkey in the Cévennes to Sidney Colvin, who became his literary adviser.

Sidney Colvin was a significant editor of Robert Louis Stevenson's, preparing the Edinburgh edition of his works (1894–97); the Vailima Letters (1899), which Robert Louis Stevenson chiefly addressed to him; and the posthumous collection of Letters (2 volumes, London, 1900). These publications made Sidney Colvin an authority on Robert Louis Stevenson's life and work. He also wrote the sketch of Robert Louis Stevenson for the Dictionary of National Biography (vol. liv.), and was to have written an authoritative Life, intended for publication simultaneously with the Letters, but was obliged to relinquish the task to Graham Balfour.

Frances Jane Sitwell and Sidney Colvin married on 7 July 1903, following the death of her husband and his mother. They had 20 years of married life, before she died on 1 August 1924. The couple were the subject of a 1928 biography by E. V. Lucas. According to the literary critic R. L. Calder, the Colvins were models for Mr and Mrs Barton Trafford in W. Somerset Maugham's 1930 Cakes and Ale.

== Later life and death ==
Sidney Colvin was knighted in 1911. The citation reads

Sidney Colvin, Esq., D.Litt
Keeper of Prints and Drawings at the British Museum since 1884 and member of many learned bodies. Slade Professor of Fine Art at Cambridge from 1873 to 1895, author of several publications on literature and the fine arts and contributor to the "Encyclopædia Britannica" and "Dictionary of National Biography" &c. Born in 1845.
