= Walter Mytton Colvin =

British lawyer and colonial administrator (1847-1908)

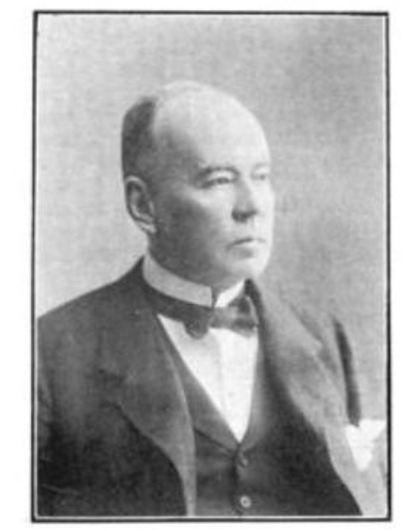
- Born: 13 September 1847; Moulmein, Burma
- Died: 16 December 1908 (aged 61); Allahabad, British India
- Education: Rugby School; Trinity Hall, Cambridge
- Occupation: Jurist
- Spouse: Annie Money (m. 1873)
- Children: 3

Sir Walter Mytton Colvin (13 September 1847 – 16 December 1908) was a British lawyer and colonial administrator, part of the illustrious Anglo-Indian Colvin family.

== Biography ==
Walter Colvin, Sir Auckland Colvin's youngest brother, was born in Moulmein in 1847. He was educated at Rugby and Trinity Hall, Cambridge, where he was captain of the boats. He was called to the bar at the Middle Temple in 1871, went out to Allahabad in the following year, and built up a vast practice as a criminal lawyer. He served for several biennial terms as a nominated member of the provincial legislature. His insight into the manners, customs, and thoughts of the people was of great value to the police commission of 1902–3, of which he was a member; Andrew Henderson Leith Fraser was its head. Mainly for this service he was knighted in 1904.

== Family ==
In 1873 he married Annie, daughter of Wigram E. Money, and had a family of three daughters.

One of his cousins was Sir Sidney Colvin, a curator and literary and art critic, and another relative was John Russell Colvin, who rose to be lieutenant-governor of the North-West Provinces of British India.

He died at Allahabad on 16 December 1908, and was buried in the European cemetery there. There is a tablet to his memory in Milland Church, Hampshire.
