= Auckland Colvin =

English colonial administrator (1838–1908)

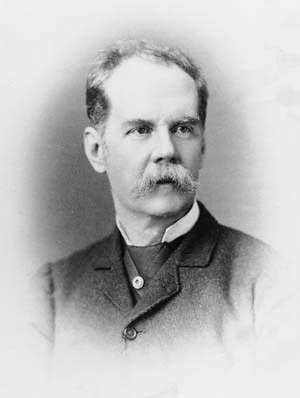
Sir Auckland Colvin, by unknown photographer

Sir Auckland Colvin KCSI KCMG CIE (1838–1908) was a colonial administrator in India and Egypt, born into the Anglo-Indian Colvin family. He was comptroller general in Egypt (1880–1882), and financial adviser to the Khedive (1883–1887). From 1883 to 1892 he was back in India, first as financial member of council, and then as Lieutenant-governor of the North-West Provinces (as his father had been) and Oudh. He founded Colvin Taluqdars' College in Lucknow.

== Early life and family ==
Colvin, born at Calcutta on 8 March 1838, was third son of the ten children of John Russell Colvin, an Anglo-Indian administrator, by his wife Emma Sophia, daughter of Wetenhall Sneyd, vicar of Newchurch, Isle of Wight. Three of his brothers, Bazett Wetenhall Colvin, Elliott Graham Colvin, and Sir Walter Mytton Colvin, all passed distinguished careers in India, and a fourth, Clement Sneyd Colvin, was secretary of the public works department of the India Office in London.

He was born when his father was private secretary to George Eden, 1st Earl of Auckland, then Governor-General of India, and was named after him. In retirement he wrote a biography of his father, who rose to be lieutenant-governor of the North-Western Provinces and died in the Mutiny.

The year the biography was published, the 5th Baron Auckland had a son, and named him Frederick Colvin George Eden, the first and only time Colvin was chosen as a name in that family. In 1905 Auckland Colvin gave a stained glass East window to the church of St. Mary at Earl Soham, both as a thanksgiving for the termination of the Second Boer War, and as a permanent memorial to his father.

He was educated at Eton College from 1850, and then from 1854 at the East India College.

== Early career in India ==
Colvin arrived in India on 17 January 1858 and was posted to the Agra provinces. After serving the usual district novitiate, Auckland went to headquarters in May 1864 as under secretary in the home, and afterwards in the foreign, department of the government of India. He returned to his own province in July 1869 as a settlement officer, and did good work in the revision of the Allahabad district settlement. He officiated as secretary to the government of the North-West Provinces in April 1873, and from the following June as commissioner of excise and stamps. The lieutenant-governor, Sir George Couper, resented some criticism of the local government in the Pioneer (Allahabad), which was attributed to Colvin's pen or inspiration. In the spring of 1877, Couper sent Colvin back to district work as collector of Basti. From November 1877 he officiated for a short period as commissioner of inland customs under the government of India, and he was afterwards collector of Bijnaur.

== Move to Egypt ==
Colvin's opportunity came when in January 1878 he was transferred for employment in Egypt, serving first as head of the cadastral survey, and then from 24 May as British commissioner of the debt, in place of Major Evelyn Baring (afterwards Lord Cromer). Again in June 1880 he succeeded Major Baring as English controller of Egyptian finance, with M. de Blignières as his French colleague. From time to time he acted as British consul-general in Sir Edward Malet's absence, and he was acting for Malet when the mutiny of 9 September 1881 broke out. By his advice and persuasion the timorous Khedive Tewfik confronted Urabi, the rebel leader, in the square of the Abdin palace, and succeeded in postponing the insurrection.

In various ways, and not least by his work as Egyptian correspondent of the Pall Mall Gazette, he influenced public opinion at home, and forced the reluctant hands of Gladstone's government towards acceptance of responsibility in Egypt. Wilfrid Scawen Blunt, Colvin's bitterest opponent, in his Secret History of the English Occupation (1907), pays unwilling homage to the resource with which Colvin conducted the struggle. After the British occupation Colvin became financial adviser to the Khedive, who conferred on him the Grand Cordons of the Osmanieh and Medjidieh Orders. He was created K.C.M.G. in 1881.

== Mature career ==
When Lord Cromer became British agent in Egypt, Colvin succeeded him as financial member of the Viceroy's council in India in August 1883. Financial difficulties faced him. The war in Upper Burma and the danger of hostilities with Russia, consequent upon the Panjdeh Incident, were not only costly in themselves, but were followed by great capital outlay on improving the strategic position on the north-west frontier, and by increases of the British and native armies. With Sir Courtenay Ilbert, then legal member, Colvin minuted against this increase, and after retirement he complained that the military element in the council was disproportionately strong. The finances were also disturbed by the continued decline in the sterling value of the rupee, while suggestions made by the governor-general in council, at Colvin's instance, for seeking an international acceptance of bimetallism were treated by the British Cabinet at home, Colvin thought, with scant respect.

Although he caused a committee to be appointed under Sir Charles Elliott to recommend economies, he was compelled not only to suspend the Famine Insurance Fund, and to take toll of the provincial governments, but to increase taxation. In January 1886 he converted some annual licence duties in certain provinces into a general tax on non-agricultural incomes in excess of Rs. 500 per annum. This unpopular proceeding was immortalised in Kipling's Departmental Ditties by The Rupaiyat of Omar Kalvin, which represents the finance member as plying the begging-bowl among his European countrymen. In his last budget (1887–88) he increased the salt duty by twenty-five per cent, and imposed an export duty on petroleum.

Colvin welcomed his transfer on 21 November 1887 to Allahabad as Lieutenant-governor of the North-West Provinces and chief commissioner of Oudh, in succession to Sir Alfred Comyn Lyall. His father had been charged with "over-governing" the same provinces thirty years before, and the son resembled him in his personal attention to detail. To his influence were due good water supplies and drainage systems in the larger towns of what are now the United Provinces, several new hospitals, and the Colvin Taluqdars' school at Lucknow.

Towards the Indian National Congress he declared himself uncompromisingly hostile, both in allocutions at divisional durbars and in a published correspondence with Allan Octavian Hume, formerly of his own service, the "father" of the new movement (1885). Colvin resolutely rallied loyalist opinion against the Congress.

== Retirement ==
Created C.I.E. in Oct. 1883, he was gazetted a K.C.S.I. in May 1892, six months before retirement. In England, Colvin settled at Earl Soham Lodge, Framlingham, and took an active part in local affairs and charities. He mainly occupied himself with literature. He wrote the life of his father for the Rulers of India series (1895). His Making of Modern Egypt (1906), while dealing generously with the work of other Englishmen, says nothing of his own part in surmounting the crises of 1881 and 1882. The book was soon overshadowed by Lord Cromer's Modern Egypt (1908). From 1896 onward he was chairman of the Burma Railways, the Egyptian Delta Railway, and the Khedivial Mail Steamship Company, and was on the boards of other companies. He died at Suffolk House, Maple Road, Surbiton – the residence of his eldest daughter Emma Sophia Groome – on 24 March 1908. He was buried at Earl Soham.

He married on 4 August 1859 Charlotte Elizabeth (d 1865), daughter of Lieut.-general Charles Herbert, C.B., and had a son, who died in infancy, and three daughters, the middle of whom married the military commander Bindon Blood and whose portrait is held by the National Portrait Gallery.

Government offices
| Preceded by Sir Alfred Comyn Lyall | Lieutenant Governor of the North-Western Provinces and Chief Commissioner of Oudh; 21 November 1887 – 28 November 1892 | Succeeded by Sir Charles Haukes Todd Crosthwaite |
