= The Young Mr. Pitt =

- A scene from the film
- Directed by: Carol Reed
- Written by: Frank Launder; Sidney Gilliat; Viscount Castlerosse (additional dialogue and original novel)
- Starring: Robert Donat; Robert Morley; Phyllis Calvert; John Mills
- Cinematography: Freddie Young
- Edited by: R. E. Dearing
- Music by: Louis Levy
- Distributed by: 20th Century Fox
- Release date: 21 September 1942
- Running time: 118 minutes
- Country: United Kingdom
- Language: English
- Budget: £250,000

The Young Mr. Pitt is a 1942 British biographical film of the life of William Pitt the Younger and in particular his struggle against revolutionary France and Napoleon. It was directed by Carol Reed and stars Robert Donat, Robert Morley, Phyllis Calvert and John Mills. Made in black-and-white, it was produced by Edward Black and Maurice Ostrer for the British subsidiary of 20th Century Fox.

It was filmed as the Second World War was raging. Similar parallels with the struggle against Hitler's Germany were implied in That Hamilton Woman (aka Lady Hamilton, 1941), made by Alexander Korda in the United States with Laurence Olivier and Vivien Leigh in the leads. Several of the speeches which Pitt makes against Napoleon are actually the words of Churchill in relation to Hitler, in particular the "we stand alone" speech from 1940.

== Plot ==
In 1770, William Pitt the Elder gives a speech in Parliament strongly advising against war with the American colonies, and then advises his second son, William, to avoid seeking fame through war. Years later, the loss of America brings down the unpopular ministry of Charles James Fox and Lord North. Pitt the Younger is only 24, marginalized by his peers for advocating parliamentary reform, and with no majority in the House of Commons. Despite all this, King George III names him North's successor as Prime Minister.

Pitt tries to gain the influential Fox's support but is rebuffed. He is ridiculed in Parliament, but despite having no majority, refuses to resign. He is even subject to a night ambush by his enemies but noted boxers Dan Mendoza and Gentleman Jackson help drive the assailants away. Reassured by the boxers' claims of strong support for him amongst the general public, Pitt calls a new election on a platform of peace and prosperity, which gives him a majority. Against Fox's constant opposition, he then institutes reforms and strengthens the Royal Navy, whilst intermittently events in Napoleon Bonaparte's childhood and military training are shown.

The French Revolution erupts and France invades Belgium. With France and Britain both nominally committed to Dutch neutrality, Talleyrand fails to convince Pitt into an alliance with France or at least pro-French neutrality and a French invasion of the Dutch Republic soon afterwards triggers a British declaration of war. Public opinion turns against the war as early successes turn to defeats such as the Siege of Toulon, won by Napoleon's artillery knowledge, but even when Britain's continental allies fall, Pitt refuses to sue for peace.

Pitt's friend and fellow politician William Wilberforce continues to support peace negotiations and abstains from a vote on the matter. Via Melvill, an American intermediary, Talleyrand sends word to Pitt that French moderates are willing to make peace, but before Pitt can exploit this, Napoleon seizes power. Learning of this during one of his regular visits to Walmer Castle, Pitt realises Napoleon's desire is for world domination and commits himself totally to the arduous struggle ahead, sacrificing even his hopes for marriage to Eleanor Eden. He also discovers that he has neglected his personal finances and is now deeply in debt, though these debts are soon paid off by an unknown friend.

He institutes a bold but risky strategy, going on the offensive in the Mediterranean, and chooses Horatio Nelson over more senior admirals to lead the naval squadron assigned the task. Napoleon sails from Toulon to invade Egypt while Nelson's blockading ships are scattered by a gale. Meanwhile, Pitt collapses from overwork and is warned by his doctor about his health. Nelson finds and destroys the French fleet at the Battle of the Nile. The people cheer Pitt, but the war continues until Napoleon personally writes to George III and falsely claims that Pitt has refused his offers of peace negotiations. Pitt is forced to resign, just before receiving news of Eleanor's impending wedding. A peace treaty is signed, giving Napoleon time to build up his armies and his fleet, whilst Addington's administration naively hopes for a lasting peace and neglects Britain's defences.

Napoleon gathers his forces on the French coast facing England and popular opinion enables Pitt to depose the inept Addington, despite his doctor's warnings. He gains the support of the king and even of Fox as he rearms Britain and institutes a system of fencibles and militia for home defence. The decisive British victory at the Battle of Trafalgar puts an end to the invasion threat, though in a speech at the Guildhall Pitt states that victory has been achieved not just by him but the whole nation, while predicting that Britain will go on to save Europe.

== Cast ==
- Robert Donat as the Earl of Chatham / William Pitt
- Geoffrey Atkins as William Pitt as a boy
- Robert Morley as Charles James Fox
- Phyllis Calvert as Eleanor Eden
- John Mills as William Wilberforce
- Jean Cadell as Mrs. Sparry
- Raymond Lovell as George III
- Agnes Lauchlan as Queen Charlotte
- Felix Aylmer as Lord North
- Ian McLean as Henry Dundas
- Max Adrian as Richard Brinsley Sheridan
- A. Bromley Davenport as Sir Evan Nepean
- Herbert Lom (Note: His first English-speaking role) as Napoleon
- Albert Lieven as Talleyrand
- Stephen Haggard as Lord Nelson
- Stuart Lindsell as Earl Spencer
- Henry Hewitt as Addington
- Frederick Culley as Sir William Farquhar
- Frank Pettingell as Coachman
- Leslie Bradley as Gentleman Jackson
- Roy Emerton as Daniel Mendoza
- Hugh McDermott as Mr. Melvill
- James Harcourt as Bellamy (Note: Uncredited)
- Leslie Dwyer as Servant at Lord Auckland's
- Ronald Shiner as Man in Stocks
- Frederick Leister as Auckland
- Gibb McLaughlin as George Selwyn
- Jack Watling as Atkinson

== Production ==
Sidney Gilliat says he had a big fight with Carol Reed during the making of the film which resulted in Gilliat leaving the project.

== Reception ==
Bosley Crowther of The New York Times felt "the nature of the historical period in which this film is set and the evident fidelity of the authors to the facts of Mr. Pitt's life conspire to prevent this picture from having a sharp dramatic impact."

According to Kinematograph Weekly the film was one of the most popular at the British box office in 1942, after Mrs Miniver, First of the Few, How Green Was My Valley, Reap the Wild Wind, Holiday Inn, Captains of the Clouds, Sergeant York, One of Our Aircraft is Missing and Hatter's Castle.
