= Robert Eden, 3rd Baron Auckland =

British Anglican bishop (1799–1870)

The Right Reverend and Right Honourable The Lord Auckland
- Bishop of Bath and Wells
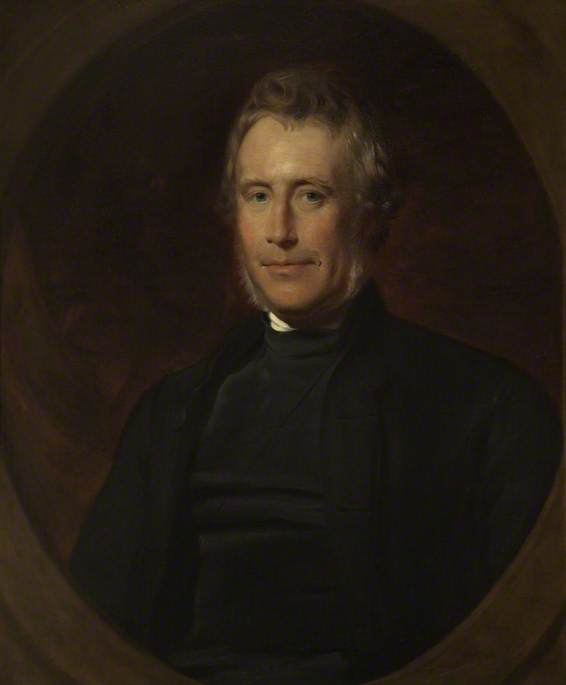
- Lord Auckland by George Richmond
- Diocese: Bath and Wells
- Installed: 2 June 1854
- Term ended: 6 September 1869
- Predecessor: Richard Bagot
- Successor: Lord Arthur Hervey
- Other post: Bishop of Sodor and Man (1847–1854)

Personal details
- Born: 10 July 1799 Eden Farm, Beckenham, Kent
- Died: 25 April 1870 (aged 70) Bishop's Palace, Wells, Somerset
- Denomination: Anglican
- Education: Eton College; Magdalene College, Cambridge
- Spouse: Mary Hurt (m. 1825)
- Parents: William Eden (father); Eleanor Elliot (mother)

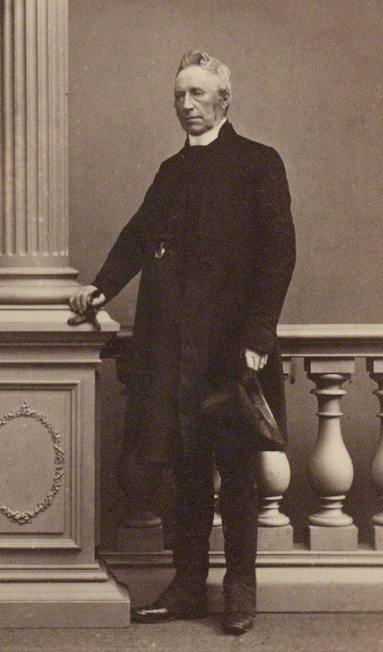
Lord Auckland in the 1860s

Robert John Eden, 3rd Baron Auckland (10 July 1799 – 25 April 1870), styled The Honourable Robert Eden from birth until 1849, was a British clergyman. He was Bishop of Sodor and Man from 1847 to 1854 and Bishop of Bath and Wells from 1854 to 1869.

== Background and education ==
Born at Eden Farm, Beckenham, Kent, he was third son of William Eden, 1st Baron Auckland and his wife Eleanor Elliot, oldest daughter of Sir Gilbert Elliot, 3rd Baronet. His older brother was George Eden, 1st Earl of Auckland, his uncles were Sir Robert Eden, 1st Baronet, of Maryland and Morton Eden, 1st Baron Henley. Eden was sent to Eton in 1814 and went then to Magdalene College, Cambridge, where he proceeded Master of Arts five years later. In 1847, he received a Bachelor of Divinity and a Doctor of Divinity by the University of Cambridge. When his brother George died in 1849, he succeeded him not in the earldom, but in the barony conferred upon their father.

== Career ==
Eden was made deacon in 1823 by the Bishop of Norwich, ordained priest in 1824 by the Bishop of Worcester and was appointed rector of Eyam in Derbyshire in 1823. He was transferred to Hertingfordbury, near Hertford in 1825, a post he held for a decade. Subsequently, Eden served as vicar of Battersea until 1847. He was likewise nominated chaplain to King William IV in 1831 and after the latter's death in 1837 to Queen Victoria for the next ten years. On 23 May 1847, Eden was consecrated Bishop of Sodor and Man, and installed at Castletown on 29 June. He was translated to the see of Bath and Wells on 2 June 1854, which he held until his resignation on 6 September 1869.

== Author ==
Eden was the author of A Churchman's Theological Dictionary (1845), A Reply to a Letter to the Bishop of Bath and Wells on the subject of the recent Restoration of the Parish Church of Kingsbury Episcopi, by George Parsons (1854), Charges of the Bishop of Bath and Wells (3 vols. 1855, 1858, and 1861), and The Journal and Correspondence of William, Lord Auckland, edited by the Bishop of Bath and Wells (1860). He was moderate in his views, but inclining to the high church school.

== Family ==
Lord Auckland married Mary Hurt, eldest daughter of Francis Edward Hurt of Alderwasley, Derbyshire, on 15 September 1825. She died on 25 November 1872. Auckland died at the Bishop's Palace, Wells on 25 April 1870, and was buried in the Palm churchyard, near Wells Cathedral, four days later.

Robert and Mary had five sons and five daughters:

- The Hon. Eleanor Eden (1826–1873) was novelist under the pen name Lena and editor of her aunt's, Emily Eden letters.
- William George Eden, 4th Baron Auckland (19 Jan 1829 – 17 Feb 1890) married first Lucy Walbanke-Childers (c. 1836 – 25 Apr 1870), daughter of John Walbanke-Childers, had issue. Married second Lady Mabel Emily Finch-Hatton (1849 – 7 Nov 1872), daughter of George Finch-Hatton, 11th Earl of Winchilsea, had no issue. Married third, a distant cousin, Edith Eden (1860 – 28 Mar 1931), daughter of Sir William Eden, 4th and 6th Baronet, had issue.
- The Hon. Henry Johnes Eden (18 Sep 1830 – 10 Feb 1853) died unmarried.
- The Hon. Sir Ashley Eden (13 Nov 1831 – 9 July 1887) married Eva Maria Money (12 Jun 1824 – 10 Jan 1877), daughter of Vice-Admiral Rowland Money.
- The Hon. Emily Dulcibella Eden (18321893) married Edmund Henry Dickinson (1821–1897).
- The Hon. Florence Selina Eden (1835–1909)
- The Hon. Emma Mary Eden (c. 1836 – 30 Mar 1895) married Reverend Edward Heneage Paget (23 Jul 1828 – 29 Sep 1884) son of Edward Paget, had issue.
- The Hon. Maria Harriet Eden (1836–1909)
- The Hon. Robert Henley Shawe Eden (25 Sep 1840 – 28 Dec 1916) married Jessie Ellen Hildyard (1842 – 23 Jan 1927), daughter of Reverend Frederick Hildyard.

== Arms ==
Coat of arms of Barons Auckland
Crest A dexter arm embowed in armour couped at the shoulder proper and grasping a garb or banded vert. Escutcheon Gules on a chevron argent between three garbs or banded Vert as many escallops sable. Supporters Dexter, a horse guardant argent, charged on the shoulder with a fleur-de-lis or; Sinister, a horse argent, charged on the shoulder with a tower or. Motto Si Sit Prudentia (If there be but prudence).

Church of England titles
Preceded by Walter Shirley	Bishop of Sodor and Man; 1847–1854	Succeeded by Horatio Powys
Preceded by Richard Bagot	Bishop of Bath and Wells; 1854–1869	Succeeded by Lord Arthur Hervey
Peerage of Ireland
Preceded by George Eden	Baron Auckland; 1849–1870	Succeeded by William George Eden
Peerage of Great Britain
Preceded by George Eden	Baron Auckland; 1849–1870	Succeeded by William George Eden
