= Eleanor Eden (novelist) =

- Born: September 26, 1826; Hertingfordbury Rectory Manor
- Died: April 2, 1879; Chapmanslade
- Occupation: Writer
- Parents: Robert Eden, 3rd Baron Auckland (father); Mary Hurt (mother)
- Relatives: Ashley Eden, Emma Eden, Henry Johnes Eden

Eleanor Eden (September 26, 1826 – April 2, 1879) was a British writer who published books for adults and children under her own name and the nickname Lena Eden. She is best known for the novel Dumbleton Common (1867).

Eleanor Eden was born on September 26, 1826 in Hertingfordbury Rectory Manor, the eldest child of Robert Eden, 3rd Baron Auckland. Most of her adult fiction was set in rural England. The most popular of these was Dumbleton Common (1867), inspired by Cranford by Elizabeth Gaskell. The work is narrated by "Little Miss Patty" and takes place in a village outside London. Her novel False and True focuses on the heroine Vamela Dynely. She also edited and published the letters of her aunt, novelist Emily Eden.

Eleanor Eden died on 2 April 1879 in Chapmanslade.

== Bibliography ==
- Easton and its Inhabitants: or, Sketches of Life in a Country Town. 1 vol. London: L. Booth, 1858.
- False and True. 1 vol. London: L. Booth, 1859.
- The Autobiography of a Working Man. 1 vol. London: Bentley, 1862.
- Little Jack's First Voyage. 1863.
- The Strolling Musicians. 1863.
- Good Thoughts Selected from Writings of Good Men. 1865.
- Dumbleton Common. 2 vol. London: Bentley, 1867.
- Emily Eden's Letters from India. 1872.
