= William Pitt the Younger =

British statesman (1759–1806)

The Right Honourable William Pitt
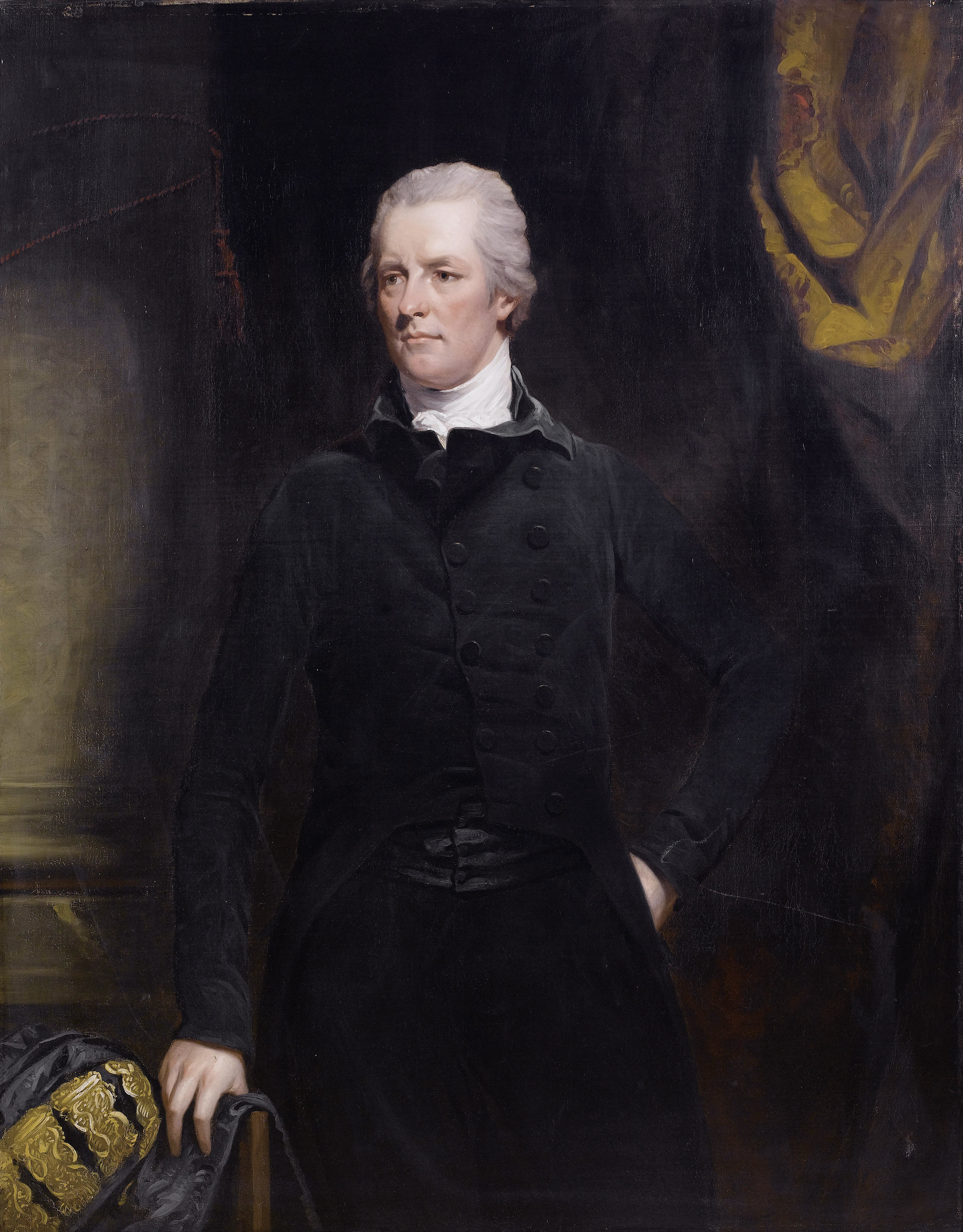
- Portrait by John Hoppner, c. 1806–10 (Note: Copy made after 1806. The original was made in 1804.)

Prime Minister of the United Kingdom
- In office 10 May 1804 – 23 January 1806
- Monarch: George III
- Preceded by: Henry Addington
- Succeeded by: The Lord Grenville
- In office 1 January 1801 – 14 March 1801
- Monarch: George III
- Preceded by: Office established
- Succeeded by: Henry Addington

Prime Minister of Great Britain
- In office 19 December 1783 – 1 January 1801
- Monarch: George III
- Preceded by: The Duke of Portland
- Succeeded by: Office abolished

Chancellor of the Exchequer
- In office 10 May 1804 – 23 January 1806
- Prime Minister: Himself
- Preceded by: Henry Addington
- Succeeded by: Lord Henry Petty
- In office 19 December 1783 – 14 March 1801
- Prime Minister: Himself
- Preceded by: Lord John Cavendish
- Succeeded by: Henry Addington
- In office 10 July 1782 – 31 March 1783
- Prime Minister: The Earl of Shelburne
- Preceded by: Lord John Cavendish
- Succeeded by: Lord John Cavendish
Parliamentary offices
Leader of the House of Commons
In office 10 May 1804 – 23 January 1806
Prime Minister	Himself
Preceded by	Henry Addington
Succeeded by	Charles James Fox
In office 19 December 1783 – 14 March 1801
Prime Minister	Himself
Preceded by	Lord North; Charles James Fox
Succeeded by	Henry Addington
Member of Parliament for Cambridge University
In office 18 May 1784 – 23 January 1806
Preceded by	Lord John Townshend
Succeeded by	Lord Henry Petty
Member of Parliament for Appleby
In office 8 January 1781 – 30 March 1784
Preceded by	William Lowther
Succeeded by	John Leveson-Gower

Personal details
- Born: 28 May 1759 Hayes, Kent, England
- Died: 23 January 1806 (aged 46) Putney, Surrey, England
- Resting place: Westminster Abbey, England
- Party: Tory
- Parent(s): William Pitt, 1st Earl of Chatham; Lady Hester Grenville
- Relatives: Pitt family
- Education: Pembroke College, Cambridge

Military service
- Allegiance: Great Britain
- Branch/service: British Militia
- Years of service: 1802–1804
- Rank: Colonel
- Unit: Trinity House Volunteer Artillery; Cinque Ports Volunteers
- Battles/wars: Napoleonic Wars

William Pitt (28 May 1759 – 23 January 1806) was a British statesman who served as the last prime minister of Great Britain from 1783 until the Acts of Union 1800, and the first official prime minister of the United Kingdom from January 1801. He left office in March 1801, but served as prime minister again from 1804 until his death in 1806. He was also Chancellor of the Exchequer for all his time as prime minister. He is known as "Pitt the Younger" to distinguish him from his father, William Pitt the Elder, who had also previously served as prime minister from 1766–1768.

Pitt's premierships, which came during the reign of King George III, were dominated by major political events in Europe, including the French Revolution and the Napoleonic Wars. Pitt, although often referred to by historians as a Tory, or "new Tory", called himself an "independent Whig" and was generally opposed to the development of a strict partisan political system.

Pitt was regarded as an outstanding administrator who worked for efficiency and reform, bringing in a new generation of competent administrators. He increased taxes to pay for the great war against France and cracked down on radicalism. To counter the threat of Irish support for France, he engineered the Acts of Union 1800 and tried (but failed) to secure Catholic emancipation as part of the Union. He created the "new Toryism", which revived the Tory Party and enabled it to stay in power for the next quarter of a century.

The historian Asa Briggs argues that his personality did not endear itself to the British mind, for Pitt was too solitary and too colourless, and too often exuded an attitude of superiority. His greatness came in the war with France. Pitt reacted to become what Lord Minto called "the Atlas of our reeling globe". William Wilberforce said, "For personal purity, disinterestedness and love of this country, I have never known his equal." The historian Charles Petrie concludes that he was one of the greatest prime ministers "if on no other ground than that he enabled the country to pass from the old order to the new without any violent upheaval. ... He understood the new Britain." For this he is ranked highly amongst all British prime ministers in multiple surveys.

Pitt served as prime minister for eighteen years, 343 days, making him the second-longest-serving British prime minister, behind only Robert Walpole. Having entered office at the age of 24, Pitt is the youngest prime minister in both British and world history.

== Early life ==
=== Family ===
William Pitt, the second son of William Pitt, 1st Earl of Chatham, was born on 28 May 1759 at Hayes Place in the village of Hayes in Kent. He was from a political family on both sides, as his mother, Hester Grenville, was the sister of the former prime minister George Grenville. According to the biographer John Ehrman, Pitt exhibited the brilliance and dynamism of his father's line, and the determined, methodical nature of the Grenvilles.

=== Education ===
Suffering from occasional poor health as a boy, he was educated at home by the Reverend Edward Wilson. An intelligent child, Pitt quickly became proficient in Latin and Greek. He was admitted to Pembroke College, Cambridge, on 26 April 1773, a month before turning fourteen, going up to Cambridge in October 1773. He studied political philosophy, classics, mathematics, trigonometry, chemistry and history. At Cambridge, Pitt was tutored by George Pretyman Tomline, also at Pembroke College, who became a close personal friend and looked after Pitt whilst at University. Pitt later appointed Pretyman Bishop of Lincoln, then Winchester, and drew upon his advice throughout his political career. While at Cambridge, he befriended the young William Wilberforce, who became a lifelong friend and political ally in Parliament. Pitt tended to socialise only with fellow students and others already known to him, rarely venturing outside the university grounds. Yet he was described as charming and friendly. According to Wilberforce, Pitt had an exceptional wit along with an endearingly gentle sense of humour: "no man ... ever indulged more freely or happily in that playful facetiousness which gratifies all without wounding any." An example of Pitt's innocent wit was recorded by Sir John Sinclair. In the early years of Pitt's ministry there was great interest in the new young First minister. Sinclair was required to write an account of Pitt to satisfy foreign curiosity when he was abroad. At the end of a long description of Britain's eminent leader he added: "'Of all the places where you have been, where did you fare best?' My answer was, 'In Poland; for the nobility live there with uncommon taste and splendour; their cooks are French,- their confectioners Italian, – and their wine Tokey.' He immediately observed, 'I have heard before of The Polish diet.'"

In 1776 Pitt, plagued by poor health, took advantage of a little-used privilege available only to the sons of noblemen, and chose to graduate without having to pass examinations. Pitt's father was said to have insisted that his son spontaneously translate passages of classical literature orally into English, and declaim impromptu upon unfamiliar topics in an effort to develop his oratorical skills. Pitt's father, who had by then been raised to the peerage as Earl of Chatham, died in 1778. As the younger son, Pitt received only a small inheritance. In the months following the death of the Earl of Chatham, Pitt was forced to defend his father's reputation. This came about when the Bute family made claims that the late Lord had sought out the Earl of Bute with the desire to form a political coalition. Pitt although just over nineteen years of age publicly argued that this was not the case. Faced with Pitt's arguments the Bute family backed off and ceased making their claims. He acquired his legal education at Lincoln's Inn and was called to the bar in the summer of 1780.

== Early political career (1780–1783) ==
=== Member of Parliament ===
During the general elections of September 1780, at the age of 21, Pitt contested the University of Cambridge seat, but lost, coming bottom of the poll of the five candidates. Pitt had campaigned on his own merit, not as part of any group or with prominent backers. He explained to a friend that 'I do not wish to be thought inlisted [sic] in any party or to call myself anything but the Independent Whig, which in words is hardly a distinction, as every one alike pretends to it.' Intent on entering Parliament, Pitt secured the patronage of James Lowther, later 1st Earl Lowther, with the help of his university friend Charles Manners, 4th Duke of Rutland. Lowther effectively controlled the pocket borough of Appleby; a by-election in that constituency sent Pitt to the House of Commons in January 1781. Pitt's entry into Parliament is somewhat ironic as he later railed against the very same rotten and pocket boroughs that had given him his seat.

In Parliament, the youthful Pitt cast aside his tendency to be withdrawn in public, emerging as a noted debater right from his maiden speech. Pitt's first speech made a dramatic impression. Sir John Sinclair, member of Parliament for Lostwithiel, thought that Pitt's first speech was never surpassed and "rarely equalled by any ever delivered in that assembly." When Pitt resumed his seat after finishing speaking there was thunderous applause. Sinclair noted that there was "utter astonishment ... by an audience accustomed to the most splendid efforts of eloquence." Pitt originally aligned himself with prominent Whigs such as Charles James Fox. With the Whigs, Pitt denounced the continuation of the American War of Independence, as his father strongly had. Instead he proposed that the prime minister, Lord North, should make peace with the rebellious American colonies. Pitt also supported parliamentary reform measures, including a proposal that would have checked electoral corruption. He renewed his friendship with Wilberforce, now the MP for Hull, with whom he frequently met in the gallery of the Commons.

=== Chancellorship ===
After Lord North's ministry collapsed in 1782, the Whig Charles Watson-Wentworth, 2nd Marquess of Rockingham, was appointed prime minister. Pitt was offered the minor post of Vice-Treasurer of Ireland, but he refused, considering the post overly subordinate. Lord Rockingham died only three months after coming to power; he was succeeded by another Whig, William Petty, 2nd Earl of Shelburne. Many Whigs who had formed a part of the Rockingham ministry, including Fox, now refused to serve under Lord Shelburne, the new prime minister. Pitt, however, was comfortable with Shelburne, and thus joined his government; he was appointed Chancellor of the Exchequer.

Fox, who became Pitt's lifelong political rival, then joined a coalition with Lord North, with whom he collaborated to bring about the defeat of the Shelburne administration. When Lord Shelburne resigned in 1783, King George III, who despised Fox, offered to appoint Pitt prime minister, but Pitt declined, for he knew he would be incapable of securing the support of the Commons. The Fox–North coalition rose to power in a government nominally headed by William Cavendish-Bentinck, 3rd Duke of Portland.

Pitt, who had been stripped of his post as Chancellor of the Exchequer, joined the Opposition. He raised the issue of parliamentary reform in order to strain the uneasy Fox–North coalition, which included both supporters and detractors of reform. He did not advocate an expansion of the electoral franchise, but he did seek to address bribery and rotten boroughs. Though his proposal failed, many reformers in Parliament came to regard him as their leader, instead of Charles James Fox.

=== Effects of the American War of Independence ===
Losing the war and the Thirteen Colonies was a shock to the British system. The war revealed the limitations of Britain's fiscal-military state when it had powerful enemies and no allies, depended on extended and vulnerable transatlantic lines of communication, and was faced for the first time since the 17th century by both Protestant and Catholic foes. The defeat heightened dissension and escalated political antagonism to the king's ministers. Inside parliament, the primary concern changed from fears of an over-mighty monarch to the issues of representation, parliamentary reform, and government retrenchment. Reformers sought to destroy what they saw as widespread institutional corruption. The result was a crisis from 1776 to 1783. The peace in 1783 left France financially prostrate, while the British economy boomed due to the return of American business. That crisis ended in 1784 as a result of the king's shrewdness in outwitting Fox and renewed confidence in the system engendered by the leadership of Pitt. Historians conclude that the loss of the American colonies enabled Britain to deal with the French Revolution with more unity and organisation than would otherwise have been the case. Britain turned towards Asia, the Pacific, and later Africa with subsequent exploration leading to the rise of the Second British Empire.

== First Premiership (1783–1801) ==
=== Rise to power ===
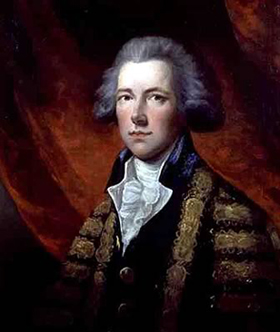
- First premiership of Pitt the Younger; 19 December 1783 – 14 March 1801
- Monarch: George III
- Cabinet: First Pitt ministry
- Party: Tory
- Seat: 10 Downing Street
- Coat of arms of HM Government

The Fox–North Coalition fell in December 1783, after Fox had introduced Edmund Burke's bill to reform the East India Company to gain the patronage he so greatly lacked while the King refused to support him. Fox stated the bill was necessary to save the company from bankruptcy. Pitt responded that: "Necessity is the plea for every infringement of human freedom. It is the argument of tyrants; it is the creed of slaves." The king was opposed to the bill; when it passed in the House of Commons, he secured its defeat in the House of Lords by threatening to regard anyone who voted for it as his enemy. Following the bill's failure in the Upper House, George III dismissed the coalition government and finally entrusted the premiership to William Pitt, after having offered the position to him three times previously.

==== Appointment ====
A constitutional crisis arose when the king dismissed the Fox–North coalition government and named Pitt to replace it. Though faced with a hostile majority in Parliament, Pitt was able to solidify his position within a few months. Some historians argue that his success was inevitable given the decisive importance of monarchical power; others argue that the king gambled on Pitt and that both would have failed but for a run of good fortune.

Pitt, at the age of 24, became Great Britain's youngest prime minister ever. The contemporary satire The Rolliad ridiculed him for his youth:

Above the rest, majestically great,
Behold the infant Atlas of the state,
The matchless miracle of modern days,
In whom Britannia to the world displays
A sight to make surrounding nations stare;
A kingdom trusted to a school-boy's care.

Many saw Pitt as a stop-gap appointment until some more senior statesman took on the role. However, although it was widely predicted that the new "mince-pie administration" would not outlast the Christmas season, it survived for seventeen years.

So as to reduce the power of the Opposition, Pitt offered Charles James Fox and his allies posts in the Cabinet; Pitt's refusal to include Lord North, however, thwarted his efforts. The new government was immediately on the defensive and in January 1784 was defeated on a motion of no confidence. Pitt, however, took the unprecedented step of refusing to resign, despite this defeat. He retained the support of the king, who would not entrust the reins of power to the Fox–North Coalition. He also received the support of the House of Lords, which passed supportive motions, and many messages of support from the country at large, in the form of petitions approving of his appointment which influenced some MPs to switch their support to Pitt. At the same time, he was granted the Freedom of the City of London. When he returned from the ceremony to mark this, men of the City pulled Pitt's coach home themselves, as a sign of respect. When passing a Whig club, the coach came under attack from a group of men who tried to assault Pitt. When news of this spread, it was assumed Fox and his associates had tried to bring down Pitt by any means.

==== Electoral victory ====
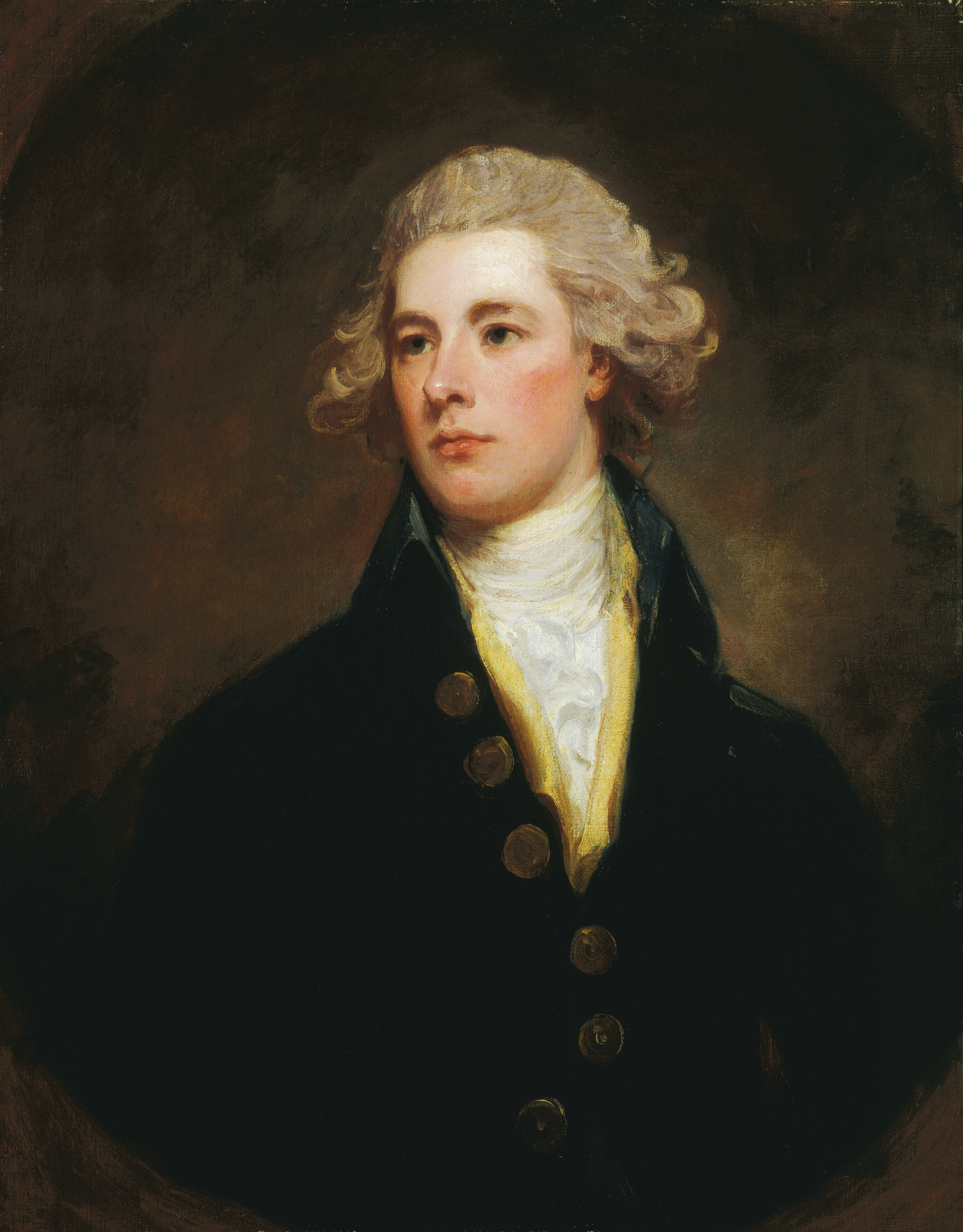
William Pitt in 1783, by George Romney

Pitt gained great popularity with the public at large as "Honest Billy" who was seen as a refreshing change from the dishonesty, corruption and lack of principles widely associated with both Fox and North. Despite a series of defeats in the House of Commons, Pitt defiantly remained in office, watching the Coalition's majority shrink as some Members of Parliament left the Opposition to abstain.

In March 1784 Parliament was dissolved, and a general election ensued. An electoral defeat for the government was out of the question because Pitt enjoyed the support of George III. Patronage and bribes paid by HM Treasury were normally expected to be enough to secure the government a comfortable majority in the House of Commons, but on this occasion, the government reaped much popular support as well. In most popular constituencies, the election was fought between candidates clearly representing either Pitt or Fox and North. Early returns showed a massive swing to Pitt with the result that many Opposition Members who still had not faced election either defected, stood down, or made deals with their opponents to avoid expensive defeats.

A notable exception came in Fox's own constituency of Westminster, which contained one of the largest electorates in the country. In a contest estimated to have cost a quarter of the total spending in the entire country, Fox bitterly fought against two Pittite candidates to secure one of the two seats for the constituency. Great legal wranglings ensued, including the examination of every single vote cast, which dragged on for more than a year. Meanwhile, Fox sat for the Scottish pocket borough of Tain Burghs. Many saw the dragging out of the result as being unduly vindictive on the part of Pitt and eventually the examinations were abandoned with Fox declared elected. Elsewhere, Pitt won a personal triumph when he was elected a member for Cambridge University, a constituency he had long coveted and which he would continue to represent for the remainder of his life. Pitt's new constituency suited him perfectly as he was able to act independently. Sir James Lowther's pocket borough of Appleby, which had been Pitt's previous constituency, had strings attached. Now Pitt could really be the 'independent Whig' he identified as.

=== First government ===
In domestic politics, Pitt concerned himself with the cause of parliamentary reform. In 1785 he introduced a bill to remove the representation of thirty-six rotten and pocket boroughs, and to extend, in a small way, the electoral franchise to more individuals. Pitt's support for the bill, however, was not strong enough to prevent its defeat in the Commons. The bill of 1785 was the last parliamentary reform proposal introduced by Pitt to British legislators.

==== Colonial reform ====
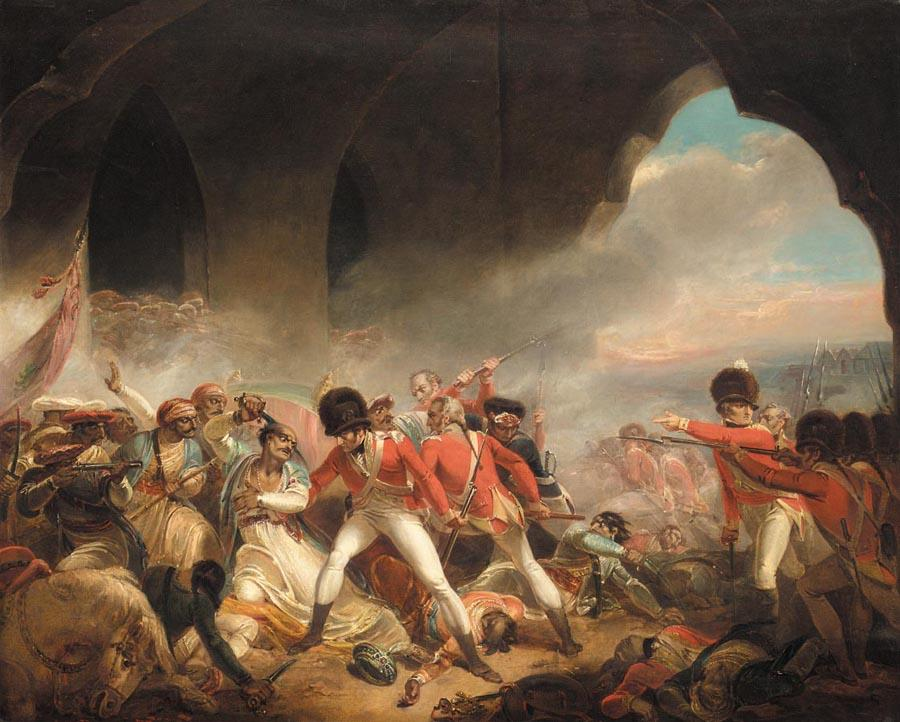
The Last Effort and Fall of Tippoo Sultaun by Henry Singleton. The defeat of Tipu Sultan and the Sultanate of Mysore in 1799

His administration secure, Pitt could begin to enact his agenda. His first major piece of legislation as prime minister was the India Act 1784, which re-organised the British East India Company and kept a watch over corruption. The India Act created a new Board of Control to oversee the affairs of the East India Company. It differed from Fox's failed India Bill 1783 and specified that the board would be appointed by the King. Pitt was appointed, along with Lord Sydney, who was appointed president. The act centralised British rule in India by reducing the power of the governors of Bombay and Madras and by increasing that of Governor-General Charles Cornwallis. Further augmentations and clarifications of the governor-general's authority were made in 1786, presumably by Lord Sydney, and presumably as a result of the company's setting up of Penang with their own superintendent (governor), Captain Francis Light, in 1786.

Convicts were originally transported to the Thirteen Colonies in North America, but after the American War of Independence ended in 1783, the newly formed United States refused to accept further convicts. Pitt's government took the decision to settle what is now Australia and found the penal colony in August 1786. The First Fleet of 11 vessels carried over a thousand settlers, including 778 convicts. The Colony of New South Wales was formally proclaimed by Governor Arthur Phillip on 7 February 1788 at Sydney.

==== Finances ====
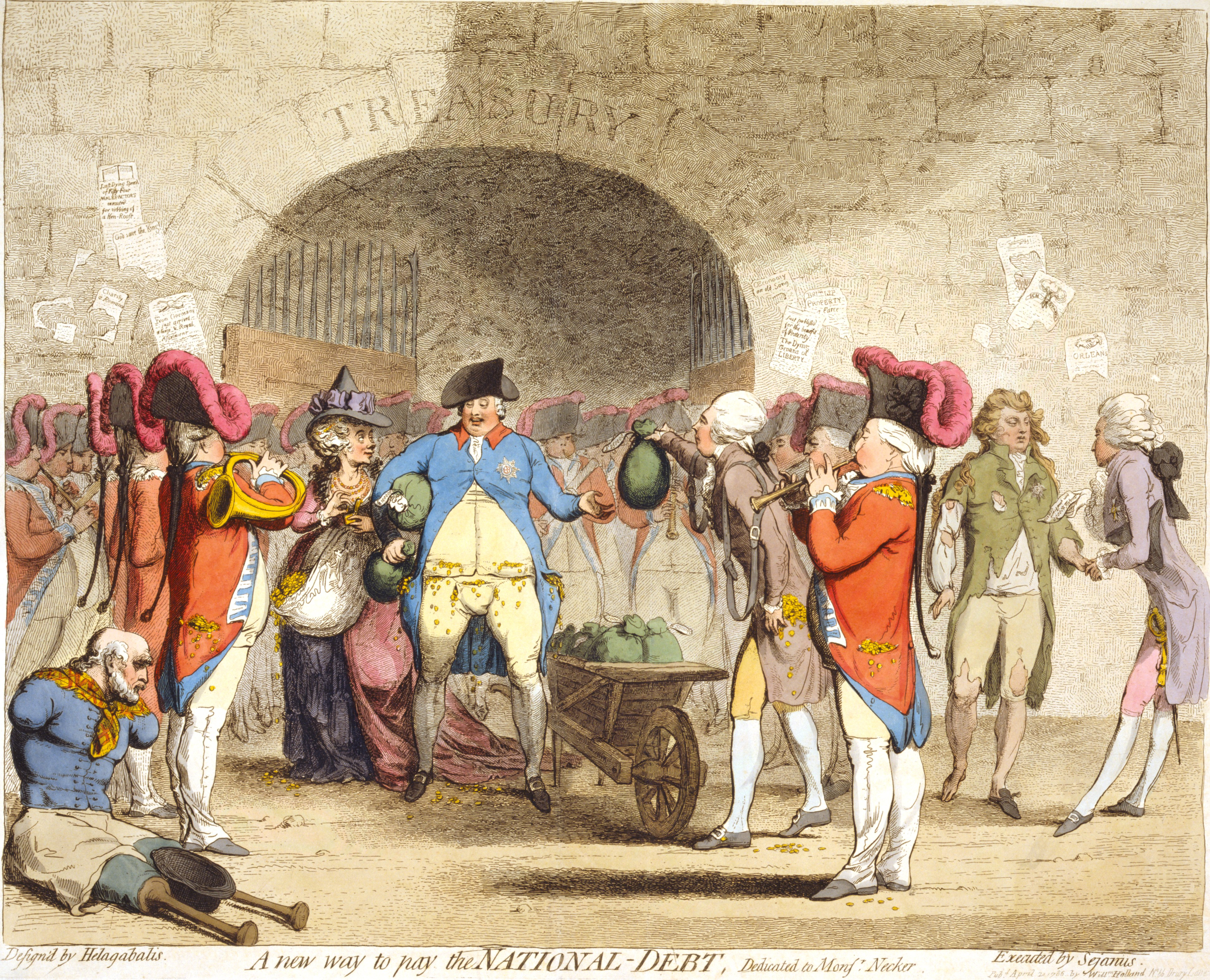
In "A new way to pay the National Debt" (1786), James Gillray caricatured Queen Charlotte and George III awash with treasury funds to cover royal debts, with Pitt handing them another moneybag.

Another important domestic issue with which Pitt had to concern himself was the national debt, which had doubled to £243 million during the American war. (Note: about £45 billion today) Every year, a third of the budget of £24 million went to pay interest. Pitt sought to reduce the national debt by imposing new taxes. In 1786, he instituted a sinking fund so that £1 million a year was added to a fund so that it could accumulate interest; eventually, the money in the fund was to be used to pay off the national debt. Pitt had learned of the idea of the 'Sinking Fund' from his father in 1772. Earl Chatham had been informed of the Welshman, Sir Richard Price's idea, Pitt approved of the idea and adopted it when he was in office. By 1792, the debt had fallen to £170 million. (Note: about £24 billion today)

Pitt always paid careful attention to financial issues. A fifth of Britain's imports were smuggled in without paying taxes. He made it easier for honest merchants to import goods by lowering tariffs on easily smuggled items such as tea, wine, spirits, and tobacco. This policy raised customs revenues by nearly £2 million a year. (Note: about £261 million today)

In 1797 Pitt was forced to protect the kingdom's gold reserves by preventing individuals from exchanging banknotes for gold. Great Britain would continue to use paper money for over two decades. Pitt also introduced Great Britain's first-ever income tax. The new tax helped offset losses in indirect tax revenue, which had been caused by a decline in trade. Pitt's two policies of suspending cash payments and introducing Income Tax were later cited by the French Minister of Finance as being 'genius', as they had stopped the French from destroying Britain's economy.

==== Foreign affairs ====
Pitt sought European alliances to restrict French influence, forming the Triple Alliance with Prussia and the Dutch Republic in 1788. During the Nootka Sound Controversy in 1790, Pitt took advantage of the alliance to force Spain to give up its claim to exclusive control over the western coast of North and South America. The Alliance, however, failed to produce any other important benefits for Great Britain.

Pitt was alarmed at Russian expansion in the 1780s at the expense of the Ottoman Empire. The relations between Russia and Britain were disturbed during the Russo-Turkish War of 1787–1792 by Pitt's subscription to the view of the Prussian government that the Triple Alliance could not with impunity allow the balance of power in Eastern Europe to be disturbed. In peace talks with the Ottomans, Russia refused to return the key Ochakov fortress. Pitt wanted to threaten military retaliation. However Russia's ambassador Semyon Vorontsov organised Pitt's enemies and launched a public opinion campaign. Pitt had become alarmed at the opposition to his Russian policy in Parliament, Edmund Burke and Fox both uttering powerful speeches against the restoration of Ochakov to the Turks. Pitt won the vote so narrowly that he gave up. The outbreak of the French Revolution and its attendant wars temporarily united Britain and Russia in an ideological alliance against French republicanism.

==== The King's condition ====
In 1788 Pitt faced a major crisis when George III fell victim to a mysterious illness, (Note: The consensus view among historians is that the king was suffering from the blood disorder porphyria, which was unknown at this time. If protracted and untreated, it has serious mentally debilitating effects.) a form of mental disorder that incapacitated him. If the sovereign was incapable of fulfilling his constitutional duties, Parliament would need to appoint a regent to rule in his place. All factions agreed that the only viable candidate was the king's eldest son and heir apparent, George, Prince of Wales. The Prince, however, was a supporter of Fox. Had the Prince come to power, he would almost surely have dismissed Pitt. He did not have such an opportunity, however, as Parliament spent months debating legal technicalities relating to the regency. Fortunately for Pitt, the King recovered in February 1789, just after a Regency Bill had been introduced and passed in the Commons.

The general elections of 1790 resulted in a majority for the government, and Pitt continued as prime minister. In 1791, he proceeded to address one of the problems facing the growing British Empire: the future of British Canada. By the Constitutional Act of 1791, the province of Quebec was divided into two separate provinces: the predominantly French Lower Canada and the predominantly English Upper Canada. In August 1792, coincident with the capture of Louis XVI by the French revolutionaries, George III appointed Pitt as Lord Warden of the Cinque Ports, a position whose incumbent was responsible for the coastal defences of the realm. The King had in 1791 offered him a Knighthood of the Garter, but he suggested the honour should go to his elder brother, the second Earl of Chatham.

==== French Revolution ====
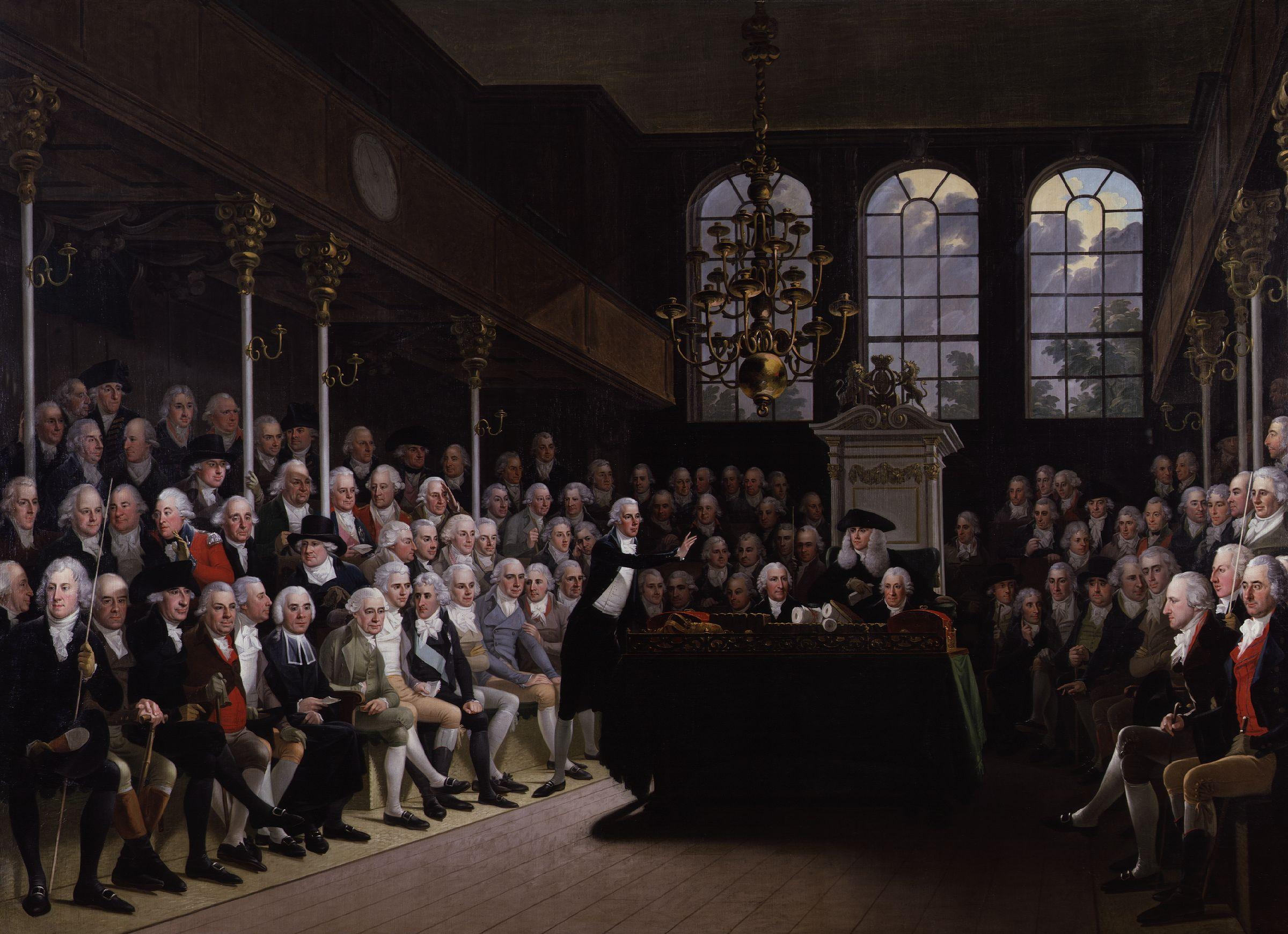
Pitt (standing centre) addressing the Commons on the outbreak of the war with France (1793); The House of Commons, 1793–94 by Anton Hickel

An early favourable response to the French Revolution encouraged many in Great Britain to reopen the issue of parliamentary reform, which had been dormant since Pitt's reform bill was defeated in 1785. The reformers, however, were quickly labelled as radicals and associates of the French revolutionaries. Pitt, due to economic reasons, wanted to remain aloof from War with France. However, this option was taken away from him by an ultimatum from George III. Pitt could either resign or go to war. Committed to making Britain financially stable Pitt agreed, albeit very reluctantly, to go to war against the French Revolutionaries. Though France's declaration of hostilities against Britain meant that Britain was forced into war. Subsequently, in 1794, Pitt's administration tried three of them for treason but lost. Parliament began to enact repressive legislation in order to silence the reformers. Individuals who published seditious material were punished, and, in 1794, the writ of habeas corpus was suspended. Other repressive measures included the Seditious Meetings Act 1795, which restricted the right of individuals to assemble publicly, and the Combination Acts, which restricted the formation of societies or organisations that favoured political reforms. Problems manning the Royal Navy also led to Pitt to introduce the Quota System in 1795 in addition to the existing system of impressment.

The war with France was extremely expensive, straining Great Britain's finances. Unlike in the latter stages of the Napoleonic Wars, at this point Britain had only a very small standing army, and thus contributed to the war effort mainly through sea power and by supplying funds to other coalition members facing France.

==== Ideological struggle ====
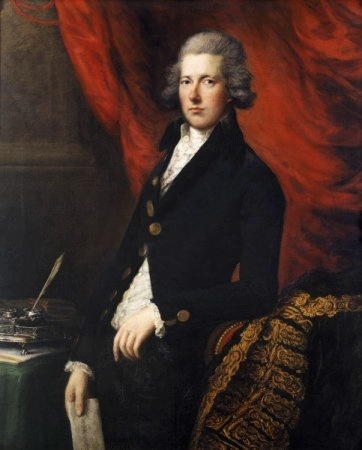
William Pitt by Gainsborough Dupont in the Burrell Collection, Glasgow

Throughout the 1790s, the war against France was presented as an ideological struggle between French republicanism and British monarchism with the British government seeking to mobilise public opinion in support of the war. The Pitt government waged a vigorous propaganda campaign contrasting the ordered society of Britain dominated by the aristocracy and the gentry vs. the "anarchy" of the French Revolution and always sought to associate British "radicals" with the revolution in France. Some of the writers the British government subsidized (often from Secret Service funds) included Edmund Burke, William Cobbett, William Playfair, John Reeves, and Samuel Johnson (the last through the pension granted him in 1762).

Though the Pitt government did drastically reduce civil liberties and created a nationwide spy network with ordinary people being encouraged to denounce any "radicals" that might be in their midst, the historian Eric J. Evans argued the picture of Pitt's "reign of terror" as portrayed by the Marxist historian E. P. Thompson is incorrect, stating there is much evidence of a "popular conservative movement" that rallied in defence of King and country. Evans wrote that there were about 200 prosecutions of "radicals" suspected of sympathy with the French revolution in British courts in the 1790s, which was much less than the prosecutions of suspected Jacobites after the rebellions of 1715 and 1745.

However, the spy network maintained by the government was efficient. In Jane Austen's novel Northanger Abbey, which was written in the 1790s, but not published until 1817, one of the characters remarks that it is not possible for a family to keep secrets in these modern times when spies for the government were lurking everywhere. This comment captures well the tense, paranoid atmosphere of the 1790s, when people were being encouraged to report "radicals" to the authorities.

==== Saint-Domingue ====
In 1793, Pitt approved plans to capture the French colony of Saint-Domingue, which had been in a state of unrest since a 1791 slave rebellion. Its capture would provide a bargaining chip for future negotiations with France and prevent similar unrest in the British West Indies. Planters in the British West Indies were greatly disturbed by events in Saint-Domingue, and many pressured the Pitt ministry to invade the colony. On 20 September 1793, a British invasion force sent from Jamaica landed in Jérémie, where they were greeted with cheers by the city's white population. Two days later, another British force under Commodore John Ford took Môle-Saint-Nicolas without a fight. However, British attempts to expand into the rest of the colony were frustrated by a lack of troops and yellow fever. As commissioners sent by the French Republic to Saint-Domingue had abolished slavery, an institution legal in areas of the colony under British occupation, most of Saint-Domingue's Black inhabitants rallied to the Republican cause. An undeterred Pitt launched what he called the "great push" in 1795, sending out an even larger expedition.

In November 1795 some 218 ships left Portsmouth for Saint-Domingue. After the failure of the Quiberon expedition earlier in 1795, when the British landed a force of French royalists on the coast of France who were annihilated by the French Revolutionary Army, Pitt had decided it was crucial for Britain to take Saint-Domingue, no matter what the cost in lives and money, to improve Britain's negotiating hand when it came time to make peace with the French Republic. The historian Michael Duffy argued that since Pitt committed far more manpower and money to the Caribbean expeditions, especially the one to Saint-Domingue, than he ever did to Europe in the years 1793–1798, it is proper to view the West Indies as Britain's main theatre of war and Europe as more of a sideshow. By 1795 half the British Army was in the West Indies (with the largest contingent in Saint-Domingue), with the rest being divided among Europe, India and North America.

As the British death toll, largely caused by yellow fever, continued to climb, Pitt was criticised in the House of Commons. Several MPs suggested it might be better to abandon the expedition, but Pitt insisted that Britain had given its word of honour that it would protect allied French colonists in Saint-Domingue. In 1797 Colonel Thomas Maitland arrived in Saint-Domingue and quickly realised the British position there was untenable. He negotiated a withdrawal with Governor-General Toussaint Louverture and the last British troops left the colony on 31 August 1798. The invasion had cost HM Treasury 4 million pounds (roughly £500 million in 2024) and resulted in the deaths of roughly 50,000 soldiers and sailors in British service, mostly through disease, with another 50,000 no longer fit for service. The military historian Sir John Fortescue wrote that Pitt and his cabinet had tried to destroy French power "in these pestilent islands ... only to discover, when it was too late, that they practically destroyed the British army". Fortescue wrote that the British troops who served in Saint-Domingue were "victims of imbecility".

==== Ireland ====
Pitt maintained close control over Ireland. The Lord Lieutenants were to follow his policy of Protestant control and very little reform for the Catholic majority. When the opposition Portland group joined Pitt's ministry, splitting the Foxite opposition, Pitt was put in a difficult situation. He wanted to replace his friend Westmorland, who was Lord Lieutenant, with Lord Camden, whom he could trust. However, one of Portland's group, Earl Fitzwilliam, wanted the position. Pitt, to keep Portland on side, appointed Fitzwilliam but allowed the new Lord Lieutenant to believe that he had free range to reform the government in Ireland. Thus, when Fitzwilliam's reforms became public in London he was quickly recalled and Camden replaced him. This ensured Pitt had his man in Dublin Castle, whilst also retaining Portland and his group. The unfortunate effect was to produce optimism amongst Irish Catholics who wanted political reform. In May 1798, the long-simmering unrest in Ireland exploded into outright rebellion with the United Irishmen Society launching a revolt to win independence for Ireland. Pitt took an extremely repressive approach to the United Irishmen with the Crown executing about 1,500 United Irishmen after the revolt. The revolt of 1798 destroyed Pitt's faith in the governing competence of the Dublin parliament (dominated by Protestant Ascendancy families). Thinking a less sectarian and more conciliatory approach would have avoided the uprising, Pitt sought an Act of Union that would make Ireland an official part of the United Kingdom and end the "Irish Question". The French expeditions to Ireland in 1796 and 1798 (to support the United Irishmen) were regarded by Pitt as near-misses that might have provided an Irish base for French attacks on Britain, thus making the "Irish Question" a national security matter. As the Dublin parliament did not wish to disband, Pitt made generous use of what would now be called "pork barrel politics" to bribe Irish MPs to vote for the Act of Union.

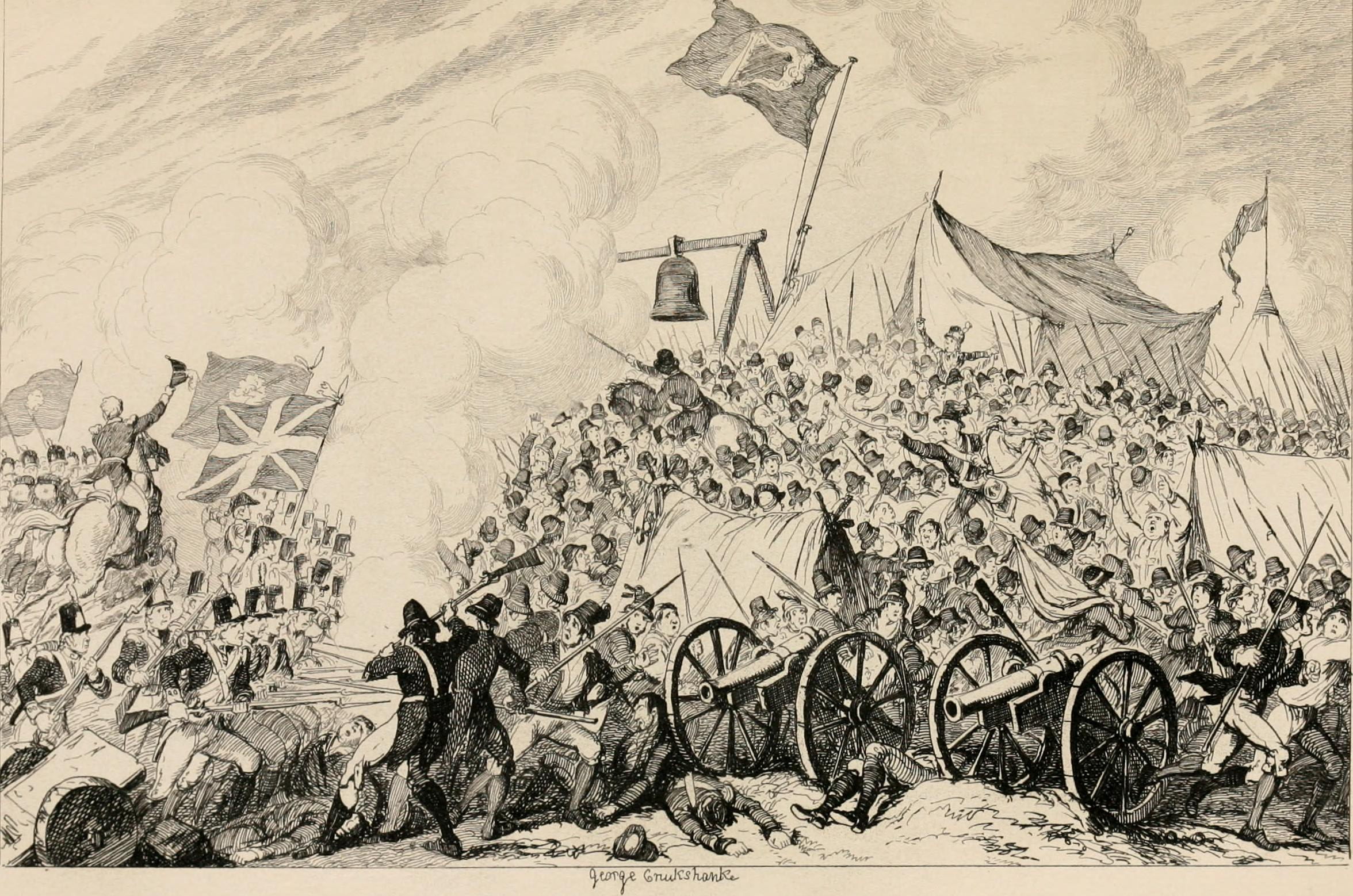
Irish Rebellion of 1798

Throughout the 1790s, the popularity of the Society of United Irishmen grew. Influenced by the American and French revolutions, this movement demanded independence and republicanism for Ireland. The United Irishmen Society was very anti-clerical, being equally opposed to the "superstitions" promoted by both the Church of England and the Roman Catholic church, which caused the latter to support the Crown. Realising that the Catholic church was an ally in the struggle against the French Revolution, Pitt had tried fruitlessly to persuade the Dublin parliament to loosen the anti-Catholic laws to "keep things quiet in Ireland". Pitt's efforts to soften the anti-Catholic laws failed in the face of determined resistance from the families of the Protestant Ascendancy in Ireland, who forced Pitt to recall the Earl Fitzwilliam as Lord Lieutenant of Ireland in 1795, when the latter had indicated he would support a bill for Catholic relief. In fact, the actions of Fitzwilliam had been encouraged by Pitt who wanted an excuse to remove Fitzwilliam and replace him with the Earl of Camden, however, Pitt had managed this feat without witnesses. Pitt was very much opposed to Catholic relief and the repeal of their political disabilities which were contained in the Test and Corporation Laws. In much of rural Ireland, law and order had broken down as an economic crisis further impoverished the already poor Irish peasantry, and a sectarian war with many atrocities on both sides had begun in 1793 between Catholic "Defenders" and Protestant "Peep o' Day Boys". A section of the Peep o'Day Boys who had renamed themselves the Loyal Orange Order in September 1795 were fanatically committed to upholding Protestant supremacy in Ireland at "almost any cost". In December 1796, a French invasion of Ireland led by General Lazare Hoche (scheduled to coordinate with a rising of the United Irishmen) was only thwarted by bad weather. To crush the United Irishmen, Pitt sent General Gerard Lake to Ulster in 1797 to call out Protestant Irish militiamen and organised an intelligence network of spies and informers.

==== Spithead mutiny ====
In April 1797 the mutiny of the entire Spithead fleet shook the government (sailors demanded a pay increase to match inflation). This mutiny occurred at the same moment that the Franco-Dutch alliance were preparing an invasion of Britain. To regain control of the fleet, Pitt agreed to navy pay increases and had George III pardon the mutineers. By contrast, the more political "floating republic" naval mutiny at the Nore in June 1797 led by Richard Parker was handled more repressively. Pitt refused to negotiate with Parker, whom he wanted to see hanged as a mutineer. In response to the 1797 mutinies, Pitt passed the Incitement to Mutiny Act 1797 making it unlawful to advocate breaking oaths to the Crown. In 1798, he passed the Defence of the Realm act, which further restricted civil liberties. Despite the major concerns to Britain's defences when the navy mutinied Pitt remained calm and in control. He was confident that the matter would be resolved. Lord Spencer, the First Lord of the Admiralty recalled how calm Pitt was. Very late one evening after visiting the Minister with desperate news of the fleet, as Spencer proceeded away from Downing Street, he remembered he had some more information to give to Pitt. He immediately returned to Number 10 only to be informed that Pitt was fast asleep. Henry Dundas, who was President of the Board of Control, Treasurer of the Navy, Secretary at War and a close friend of Pitt, envied the First Minister for his ability to sleep well in all circumstances.

==== Failure ====
Despite Pitt's efforts, the French continued to defeat the First Coalition, which collapsed in 1798. A Second Coalition, consisting of Great Britain, Austria, Russia, and the Ottoman Empire, was formed, but it, too, failed to overcome the French. The fall of the Second Coalition with the defeat of the Austrians at the Battle of Marengo (14 June 1800) and at the Battle of Hohenlinden (3 December 1800) left Great Britain facing France alone.

=== Duel ===
In May 1798, Pitt fought a duel against George Tierney. Their dispute began when Pitt proposed a measure to increase the manpower of the Royal Navy. Tierney called for more time to consider the bill, which frustrated Pitt, who then accused Tierney of obstructing national defence. When Tierney protested against the remark, instead of ordering Pitt to withdraw his comment or apologise, Speaker Addington asked Pitt to explain his remarks. An angry Pitt stood his ground 'he would neither retract from, nor farther explain, his former expressions.' The next day, Pitt received a challenge to a duel from Major-General George Walpole, acting as Tierney's second. Pitt accepted immediately and asked the Speaker of the House of Commons, Henry Addington, to be his second, but Addington refused. He then sought Thomas Steele, but when Steele could not be contacted, Dudley Ryder agreed to act as his second.

The two met by arrangement at Putney Heath on 27 May 1798. Armed with dueling pistols, both men took aim at twelve paces and missed. When it came time to take a second shot, Pitt deliberately aimed into the air. The seconds then jointly intervened and insisted the duel end, having decided that sufficient satisfaction had been given and that both parties had retained their honor.

=== Resignation ===
The usual explanation for Pitt's resignation is explained by Hague. Following the Acts of Union 1800, Pitt sought to inaugurate the new United Kingdom of Great Britain and Ireland by granting concessions to Roman Catholics, who formed a 75% majority of the population in Ireland, by abolishing various political restrictions under which they suffered. The king was strongly opposed to Catholic emancipation; he argued that to grant additional liberty would violate his coronation oath, in which he had promised to protect the established Church of England. Pitt, unable to change the king's strong views, resigned on 16 February 1801 so as to allow Henry Addington, his political friend, to form a new administration. This view has been corrected by Alter in his second volume on Pitt. The actual cause of the resignation was that Pitt wanted peace with France. With opposition from the King and significant figures in his Cabinet Pitt could not make a successful peace. His plan therefore was to engineer a situation where those who opposed peace would resign. Then with this crisis George III would seek Addington, Pitt's best friend to become First Minister. Pitt could then orchestrate peace behind the scenes and return to office later. Pitt therefore suddenly altered his views on Catholic Emancipation, persuaded those who refused to make peace to support him in the Catholic Question. Pitt then engineered the situation for the king to discover this hated policy was supported by the Cabinet. George III then insisted that the Question should be dropped. Pitt then used the king's demand as an excuse to offer his resignation and Pitt made the pro-war Cabinet resign. Addington was then to take his place. This plan was so successfully carried out that for over 200 years it was not seriously challenged. At about the same time, however, the king suffered a renewed bout of madness, with the consequence that Addington could not receive his formal appointment. Though he had resigned, Pitt temporarily continued to discharge his duties; on 18 February 1801, he brought forward the annual budget. Power was transferred from Pitt to Addington on 14 March, when the king recovered.

== Opposition (1801–1804) ==
=== Backbencher ===
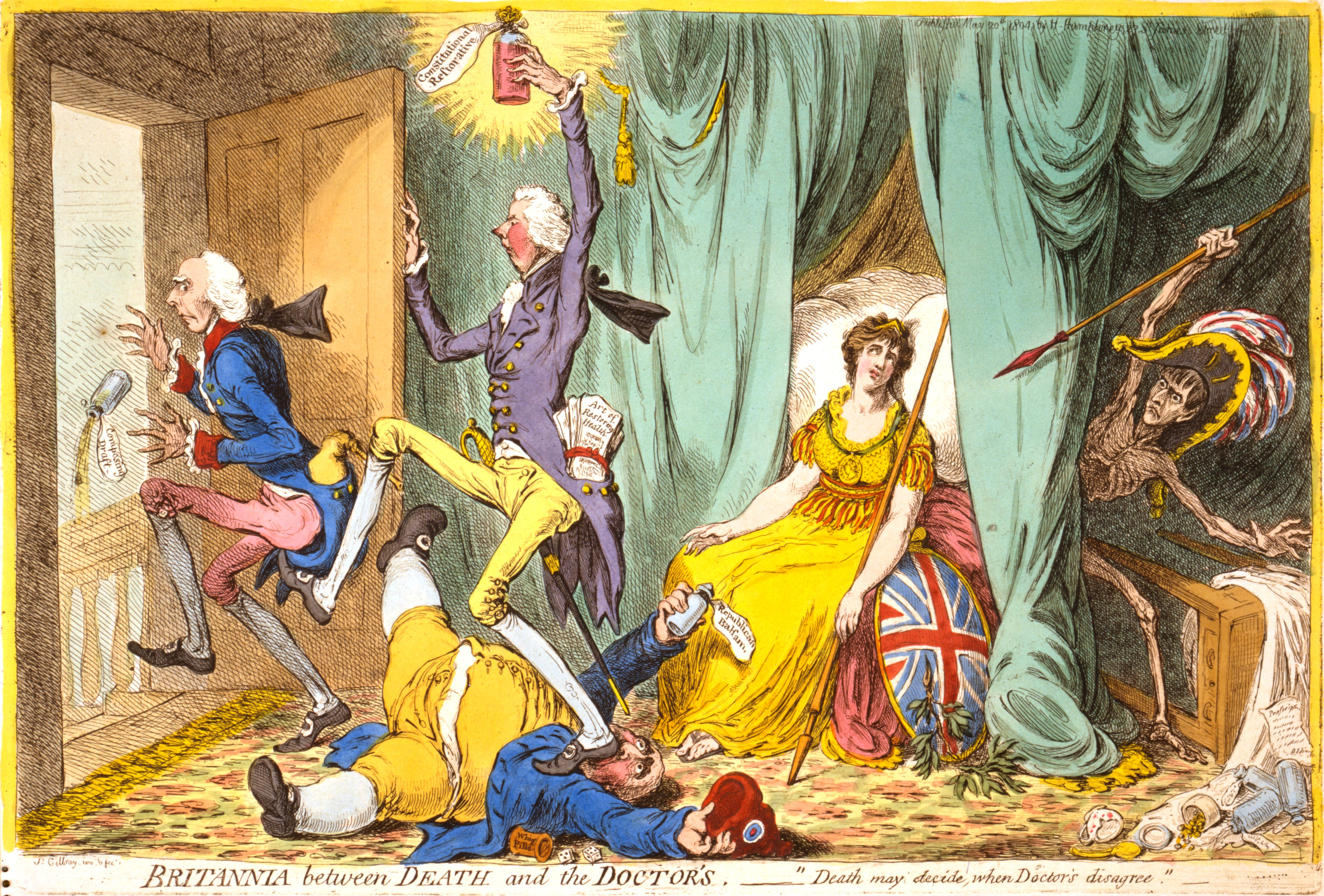
In Britannia between Death and the Doctor's (1804), Gillray caricatured Pitt as a doctor kicking Addington (the previous doctor) out of Britannia's sickroom.

Shortly after leaving office, Pitt supported the new administration under Addington, but with little enthusiasm; he frequently absented himself from Parliament, preferring to remain in his Lord Warden's residence of Walmer Castle—before 1802 usually spending an annual late-summer holiday there, and later often present from the spring until the autumn.

From the castle, he helped to organise a local Volunteer Corps in anticipation of a French invasion, acted as colonel of a battalion raised by Trinity House—he was also a Master of Trinity House—and encouraged the construction of Martello towers and the Royal Military Canal in Romney Marsh. He rented land abutting the Castle to farm on which to lay out trees and walks. His niece Lady Hester Stanhope designed and managed the gardens and acted as his hostess.

The Treaty of Amiens in 1802 between France and Britain marked the end of the French Revolutionary Wars. Everyone expected it to be only a short truce. By 1803, war had broken out again with France under Napoleon. Although Addington had previously invited him to join the Cabinet, Pitt preferred to join the Opposition, becoming increasingly critical of the government's policies. Addington, unable to face the combined opposition of Pitt and Fox, saw his majority gradually evaporate and resigned in late April 1804.

== Second premiership (1804–1806) ==
=== Reappointment ===
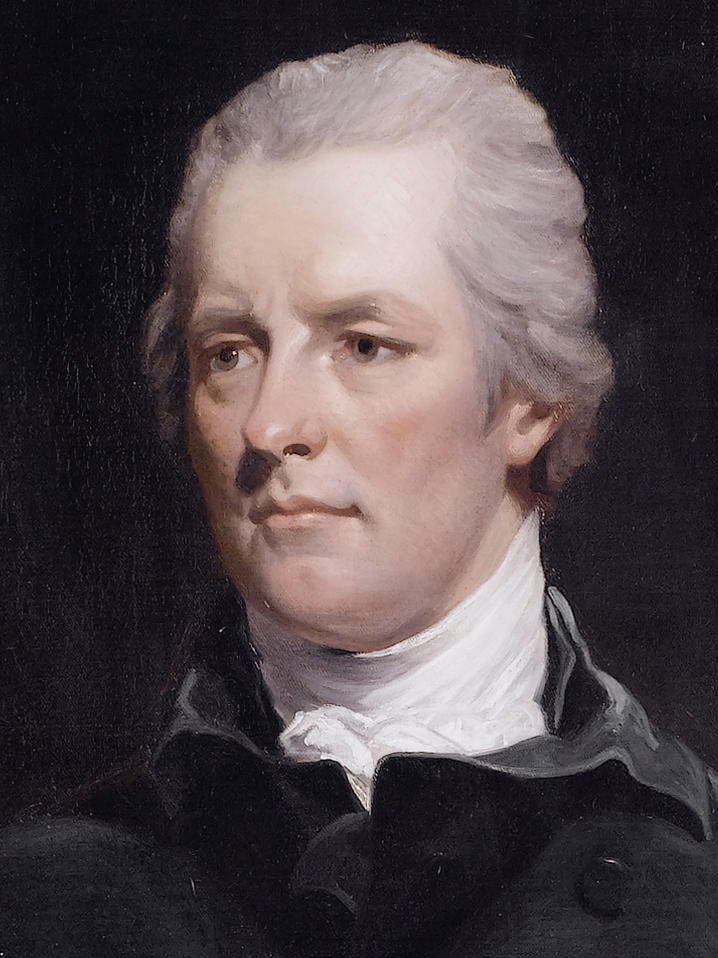
- Second premiership of Pitt the Younger; 10 May 1804 – 23 January 1806
- Monarch: George III
- Cabinet: Second Pitt ministry
- Party: Tory
- Seat: 10 Downing Street
- Coat of arms of HM Government

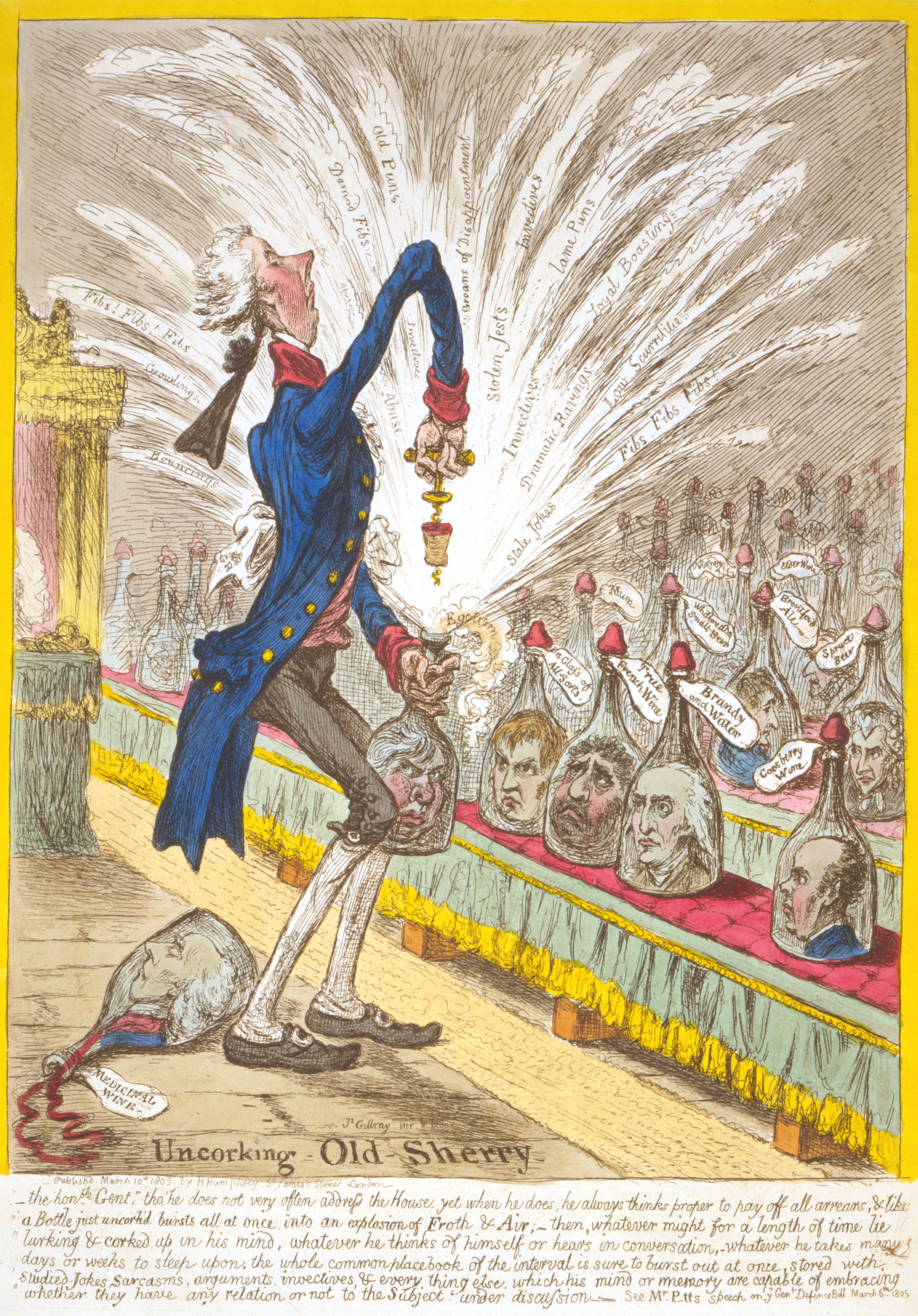
In Uncorking Old Sherry (1805), Gillray caricatured Pitt uncorking a bottle of Sheridan that is bursting out with puns and invective.

Pitt finally returned to the premiership on 10 May 1804. He had originally planned to form a broad coalition government, with both the Tories and Whigs under one government. But Pitt faced the opposition of George III to the inclusion of Fox, disliked by the king. Moreover, many of Pitt's former supporters, including the allies of Addington, joined the Opposition. Thus, Pitt's second ministry was considerably weaker than his first.

Nevertheless, Pitt formed a second government, which consisted of largely Tory members with some former ministers of the previous ministry. These include Lord Eldon as Lord Chancellor, former Foreign Secretary Lord Hawkesbury as Home Secretary, Lord Harrowby as Foreign Secretary, the former prime ministers the Duke of Portland and Addington as Lord Privy Seal and Lord President of the Council, with Pitt's prominent allies the Viscount Melville and Lord Castlereagh as First Lord of the Admiralty and Secretary of State for the Colonies, respectively.

=== Second government ===
==== Resuming war ====
By the time Pitt became prime minister in 1804, the war in Europe had been escalating for sometime since the peace of Amiens in 1801 and in 1803 the War of the Third Coalition began. Pitt's new government resumed the war effort yet again to confront the French and to defeat Napoleon. Pitt had initially allied Britain with Austria, Prussia and Russia, and now renewed the alliance with them against Napoleonic France and its allies.

The British government began placing pressure on the Emperor of the French, Napoleon. By imposing sanctions, putting up a blockade across the English Channel and undermining French naval activities, Pitt's efforts proved a success and thanks to his efforts, the United Kingdom joined the Third Coalition, an alliance that included Austria, Russia, and Sweden. In October 1805 Admiral Horatio Nelson, 1st Viscount Nelson, won a crushing victory in the Battle of Trafalgar, ensuring British naval supremacy for the remainder of the war. At the annual Lord Mayor's Banquet toasting him as "the Saviour of Europe", Pitt responded in a few words that became the most famous speech of his life:

I return you many thanks for the honour you have done me; but Europe is not to be saved by any single man. England has saved herself by her exertions, and will, as I trust, save Europe by her example.

Nevertheless, the Coalition collapsed, having suffered significant defeats at the Battle of Ulm (October 1805) and the Battle of Austerlitz (December 1805). After hearing the news of Austerlitz, Pitt referred to a map of Europe, "Roll up that map; it will not be wanted these ten years."

==== Finances ====
Pitt was an expert in finance and served as Chancellor of the Exchequer. Critical to his success in confronting Napoleon was using Britain's superior economic resources. He was able to mobilise the nation's industrial and financial resources and apply them to defeating France.

With a population of 16 million, the United Kingdom was barely half the size of France, which had a population of 30 million. In terms of soldiers, however, the French numerical advantage was offset by British subsidies that paid for a large proportion of the Austrian and Russian soldiers, peaking at about 450,000 in 1813.

Britain used its economic power to expand the Royal Navy, doubling the number of frigates and increasing the number of the larger ships of the line by 50%, while increasing the roster of sailors from 15,000 to 133,000 in eight years after the war began in 1793. The British national output remained strong, and the well-organised business sector channelled products into what the military needed. France, meanwhile, saw its navy shrink by more than half. The system of smuggling finished products into the continent undermined French efforts to ruin the British economy by cutting off markets.

By 1814 the budget that Pitt in his last years had largely shaped had expanded to £66 million, (Note: about £6 billion today) including £10 million for the Navy, £40 million for the Army, £10 million for the Allies, and £38 million as interest on the national debt. The national debt soared to £679 million, (Note: about £58 billion today) more than double the GDP. It was willingly supported by hundreds of thousands of investors and taxpayers, despite the higher taxes on land and a new income tax.

The whole cost of the war came to £831 million. The French financial system was inadequate and Napoleon's forces had to rely in part on requisitions from conquered lands.

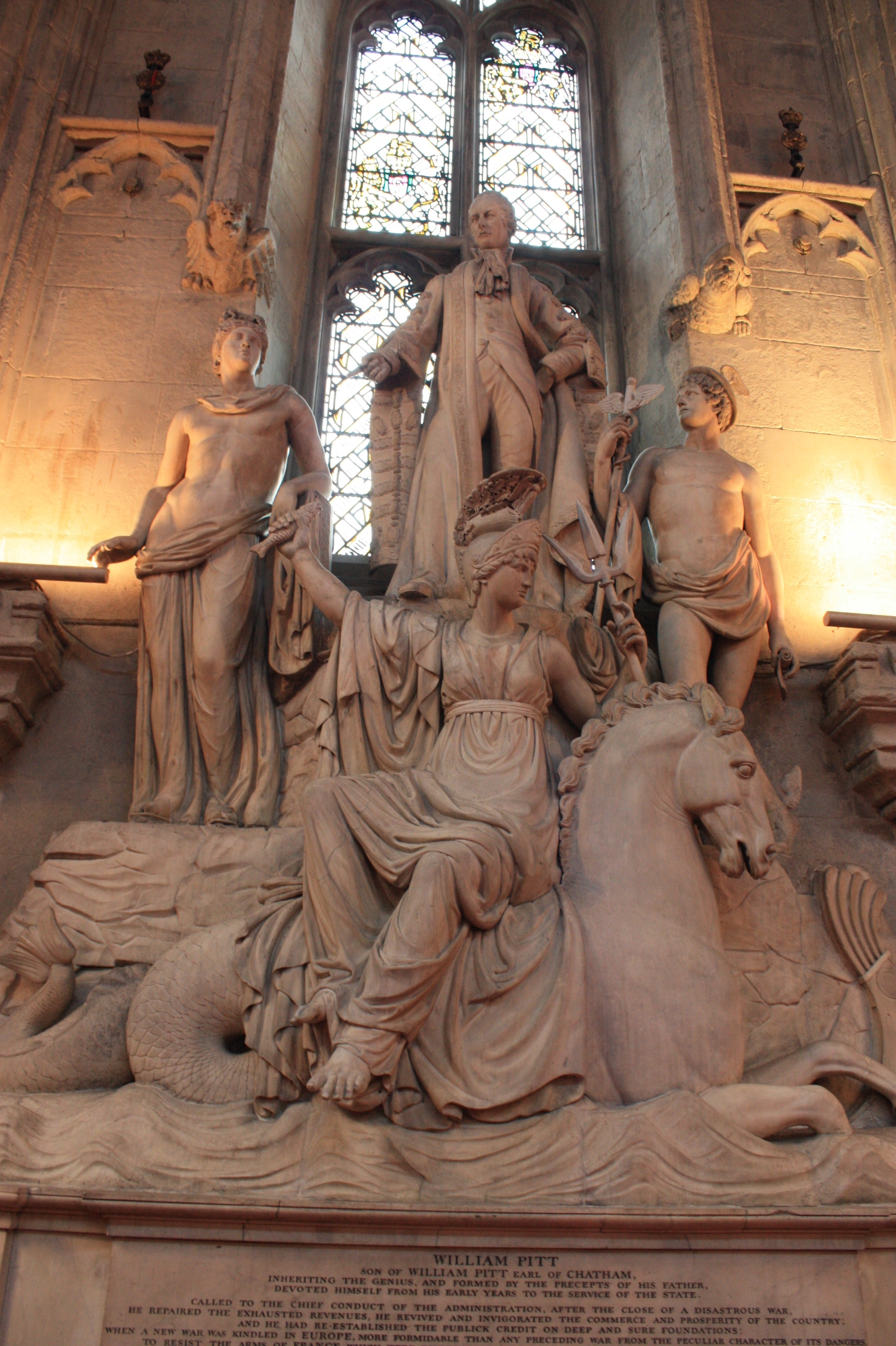
The monument to William Pitt the Younger by J. G. Bubb in the Guildhall, London, faces an equally huge monument to his father, William Pitt the Elder, in a balanced composition.

=== Death ===
The setbacks took a toll on Pitt's health. He had long suffered from poor health, beginning in childhood, and was plagued with gout and "biliousness", which was worsened by a fondness for port that began when he was advised to consume it to deal with his chronic ill health. On 23 January 1806, Pitt died at Bowling Green House on Putney Heath, probably from peptic ulceration of his stomach or duodenum; he was unmarried and left no children.

Pitt's debts amounted to £40,000 (equivalent to £3,100,000 in 2025) when he died, but Parliament agreed to pay them on his behalf. A motion was made to honour him with a public funeral and a monument; it passed despite some opposition. Pitt was buried in Westminster Abbey on 22 February, having lain in state for two days in the Palace of Westminster.

Pitt was succeeded as prime minister by his first cousin William Grenville, 1st Baron Grenville, who headed the Ministry of All the Talents, a coalition which included Charles James Fox.

== Personal life ==
Pitt became known as a "three-bottle man" in reference to his heavy consumption of port wine. Each of these bottles would be around 350 millilitres (12 US fl oz) in volume.

At one point rumours emerged of an intended marriage to Eleanor Eden, to whom Pitt had grown close. Pitt broke off the potential marriage in 1797, writing to her father, Lord Auckland, "I am compelled to say that I find the obstacles to it decisive and insurmountable".

According to his biographer William Hague, Pitt was happiest among close male friends and showed little interest in expanding his social circle or pursuing romantic relationships. He had no known female companions outside his family, prompting contemporary rumours and satirical commentary. Though some allusions were made to possible homosexual leanings, Hague concludes that Pitt was likely asexual and abstained from intimacy throughout his life, prioritizing his political ambitions.

== Legacy ==
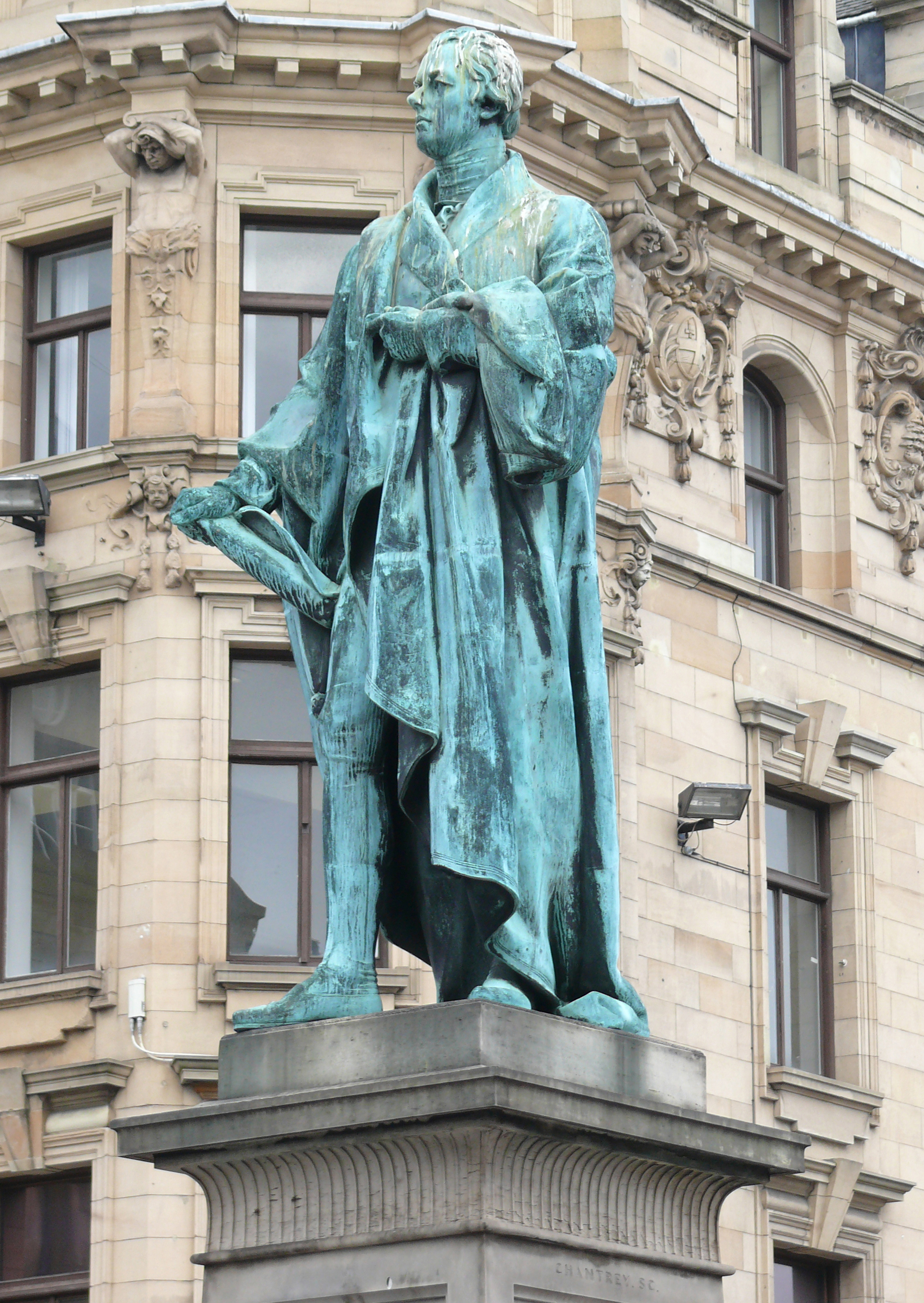
Statue in George Street, Edinburgh

Pitt was a prime minister who consolidated the powers of his office. Though he was sometimes opposed by members of his Cabinet, he helped define the role of the Prime Minister as the supervisor and co-ordinator of the various government departments. After his death the conservatives embraced him as a great patriotic hero.

One of Pitt's accomplishments was a rehabilitation of the nation's finances after the American War of Independence. Pitt made changes to the tax system in order to improve its capture of revenue, which helped manage the mounting national debt.

Some of Pitt's domestic plans were not successful; he failed to secure parliamentary reform, emancipation, or the abolition of the slave trade although this last took place with the Slave Trade Act 1807, the year after his death. The 1792 Slave Trade Bill passed the House of Commons mangled and mutilated by the modifications and amendments of Pitt; it lay for years in the House of Lords. Hague considers the unfinished abolition of the slave trade to be Pitt's greatest failure. He notes that by the end of Pitt's career, conditions were in place that would have allowed a skillful attempt to pass an abolition bill to succeed, partly because of the long campaigning Pitt had encouraged with his friend William Wilberforce. Hague goes on to note that the failure was likely due to Pitt being a "spent force" by the time favourable conditions had arisen. In Hague's opinion, Pitt's long premiership, "tested the natural limits of how long it is possible to be at the top. From 1783 to 1792, he faced each fresh challenge with brilliance; from 1793 he showed determination but sometimes faltered; and from 1804 he was worn down by ... the combination of a narrow majority and war".

Historian Marie Peters has compared his strengths and weaknesses with his father:

Having some of his father's volatility and much of the self-confidence bordering on arrogance, the younger Pitt inherited superb and carefully nurtured oratorical gifts. These gave him, like his father, unsurpassed command of the Commons and power to embody the national will in wartime. There were, however, significant differences. The younger Pitt's eloquence, unlike his father's, included the force of sustained reasoned exposition. This was perhaps in part expression of his thoroughly professional approach to politics, so unlike his father's, but possibly deriving something from Shelburne. The younger Pitt was continuously engaged in depth with major issues of his day. He regularly and energetically sought the best information. He was genuinely progressive, as his father was not, on parliamentary reform, Catholic emancipation, commercial policy, and administrative reform. His constructive capacity in his chief responsibility, financial policy and administration, far surpassed his father's record, if it was less impressive and perhaps more equally matched in foreign and imperial policy and strategy. With good reason, his long career in high office was the mirror image of his father's short tenure. In contrast, only briefly was Chatham able to rise to the challenge of his age. By his last decade time had passed him by.

== Arms ==
Coat of arms of William Pitt the Younger
Crest A stork proper beaked and membered or, resting the dexter claw on an anchor erect cabled or. Escutcheon Sable, a fess chequy argent and azure between three bezants; a crescent for difference. Motto Benigno numine (By Divine Providence)

== Cultural references ==
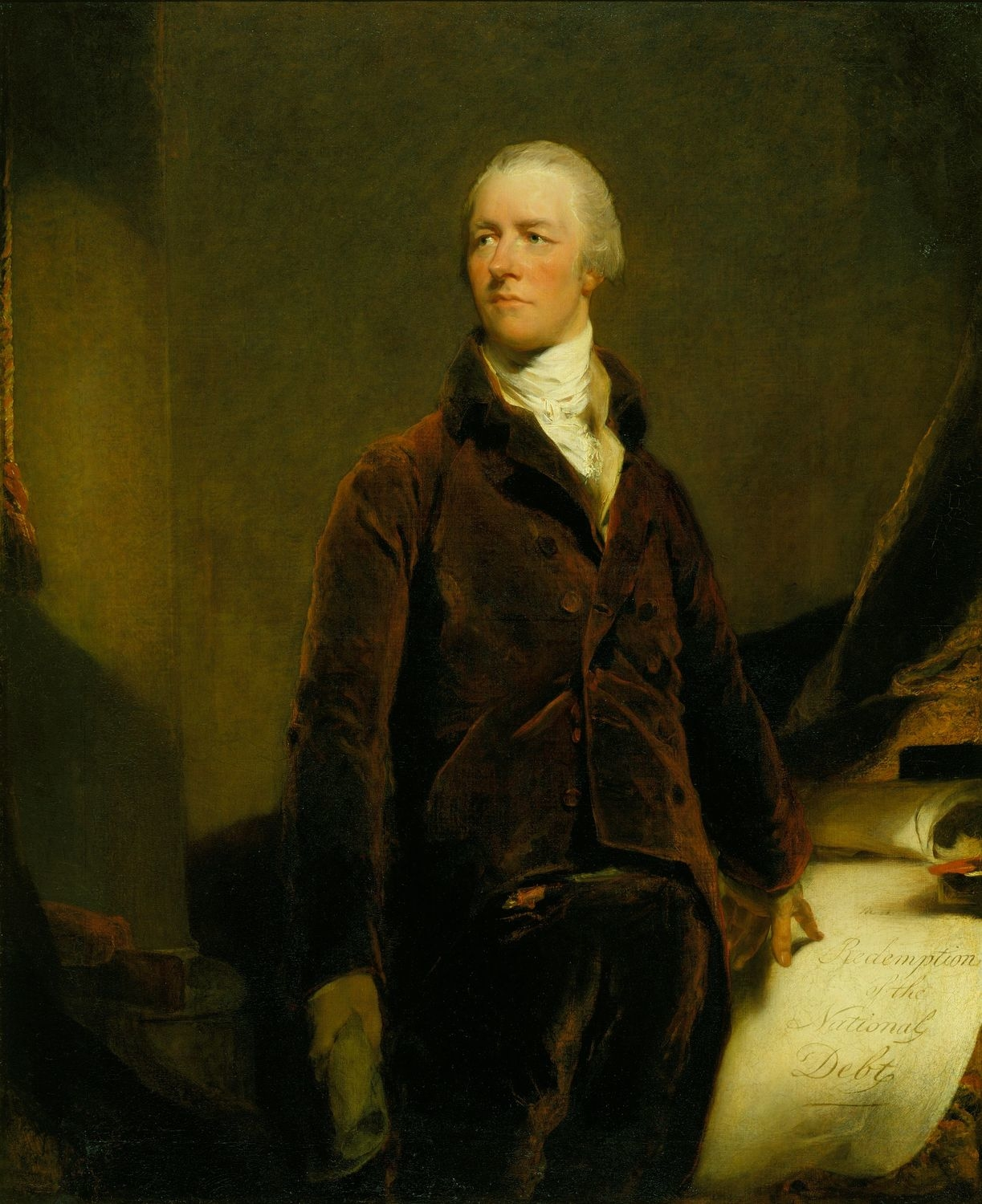
Portrait of William Pitt by Thomas Lawrence, 1807

=== Film and television ===
William Pitt is depicted in several films and television programs.

- Robert Donat portrays Pitt in the 1942 biographical film The Young Mr. Pitt, which chronicles the historical events of Pitt's life.
- Pitt's attempts during his tenure as prime minister to cope with the dementia of King George III are portrayed by Julian Wadham in the 1994 film The Madness of King George.
- The 2006 film Amazing Grace, with Benedict Cumberbatch in the role of Pitt, depicts his close friendship with William Wilberforce, the leading abolitionist in Parliament.
- Pitt is caricatured as a boy prime minister in the third series of the television comedy Blackadder, in which Simon Osborne plays a fictionalised Pitt as a petulant teenager who has just come to power "right in the middle of [his] exams" in the episode "Dish and Dishonesty". A fictionalised younger brother, "Pitt the Even Younger", appeared as a candidate standing in the Dunny-on-the-Wold by-election.
- In the series of prime ministerial biographies Number 10, produced by Yorkshire Television, Pitt was portrayed by Jeremy Brett.

=== Places named after him ===
- The University Pitt Club, a club for students at the University of Cambridge, was founded in 1835 "to do honour to the name and memory of Mr William Pitt".
- Pittwater in Australia was named in 1788 by the British explorer Arthur Phillip.
- Pitt Street is the main financial precinct street in the central business district of Sydney.
- Pitt Town, New South Wales, near Windsor outside Sydney, together with another township called Wilberforce
- Mount Pitt, second-highest mountain on Norfolk Island
- Pitt Water, a body of water in South East Tasmania
- Pitt's Head in Snowdonia, Wales, was named after the rock formation's resemblance to him.
- While Chatham County, North Carolina, was named after his father, Pittsboro, North Carolina, was named after Pitt the Younger.
- In Penang, Malaysia, Pitt Street and Pitt Lane were named for him, as British prime minister when George Town, Penang, was founded in 1786.
- Pitt Street in Kowloon, an area of Hong Kong
- Pittsburgh, Ontario
- Pitt Street in Glasgow
- Pitt Street in Windsor, Ontario
- Pitt Street in Kingston, Ontario
- Pitt Street in Cornwall, Ontario
- Rue Pitt in Montreal
- Chemin Pitt in Montreal
- Pitt Street in Sydney Mines
- Pitt Street in Saint John, New Brunswick
- Pitt House, High Wycombe, Buckinghamshire
- Pitt's Cottage in Westerham, former home of Pitt and more recently a local curry house (now closed)
- Pitt River in British Columbia
- William Pitt Avenue in Deal, Kent
- Pitt Street in Southport
- Pitt Street in Auckland

Note, Pittsburgh, Pennsylvania, was named for his father, William Pitt, 1st Earl of Chatham.

== Footnotes ==
Political offices
Preceded by Lord John Cavendish	Chancellor of the Exchequer; 1782–1783	Succeeded by Lord John Cavendish
Preceded by The Duke of Portland	Prime Minister of Great Britain; 19 December 1783 – 31 December 1800	Acts of Union 1800 merged Great Britain and Ireland to form the United Kingdom
Preceded by Lord John Cavendish	Chancellor of the Exchequer; 1783–1801	Succeeded by Henry Addington
Preceded by Lord North; Charles James Fox	Leader of the House of Commons; 1783–1801	Succeeded by Henry Addington
New title Acts of Union 1800 merged Great Britain and Ireland to form the United Kingdom	Prime Minister of the United Kingdom; 1 January 1801 – 14 March 1801	Succeeded by Henry Addington
Preceded by Henry Addington	Prime Minister of the United Kingdom; 10 May 1804 – 23 January 1806	Succeeded by The Lord Grenville
Preceded by Henry Addington	Chancellor of the Exchequer; 1804–1806	Succeeded by Lord Henry Petty
Preceded by Henry Addington	Leader of the House of Commons; 1804–1806	Succeeded by Charles James Fox
Honorary titles
Preceded by The Earl of Guilford	Lord Warden of the Cinque Ports; 1792–1806	Succeeded by The Earl of Liverpool
Parliament of Great Britain
Preceded by Philip Honywood; William Lowther	Member of Parliament for Appleby; 1781–1784; With: Philip Honywood	Succeeded by John Leveson-Gower; Richard Penn
Preceded by James Mansfield; Lord John Townshend	Member of Parliament for Cambridge University; 1784–1800; With: Earl of Euston	Parliament of Great Britain abolished
Parliament of the United Kingdom
Preceded by Parliament of the United Kingdom created	Member of Parliament for Cambridge University; 1801–1806; With: Earl of Euston	Succeeded by Earl of Euston; Lord Henry Petty
