= George Eden, 1st Earl of Auckland =

English politician and colonial administrator (1784–1849)

The Right Honourable The Earl of Auckland GCB PC
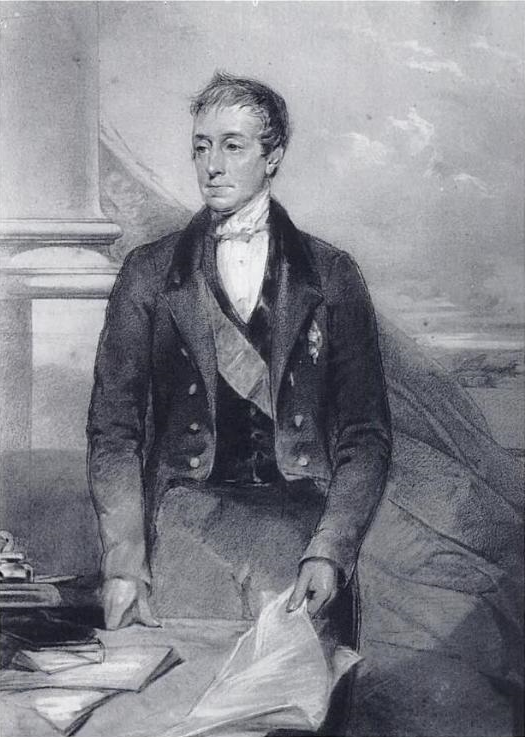

Governor-General of India
- In office 4 March 1836 – 28 February 1842
- Monarchs: William IV; Victoria
- Preceded by: Sir Charles Metcalfe (acting)
- Succeeded by: The Lord Ellenborough

President of the Board of Trade
- In office 22 November 1830 – 5 June 1834
- Prime Minister: The Earl Grey
- Preceded by: John Charles Herries
- Succeeded by: Charles Poulett Thomson

Personal details
- Born: 25 August 1784 Beckenham, Kent, England
- Died: 1 January 1849 (aged 64) Hampshire, England
- Party: Whig
- Parent(s): William Eden, 1st Baron Auckland, Eleanor Elliot
- Education: Christ Church, Oxford
- Profession: Lawyer, politician

George Eden, 1st Earl of Auckland (25 August 1784 – 1 January 1849) was an English Whig politician and colonial administrator. He was thrice First Lord of the Admiralty and also served as Governor-General of India between 1836 and 1842. The former province of Auckland, which includes the present regions of Northland, Auckland, Waikato, Bay of Plenty and Gisborne along with the city of Auckland, in New Zealand, was named after him.

== Background and education ==
Born in Beckenham, Kent, Auckland was the second son of William Eden, 1st Baron Auckland, and Eleanor, daughter of Sir Gilbert Elliot, 3rd Baronet. His sister was the traveller and author Emily Eden, who accompanied her brother to India and wrote about her experiences there. He was educated at Eton, and Christ Church, Oxford, and was called to the Bar, Lincoln's Inn, in 1809. He became heir apparent to the barony after his elder brother William Eden drowned in the Thames in 1810.

== Political career, 1810–1836 ==
Auckland was returned to Parliament for Woodstock in 1810 (succeeding his elder brother, William), a seat he held until 1812, and again between 1813 and 1814. The latter year he succeeded his father in the barony and took his seat in the House of Lords, supporting the reform party. In 1830 he became President of the Board of Trade and Master of the Mint under Lord Grey, and serving as one of the deputy Speakers of the House of Lords.

He was First Lord of the Admiralty under Grey and then Lord Melbourne in 1834 and again under Melbourne in 1835. He gave a commission to William Hobson to sail for the East Indies, which Hobson ultimately rewarded in the naming of his newly created city of Auckland, New Zealand, in 1840. Mount Eden in Auckland, the town of Eden, New South Wales and Auckland County, New South Wales were also named after him.

== Governor-General of India, 1836–1842 ==
In 1836 Lord Auckland was appointed of Governor-General of India. His private secretary was John Russell Colvin, who rose to be lieutenant-governor of the North-West Provinces and named his son Auckland Colvin after him. As a legislator, he dedicated himself especially to the improvement of native schools and the expansion of the commercial industry of India.

But complications in Afghanistan interrupted this work in 1838. Lord Auckland decided on war, and on 1 October 1838 in Simla published the Simla Manifesto, dethroning Dost Mahommed Khan. After successful early operations he was created Baron Eden, of Norwood in the County of Surrey, and Earl of Auckland. However the Afghan campaign ultimately ended in disaster. He handed over the governor-generalship to Lord Ellenborough and returned to England the following year.

== Political career, 1842–1849 ==
In 1846 he again became First Lord of the Admiralty, this time under Lord John Russell. In the words of a modern historian: "[M]inisterial talent in the House of Lords was not so plentiful as to disqualify the author of one of the worst disasters in British military history". He held this office until his death three years later.

== Personal life and character ==
Lord Auckland died on New Year's Day 1849, following what was described as a fit. He was aged 64. Lord Auckland was unmarried and on his death the earldom became extinct, while he was succeeded in the barony by his younger brother, Robert.

In a recently published (2013) history Lord Auckland is described as "a clever and capable but somewhat complacent and detached Whig nobleman". In appearance he was slim and younger looking than his years. As a respected First Lord of the Admiralty Lord Auckland depended heavily on competent staff but his indecisive personality and indifference to Indian history and culture led to disastrous decisions being made during his term as Governor-General there.

== Arms ==
Coat of arms of George Eden, 1st Earl of Auckland
Crest A dexter arm embowed in armour couped at the shoulder proper and grasping a garb or banded vert. Escutcheon Gules on a chevron argent between three garbs or banded Vert as many escallops sable. Supporters Dexter, a horse guardant argent, charged on the shoulder with a fleur-de-lis or; Sinister, a horse argent, charged on the shoulder with a tower or. Motto Si Sit Prudentia (If there be but prudence). Orders The Most Honourable Order of the Bath (Knight Grand Cross, Civil Division).

Parliament of the United Kingdom
Preceded by Sir Henry Dashwood, Bt; William Eden	Member of Parliament for Woodstock; 1810–1812; With: Sir Henry Dashwood, Bt	Succeeded by Sir Henry Dashwood, Bt; William Thornton
Preceded by Sir Henry Dashwood, Bt; William Thornton	Member of Parliament for Woodstock; 1813–1814; With: Sir Henry Dashwood, Bt	Succeeded by Sir Henry Dashwood, Bt; William Thornton
Political offices
Preceded by John Charles Herries	President of the Board of Trade; 1830–1834	Succeeded by Charles Poulett Thomson
Preceded by John Charles Herries	Master of the Mint; 1830–1834	Succeeded by James Abercromby
Preceded by The Lord Grenville	Auditor of the Exchequer; 1834	Office abolished
Preceded by Sir James Graham, Bt	First Lord of the Admiralty; 1834	Succeeded by The Earl de Grey
Preceded by The Earl de Grey	First Lord of the Admiralty; 1835	Succeeded by The Earl of Minto
Preceded by The Earl of Haddington	First Lord of the Admiralty; 1846–1849	Succeeded by Sir Francis Baring, Bt
Government offices
Preceded by Sir Charles Metcalfe, Bt (acting)	Governor-General of India; 1836–1842	Succeeded by The Lord Ellenborough
Peerage of the United Kingdom
New creation	Earl of Auckland; 1839–1849	Extinct
Peerage of Ireland
Preceded by William Eden	Baron Auckland; 1814–1849	Succeeded by Robert John Eden
Peerage of Great Britain
Preceded by William Eden	Baron Auckland; 1814–1849	Succeeded by Robert John Eden
