= Eleanor Eden =

British countess (1777–1851)

The Right Honourable The Countess of Buckinghamshire
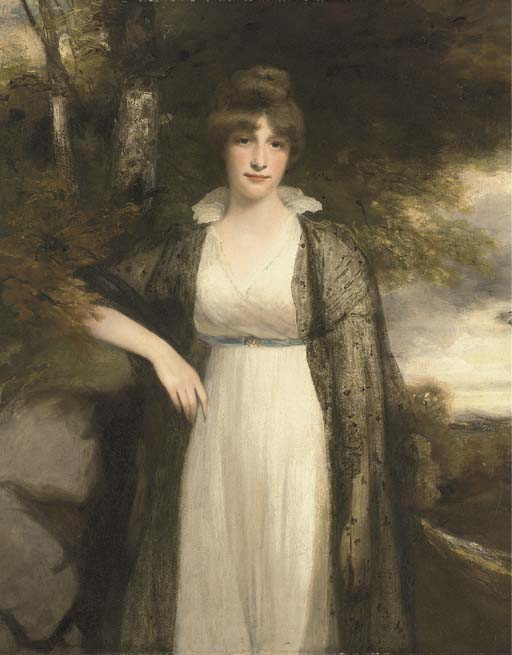
- Eleanor, Countess of Buckinghamshire, by John Hoppner (ca. 1800)
- Born: Eleanor Agnes Eden; 1777
- Died: October 1851 (aged 73–74)
- Spouse: Robert Hobart, 4th Earl of Buckinghamshire (m. 1799)
- Parent(s): William Eden, 1st Baron Auckland; Eleanor Elliot

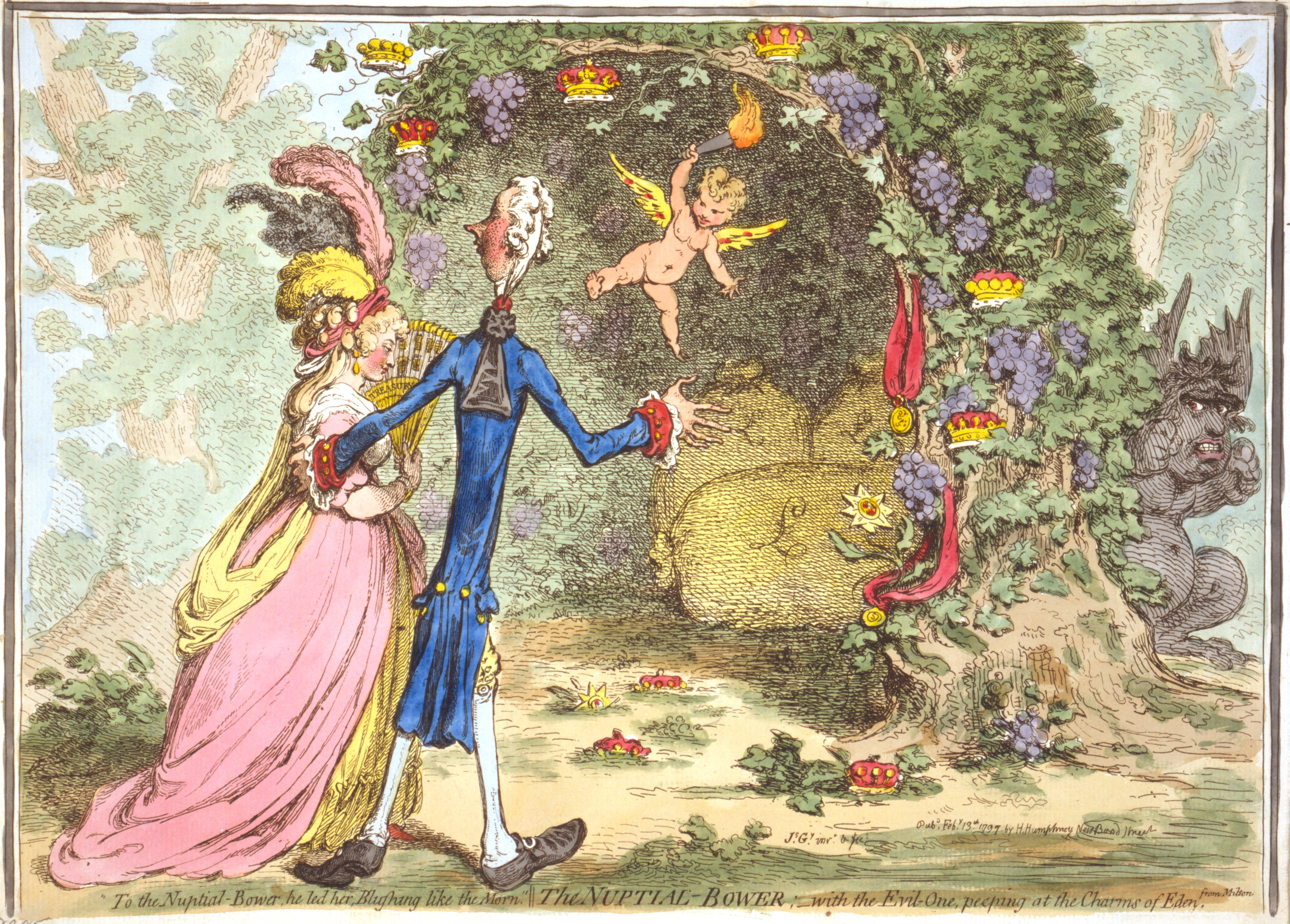
In The Nuptial-Bower (1797), James Gillray caricatured the relationship between Eleanor and Pitt.

Eleanor Agnes Hobart, Countess of Buckinghamshire (née Eden; 1777 – October 1851) was the eldest child of Lord Auckland. As a young woman, she was rumoured to have been engaged to William Pitt the Younger, the Prime Minister, but he disavowed the connection and never married.

== Early life ==
Eleanor was born the eldest child of William Eden, 1st Baron Auckland, and his wife, Eleanor Elliot, daughter of Sir Gilbert Elliot, 3rd Baronet, of Minto. Her mother was a sister of Gilbert Eliott, 1st Earl of Minto.

== Relations with Pitt ==
Pitt and Eleanor met at her father's home at Beckenham, during Pitt's repeated visits there from his own home at nearby Holwood House, near Bromley in Kent, but early in 1797 Pitt quashed spreading rumours that he intended to marry her by writing to Auckland:

"My Dear Lord... It can hardly, I think, be necessary to say that the time I have passed among your family has led to my forming sentiments of very real attachment towards them all, and of much more than attachment to one whom I need not name.... Nor should I do justice to my own feelings.... if I did not own that every hour of my acquaintance with the person to whom you will easily conceive I refer... has convinced me that whoever may have the good fortune to be united to her is destined to more than his share of human happiness.

"Whether I could have had any ground to hope that such might have been my lot, I have to reproach myself for ever having indulged the idea as far as I have done without asking myself carefully and early enough what were the difficulties in the way of it being realised.... Having now at length reflected as fully and as calmly as I am able... I am compelled to say that I find the obstacles to it decisive and insurmountable...."

Auckland replied:

"We had from an early period every reason to believe that the sentiments formed were most cordially mutual: and we saw with delight that they were ripening into an attachment which might lay the foundation of a system of most perfect happiness...."

He also tried to get Pitt to reveal what was the "insurmountable obstacle" he mentioned, but Pitt's only answer was that "further explanation or discussion can answer no good purpose."

== Marriage ==
In 1799, she married Robert Hobart, 4th Earl of Buckinghamshire, becoming his second wife. They had no children. Lord Buckinghamshire died in February 1816 at the age of 55, after falling from his horse.
