= William Eden, 1st Baron Auckland =

British diplomat and politician (1745–1814)

The Right Honourable The Lord Auckland FRS PC (Ire) MP
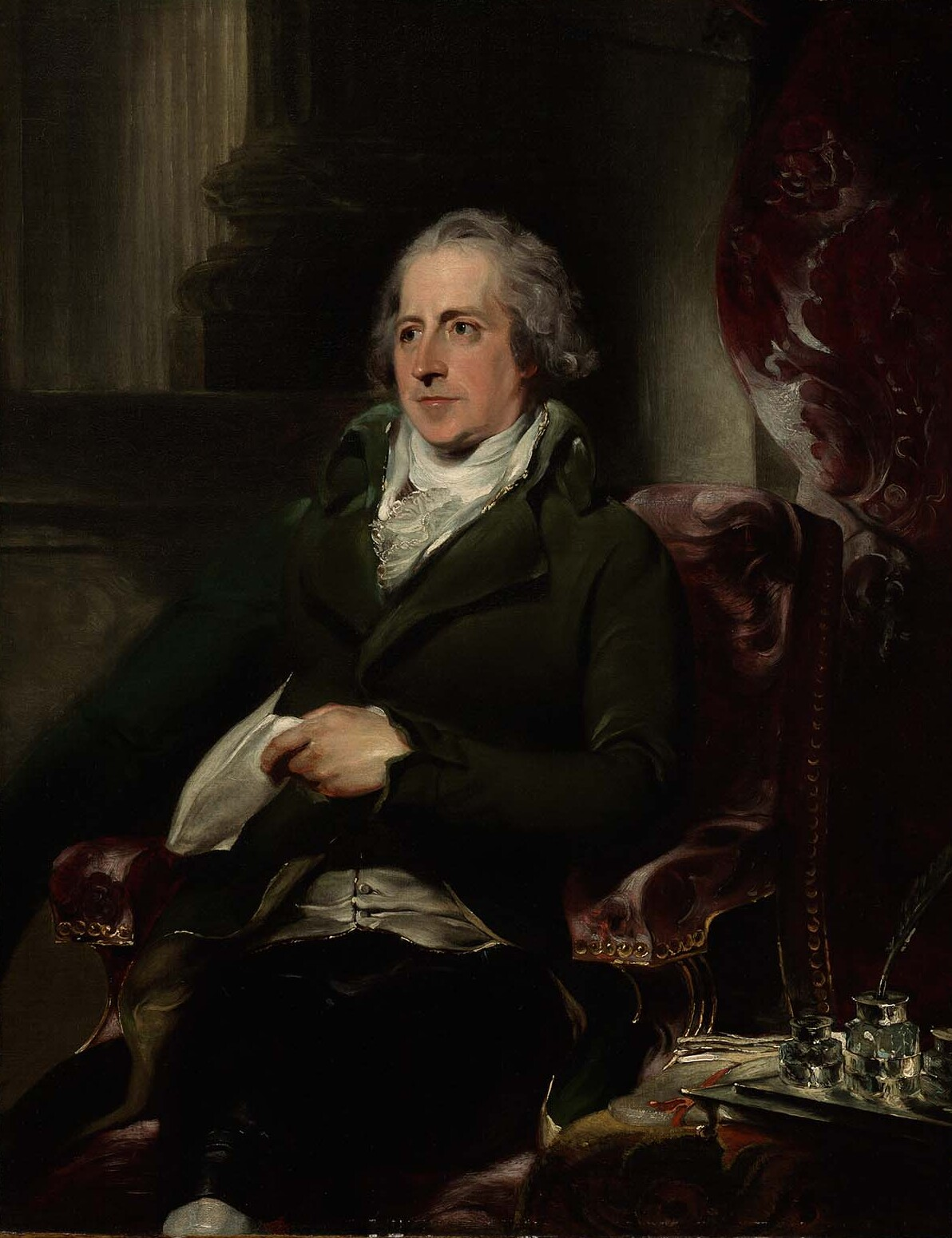
- Portrait by Thomas Lawrence, c. 1796

President of the Board of Trade
- In office 5 February 1806 – 31 March 1807
- Monarch: George III
- Prime Minister: The Lord Grenville
- Preceded by: The Duke of Montrose
- Succeeded by: The Earl Bathurst

Chief Secretary for Ireland
- In office 1780–1782
- Monarch: George III
- Prime Minister: Lord North
- Preceded by: Richard Heron
- Succeeded by: Richard FitzPatrick

Personal details
- Born: 3 April 1745
- Died: 28 May 1814 (aged 69) Beckenham, Kent
- Party: Tory (Pittite); Whig (Grenvillite)
- Spouse: Eleanor Elliot (m. 1776)
- Relations: George Osborne, 8th Duke of Leeds (grandson)
- Children: Eleanor Eden; Catharine Isabella Eden; Elizabeth Charlotte Eden; Caroline Eden; William Eden (MP); George Eden, 1st Earl of Auckland; Henry Eden; Mary Louisa Eden; Mary Dulcibella Eden; Emily Eden; Robert Eden, 3rd Baron Auckland; Frances Eden
- Education: Durham School; Eton College
- Alma mater: Christ Church, Oxford

William Eden, 1st Baron Auckland, PC (Ire), FRS, MP (3 April 1745 – 28 May 1814) was a British diplomat and politician who sat in the House of Commons from 1774 to 1793.

== Early life ==
A member of the influential Eden family, Auckland was a younger son of Sir Robert Eden, 3rd Baronet, of Windlestone Hall, County Durham, and Mary, daughter of William Davison. His brothers included Sir John Eden, 4th Baronet, also an MP; Sir Robert Eden, 1st Baronet, of Maryland, the last royal Governor of Maryland; and Morton Eden, 1st Baron Henley, diplomat.

He was educated at Durham School, Eton and Christ Church, Oxford, and was called to the bar, Middle Temple, in 1768.

== Career ==
In 1771, Auckland published Principles of Penal Law, and soon became a recognized authority on commercial and economic questions. In 1772 he took up an appointment as Under-Secretary of State for the North, a post he held until 1778. He was Member of Parliament for Woodstock from 1774 to 1784 and served as a Lord of Trade from 1776 to 1782.

In 1778, he carried an Act for the improvement of the treatment of prisoners, and accompanied the Earl of Carlisle as a commissioner to North America on an unsuccessful mission to bring an end to the American War of Independence.

During the War, he was head of the British spies in Europe, his budget reaching £200,000 by 1778. He probably oversaw a small group of intelligence collectors for Lord Suffolk. On his return in 1779 he published his widely-read Four Letters to the Earl of Carlisle.

In 1780, Auckland became Chief Secretary for Ireland, which he remained until 1782, and was admitted to the Irish Privy Council in 1780. He represented Dungannon in the Irish House of Commons between 1781 and 1783 and was Joint Vice-Treasurer of Ireland between 1783 and 1784. While in Ireland he established the National Bank.

Between 1784 and 1793, Auckland was Member of Parliament for Heytesbury. He was sworn of the British Privy Council in 1784 and served as Envoy to France from 1785 to 1787 (on a mission dealing with commerce); he was Ambassador to Spain between 1787 and 1789 and Ambassador to the Netherlands between 1789 and 1793.

In 1789, he was raised to the Peerage of Ireland as Baron Auckland and in 1793 he retired from public service, receiving a pension of £2300, and was further honoured when he was made Baron Auckland, of West Auckland in the County of Durham, in the Peerage of Great Britain.

During his retirement in the country at Beckenham, he continued his friendship with William Pitt the Younger, his nearest neighbour at Holwood House, who at one time had thoughts of marrying his daughter (see below). With Pitt's sanction he published his Remarks on the Apparent Circumstances of the War in 1795, to prepare public opinion for a peace.

He was later included in Pitt's government as Joint Postmaster General in 1798. He severely criticized Pitt's resignation in 1801, from which he had endeavoured to dissuade him, and retained office under Henry Addington. This terminated his friendship with Pitt, who excluded him from his administration in 1804 though he increased his pension. Auckland later served under Lord Grenville as President of the Board of Trade in the Ministry of All the Talents between 1806 and 1807.

His Journal and Correspondence, published in 1861–1862, throws much light on the political history of the time. The subantarctic Auckland Islands group to the south of New Zealand, discovered in 1806, were named after him, as was Eden Quay in Dublin.

== Personal life ==
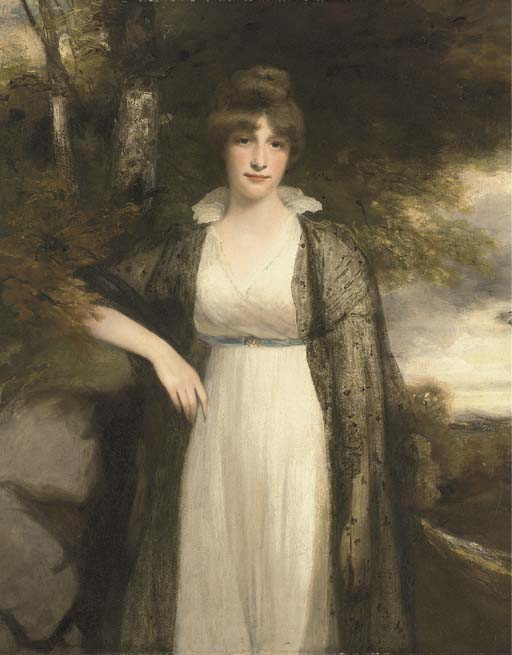
Eden's daughter Eleanor Agnes, by John Hoppner

In 1776, Lord Auckland married Eleanor Elliot, daughter of Sir Gilbert Elliot, 3rd Baronet and Agnes Dalrymple-Murray-Kynynmound (daughter and heiress of Hugh Dalrymple-Murray-Kynynmound). Eleanor was a sister of Gilbert Eliott, 1st Earl of Minto. They had six sons and eight daughters, including:

- Eleanor Agnes Eden (1777–1851), who became the subject of intense public interest in 1797 when it was rumoured that she was about to marry the Prime Minister William Pitt the Younger; when the matter became public, however, Pitt denied that he had proposed to Eleanor, much to her father's fury. Instead, she married Robert Hobart, 4th Earl of Buckinghamshire in 1799, and Pitt never married.
- Catharine Isabella Eden (1778–1810), who married Nicholas Vansittart, 1st Baron Bexley.
- Elizabeth Charlotte Eden (1780–1847), who married Francis Osborne, 1st Baron Godolphin. (Note: A description of the Godolphin life at their family seat, Gog Magog House (now destroyed), was captured in a letter by one of her younger sisters: "I invited myself of course, but [Lady] Charlotte bore it very well. I was there fifteen years ago in the capacity of a child: I therefore did not see much of her, or know anything of her and except that, have not seen her but for two or three morning visits per annum; so it was a voyage of discovery, in the style of a North Pole expedition. The Frost intense--and a good deal of hummocky ice to sail through. However, I really liked it better than expected. Lord Francis [Osborne] is particularly pleasant in his own house, and young Charlotte [the youngest child and only daughter] very civil and good-natured." Sons of the house included George, the eldest, who became 8th Duke of Leeds in 1859, and Sydney, later known for his letters to The Times on various political and social causes. He wrote about the workhouses in Ireland during the Great Famine and was with Florence Nightingale in Scutari during the Crimean War.)
- Caroline Eden (1781–1851), who married Arthur Vansittart (1775–1829) of Shottesbrooke. They were great-grandparents of T. E. Lawrence.
- William Eden (1782–1810), who was Member of Parliament for Woodstock but seemingly committed suicide by drowning in 1810.
- George Eden, 1st Earl of Auckland (1784–1849), who died unmarried.
- Henry Eden (1787–1794), who died young.
- Mary Louisa Eden (1788–1858), who married Andrew Colville, who was instrumental in opening up the Red River Colony in Manitoba, Canada to poor Scottish emigrants.
- Mary Dulcibella Eden (1793–1862), who married Charles Drummond (1790–1858), eldest son and heir of banker Charles Drummond (and grandson of William Drummond, 4th Viscount Strathallan) and Frances Dorothy Lockwood (a daughter of Rev. Edward Lockwood of Dews Hall).
- Emily Eden (1797–1869), was a poet and novelist. Her letters were edited by Violet Dickinson and published in 1919.
- Robert Eden, 3rd Baron Auckland (1799–1870), who married Mary Hurt (c. 1805–1872), the sister of Francis Hurt of Alderwasley Hall.
- Frances Eden (1801–1849)

Lord Auckland died in May 1814 and was succeeded by his second but eldest surviving son, George, who was created Earl of Auckland in 1839. Lady Auckland died in May 1818.

== Arms ==
Coat of arms of Barons Auckland
Crest A dexter arm embowed in armour couped at the shoulder proper and grasping a garb or banded vert. Escutcheon Gules on a chevron argent between three garbs or banded Vert as many escallops sable. Supporters Dexter, a horse guardant argent, charged on the shoulder with a fleur-de-lis or; Sinister, a horse argent, charged on the shoulder with a tower or. Motto Si Sit Prudentia (If there be but prudence).

== See also ==
- Jean-Charles-Pierre Lenoir

Parliament of Great Britain
Preceded by William Gordon; John Skynner	Member of Parliament for Woodstock; 1774–1784; With: John Skynner 1774–1777; Viscount Parker 1777–1784	Succeeded by Sir Henry Dashwood, Bt; Francis Burton
Preceded by Francis Burton; William à Court	Member of Parliament for Heytesbury; 1784–1793; With: William à Court 1784–1790; Michael Angelo Taylor 1790–1791; The Earl of Barrymore 1791–1793; Charles Ellis 1793	Succeeded by The Viscount Clifden; Charles Rose Ellis
Parliament of Ireland
Preceded by Charles O'Hara; Thomas Knox	Member of Parliament for Dungannon; 1781–1783; With: Charles O'Hara	Succeeded by Edmund Sexton Pery; Thomas Knox
Political offices
Preceded by Sir Richard Heron, Bt	Chief Secretary for Ireland; 1780–1782	Succeeded by Richard FitzPatrick
Preceded by The Earl of Chesterfield; The Earl of Leicester	Postmaster General; 1798–1804; With: The Earl of Leicester 1798–1799; The Baron Gower 1799–1801; Lord Charles Spencer 1801–1804	Succeeded by The Duke of Montrose; Lord Charles Spencer
Preceded by The Duke of Montrose	President of the Board of Trade; 1806–1807	Succeeded by The Earl Bathurst
Diplomatic posts
Preceded by The Earl of Chesterfield	British Ambassador to Spain; 1787–1789	Succeeded by Alleyne FitzHerbert
Preceded by Alleyne FitzHerbert	British Ambassador to the Netherlands; 1789–1790	Succeeded by Lord Henry Spencer
Peerage of Ireland
New creation	Baron Auckland; 1789–1814	Succeeded by George Eden
Peerage of Great Britain
New creation	Baron Auckland; 1793–1814	Succeeded by George Eden
