= Emily Eden =

English poet and novelist (1797–1869)

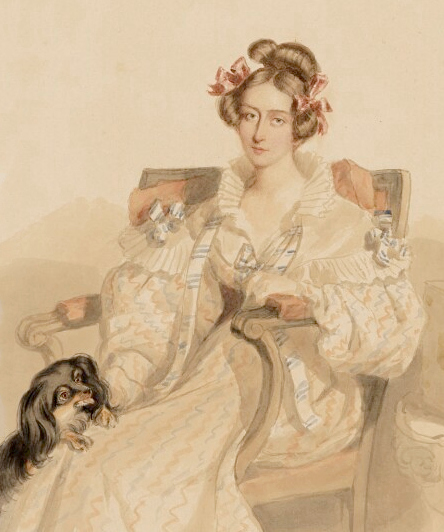
- Emily Eden, 1835
- Born: 3 March 1797; Westminster
- Died: 5 August 1869 (aged 72)
- Occupations: Poet, Novelist
- Notable work: Up The Country: Letters Written to Her Sister from the Upper Provinces of India (1867); The Semi-Detached House (1859); The Semi-Attached Couple (1860)
- Parents: William Eden, 1st Baron Auckland (father); Eleanor Elliot (mother)

Emily Eden (3 March 1797 – 5 August 1869) was an English poet and novelist who gave witty accounts of life in the 19th century. She wrote a celebrated account of her travels in India, and two novels that sold well. She was also an accomplished amateur artist.

== Family ties ==
Born in Westminster, Eden was the seventh daughter of William Eden, 1st Baron Auckland, and his wife Eleanor Elliot. She was the great-great-great-aunt of Prime Minister Anthony Eden.

== The India years ==
In her late thirties, she and her sister Fanny travelled to India, where her brother George Eden, 1st Earl of Auckland was in residence as Governor-General from 1835 to 1842. She wrote accounts of her time there, which were journal-letters to her other sister, Mary Drummond, later collected in the volume Up The Country: Letters Written to Her Sister from the Upper Provinces of India (1867). While the emphasis of her Indian writings was on travel descriptions, local colour and details of the ceremonial and social functions that she attended, Eden also provided a perceptive record of the major political events that occurred during her brother's term of office. These included the total destruction of a British and Indian army during the retreat from Kabul in 1842, a disaster for which George Eden was held partly responsible.

Eden was also an artist who, during her years in India, created portraits and paintings of Indian princes, soldiers, and servants with both technical skill and "psychological insights". Her book, Portraits of the Princes and People of India, was published in 1844. It contained 24 lithographs that were drawn from her sketches of important Indian subjects such as Dost Muhammad Khan and Ranjit Singh.

Eden also collected coins.

== Fiction ==
Eden wrote two successful novels: The Semi-Detached House (1859) and The Semi-Attached Couple (1860). Semi-detached houses were becoming a more widespread form of dwelling for the middle classes, as Britain continued to industrialise and urbanise. The latter book was written in 1829, but not published until 1860. Both have a comic touch that critics have compared with that of Jane Austen, who was Eden's favourite author. The first of the two has been described by John Sutherland as "an accomplished study in the social contrasts of aristocratic style, bourgeois respectability and crass vulgarity."

Eden's letters were published by Violet Dickinson, a close friend of Virginia Woolf. They contain memorable comments on English public life, most famously her welcome for the new King William IV as "an immense improvement on the last unforgiving animal George IV — this man at least wishes to make everybody happy."

Emily Eden's niece Eleanor Lena Eden also took to writing, mainly children's books under the pseudonym Lena. The structure of her 1867 novel Dumbleton Common, which has "Little Miss Patty" detailing gossip in a hamlet outside London, was inspired by Cranford.

== Lord Melbourne ==
Emily Eden never married and was financially well enough off not to need to write, but did so out of passion. After the death of Lady Caroline Lamb, mutual friends hoped she might marry Lord Melbourne, who had become a close friend, although she claimed to find him "bewildering" and to be shocked by his profanity. Melbourne's biographer Lord David Cecil remarks that it might have been an excellent thing if they had married, but "love is not the child of wisdom, and neither of them wanted to."

== Personality ==
Her letters explored London, the colonies, and the high seas. Prudence Hannay argues that armed with "strong feelings and a forthright outlook on life, acute powers of observation and a gift of beautifully translating into words the sense of the ridiculous", she devoted her life to writing. In a 2013 history of her brother's term as Governor General of India, Emily Eden is described as a "waspish but adoring" sister, whose diary was to become one of the most celebrated travel accounts of the period.
