= Eden baronets of West Auckland (1672) =

Eden baronets
- Coat of arms of the Eden baronets of West Auckland
- Creation date: 1672
- Status: extant
- Seat: Fritham
- Former seat: Windlestone Hall
- Motto: Si Sit Prudentia ("If there be but prudence")
- Arms: Gules on a chevron Argent between three garbs Or banded Vert as many escallops Sable
- Crest: A dexter arm embowed in armour couped at the shoulder proper and grasping a garb fesswise as in the Arms banded Vert

The Eden baronetcy of West Auckland was created in the Baronetage of England on 13 November 1672 for the barrister Robert Eden, subsequently Member of Parliament for County Durham. His grandfather Robert Eden of Windlestone was a supporter of the Royalist cause in the English Civil War, nominated as a Knight of the Royal Oak.

The 2nd and 4th Baronets also represented County Durham in the House of Commons. The 4th Baronet assumed the additional surname of Johnson. On his death in 1844, unmarried, the title was inherited by Sir William Eden, 4th Baronet, of the second creation, who became also the 6th Baronet of West Auckland as well. He served as High Sheriff of Durham in 1848.

The 9th and 7th Baronet was a Conservative politician. On 3 October 1983 he was created a life peer as Baron Eden of Winton, of Rushyford in the County of Durham, in the Peerage of the United Kingdom.

Windlestone Hall was the family seat from the 17th to the 20th century. In 1949 it was at Fritham, near Lyndhurst, Hampshire.

== Eden baronets, of West Auckland (1672) ==
- Sir Robert Eden, 1st Baronet (c. 1644–1720)
- Sir John Eden, 2nd Baronet (1677–1728)
- Sir Robert Eden, 3rd Baronet (1717–1755)
- Sir John Eden, 4th Baronet (1740–1812)
- Sir Robert Johnson-Eden, 5th Baronet (1774–1844)
- Sir William Eden, 6th and 4th Baronet (1803–1873) (had previously succeeded as 4th Baronet of Maryland)
- Sir William Eden, 7th and 5th Baronet (1849–1915)
- Sir Timothy Calvert Eden, 8th and 6th Baronet (1893–1963)
- Sir John Benedict Eden, 9th and 7th Baronet (1925–2020) (created Baron Eden of Winton in 1983)
- The Hon. Sir Robert Frederick Calvert Eden, 10th and 8th Baronet (born 1964)

The heir presumptive is the present holder's brother Hon. John Edward Morton Eden (born 1966).

== Extended family ==
- William Eden, 1st Baron Auckland, was the third son and Morton Eden, 1st Baron Henley, the fifth son of the 3rd Baronet, of West Auckland (see Baron Auckland and Baron Henley for more information on these branches of the family).
- George Wilfrid Eden (1903–1986), son of Lieutenant-Colonel John Henry Eden, eldest son of the Rev. John Patrick Eden, son of Thomas Eden (b. 1787), eldest son of Thomas Eden, fourth son of the 3rd Baronet of West Auckland, was a brigadier in the British Army.
- William Hassell Eden, a General in the British Army and Colonel of the 90th Regiment of Foot.
- Archibald James Fergusson Eden, an officer of the Oxford and Buckinghamshire Light Infantry and Brigadier General in the British Army during WWI.
- William Rushbrooke Eden, a Royal Artillery officer and Brigadier General in the British Army during WWI.
- Robert Eden (1836–1907), a grandson of Morton Eden, 1st Baron Henley, fought in the American Civil War with the 37th Wisconsin Volunteers, was editor of the Northwestern newspaper, and became senior engineer with the Edison Light Co.
- Rodney Eden (1853–1940), third son of the aforementioned John Patrick, was Bishop of Wakefield from 1897 to 1928.
- Henry Charles Hamilton Eden CBE MC* (1883–1963), son of Charles Hamilton Eden, fourth son of the aforementioned John Patrick, was a brigadier in the British Army.
- Anthony Eden, 1st Earl of Avon, Prime Minister of the United Kingdom, was the third son of Sir William Eden, 7th and 5th Baronet (see the Earl of Avon for more information on this branch of the family).

== Eden family tree ==
Eden Family Tree
- Sir Robert Eden, 1st Baronet, of West Auckland (d. 1720) m. Margaret Lambton
  - Sir John Eden, 2nd Baronet (1677–1728) m. Catherine Shafto
    - Sir Robert Eden, 3rd Baronet (ca.1715–1755) m. Mary Davison
      - Sir John Eden, 4th Baronet (1740–1812) m. (1) Catherine Thompson; m. (2) Dorothea Johnson
        - Sir Robert Johnson-Eden, 5th Baronet (1774–1844)
      - Sir Robert Eden, 1st Baronet, of Maryland (1741–1784) m. Caroline Calvert (b. c. 1745) (daughter of Charles Calvert, 5th Baron Baltimore)
        - Sir Frederick Eden, 2nd Baronet (1766–1809) m. Anne Smith
          - Sir Frederick Eden, 3rd Baronet (c. 1794–1814)
          - Caroline Eden (c. 1801–1854) m. Vice-Admiral Hyde Parker (1784–1854)
          - Sir William Eden, 6th and 4th Baronet (1803–1873) m. Elfrida Susanna Harriet Iremonger (1825–1885)
            - Sir William Eden, 7th and 5th Baronet (1849–1915) m. Sybil Frances Grey (1867–1945)
              - Elfrida Marjorie Eden (1887–1943) m. Leopold Greville, 6th Earl of Warwick
                - Charles Greville, 7th Earl of Warwick m. (1) Rose Bingham; m. (2) Mary Kathleen Hopkinson; m. (3) Janine Josephine Detry de Mares
              - John "Jack" Eden (1888–1914)
              - Sir Timothy Eden, 8th and 6th Baronet (1893–1963)
                - John Eden, Baron Eden of Winton (1925–2020) m. (1) Belinda Jane Pascoe; m. (2) Margaret Ann Gordon (former wife of the 9th Earl of Perth)
                  - Sir Robert Eden, 10th and 8th Baronet (b. 1964)
                  - Hon. John "Jack" Eden (b. 1966)
              - Anthony Eden, Earl of Avon (1897–1977) m. (1) Beatrice Beckett; m. (2) Clarissa Spencer-Churchill
                - Simon Gascoigne Eden (1924–1945)
                - Robert Eden (b. and d. 1928)
                - Nicholas Eden, 2nd Earl of Avon (1930–1985)
              - Nicholas William Eden (1900–1916)
          - Robert Eden (1804–1886) m. Emma Park
          - George Morton Eden (1806–1862)
          - Sir Charles Eden (1808–1878) m. (1) Emma Williams; m. (2) Fanny Cecilia Grenville
      - William Eden, 1st Baron Auckland (1745–1814) m. Eleanor Elliot (daughter of Sir Gilbert Elliot, 3rd Baronet)
        - Hon. Eleanor Eden (1777–1851) m. Robert Hobart, 4th Earl of Buckinghamshire
        - Hon. Catharine Eden (1778–1810) m. Nicholas Vansittart, 1st Baron Bexley
        - Hon. Elizabeth Eden (1780–1847) m. Francis Osborne, 1st Baron Godolphin
        - Hon. William Eden (1782–1810)
        - George Eden, 1st Earl of Auckland (1784–1849)
        - Robert Eden, 3rd Baron Auckland (1799–1870) m. Mary Hurt (c. 1805–1872)
          - William Eden, 4th Baron Auckland (1829–1890) m. (1) Lucy Walbanke Childers (c. 1836–1870); m (2) Lady Mabel Finch-Hatton (1849–1872) (daughter of George Finch-Hatton, 11th Earl of Winchilsea); m. (3) Edith Eden (daughter of Sir William Eden, 6th and 4th Baronet)
            - William Eden, 5th Baron Auckland (1859–1917) m. Sybil Constance Hutton (d. 1955)
              - Frederick Eden, 6th Baron Auckland (1895–1941) m. (1) Susan Livingstone Hartridge; m. (2) Constance Caroline Hart-Faure
            - Hon. George Eden (1861–1924)
              - Geoffrey Eden, 7th Baron Auckland (1891–1955) m. Dorothy Ida Harvey (d. 1964)
              - Terence Eden, 8th Baron Auckland (1892–1957) m. Evelyn Vane Drummond (d. 1971)
                - Ian Eden, 9th Baron Auckland (1926–1997) m. Dorothy Margaret Manser JP (c. 1926–2006)
                  - Robert Eden, 10th Baron Auckland (b. 1962)
                - Hon. Ronald Eden (1931–2006) m. Alicia Claire Needham
                  - Henry Eden (b. 1958)
      - Morton Eden, 1st Baron Henley (1752–1830) m. Elizabeth Henley (d. 1821) (daughter of Robert Henley, 1st Earl of Northington)
        - Frederick Eden (1784–1823)
        - Robert Henley, 2nd Baron Henley (1789–1841) m. Harriet Eleanora Peel (daughter of Sir Robert Peel, 1st Baronet)
          - Anthony Henley, 3rd Baron Henley (1825–1898) m. (1) Julia Emily Augusta Peel; m. (2) Clara Campbell Lucy Jekyll
            - Frederick Henley, 4th Baron Henley (1849–1923) m. Augusta Frederica Langham (1847–1905) (sister of Sir Herbert Langham, 12th Bt.)
            - Anthony Henley, 5th Baron Henley (1858–1925) m. (1) Georgiana Caroline Mary Williams; m. (2) Emmeline Stuart Maitland
            - Brig. Gen. Hon. Anthony Henley (1873–1925) m. Hon Sylvia Stanley OBE (d. 1980) (daughter of Edward Stanley, 4th Baron Stanley of Alderley)
            - Francis Eden, 6th Baron Henley (1877–1962) m. Lady Dorothy Howard (d. 1968) (daughter of George Howard, 9th Earl of Carlisle)
              - Michael Eden, 7th Baron Henley (1914–1977) m. (1) Elizabeth Hobhouse; m. (2) Nancy Mary Walton
                - Oliver Eden, 8th Baron Henley (b. 1953) m. Caroline Patricia Sharp
                  - Hon. John Eden (born 1988)

Eden family tree, including the Eden baronets, Barons Auckland, Barons Henley, and Earls of Northington

Eden baronets, of West Auckland, 1672
Robert Eden c. 1644–1720; 1st Baronet of West Auckland
John Eden; 1677–1728; 2nd Baronet of West Auckland
Baron Henley, of Grainge, 1760; Earl of Northington, 1764
Robert Eden; 1717–1755; 3rd Baronet of West Auckland	Robert Henley; 1708–1772; 1st Earl of Northington, etc.
Eden baronets of Maryland, 1776	Baron Auckland (Ire), 1789; Baron Auckland (GB), 1793	Baron Henley, of Chardstock (2nd creation) 1799
John Eden; 1740–1812; 4th Baronet of West Auckland	Robert Eden; 1741–1784; 1st Baronet of Maryland	William Eden; 1744–1814; 1st Baron Auckland	Morton Eden; 1752–1830; 1st Baron Henley	Elizabeth Henley d. 1821	Robert Henley; 1747–1786; 2nd Earl of Northington, etc.
Earldom of Northington and Barony Henley (1st creations) extinct, 1786
Robert Johnson-Eden; 1774–1844; 5th Baronet of West Auckland	Frederick Morton Eden; 1766–1809; 2nd Baronet of Maryland
Earl of Auckland and Baron Eden, 1839
Frederick Eden c. 1794–1814; 3rd Baronet of Maryland	William Eden; 1803–1873; 6th Baronet of West Auckland, 4th Baronet of Maryland	also: Bishop Robert Eden; 1804–1886 Lt. Gen. George Morton Eden; 1806–1862 Adm. Charles Eden; 1808–1878	George Eden; 1784–1849; 1st Earl of Auckland, etc., 2nd Baron Auckland	also: Eleanor Agnes Eden; 1777–1851 William Eden; 1782–1810 Henry Eden; 1786–1794 Emily Eden; 1797–1869	Robert John Eden; 1799–1870; 3rd Baron Auckland	Frederick Eden; 1784–1823	Robert Eden; 1789–1841; 2nd Baron Henley
Eden barony and earldom extinct, 1849
Baron Northington of Watford in the County of Northampton, 1885 (2nd creation)
William George Eden; 1829–1890; 4th Baron Auckland	Anthony Henley Henley; 1825–1898; 3rd Baron Henley, 1st Baron Northington
William Morton Eden; 1849–1915; 7th Baronet of West Auckland, 5th Baronet of Maryland	Edith Eden	William Morton Eden; 1859–1917; 5th Baron Auckland	George Eden; 1861–1924	Frederick Henley; 1849–1923; 4th Baron Henley, 2nd Baron Northington	Anthony Earnest Henley; 1858–1925; 5th Baron Henley, 3rd Baron Northington	Francis Robert Eden; 1877–1962; 6th Baron Henley, 4th Baron Northington
Earl of Avon and Viscount Eden, 1961
Timothy Calvert Eden; 1893–1963; 8th Baronet of West Auckland, 6th Baronet of Maryland	Robert Anthony Eden; 1897–1977; 1st Earl of Avon, etc.	Lt. William Eden; 1892–1915	Frederick Colvin George Eden; 1895–1941; 6th Baron Auckland	Geoffrey Morton Eden; 1891–1955; 7th Baron Auckland	Terence Eden; 1892–1957; 8th Baron Auckland	Michael Francis Eden; 1914–1977; 7th Baron Henley, 5th Baron Northington
Baron Eden of Winton, 1983
John Benedict Eden; 1925–2020; 9th Baronet of West Auckland, 7th Baronet of Maryland	Nicholas Eden; 1930–1985; 2nd Earl of Avon, etc.	Ian George Eden; 1926–1997; 9th Baron Auckland	Ronald Eden; 1931–2006
Barony Eden extinct, 1985	Earldom of Avon and Viscounty Eden extinct, 1985
Robert Frederick Calvert Eden b. 1964; 10th Baronet of West Auckland, 8th Baronet of Maryland	Robert Ian Burnard Eden b. 1962; 10th Baron Auckland	Henry Vane Eden b. 1958	Oliver Michael Robert Eden b. 1953; 8th Baron Henley, 6th Baron Northington
Harry Eden; 1989–1989	Oliver Eden b. 1990	John Michael Oliver Eden b. 1988

== Line of succession ==
Line of succession
- Sir Robert Eden, 1st Baronet, of West Auckland (died 1720)
  - Sir John Eden, 2nd Baronet (died 1728)
    - Sir Robert Eden, 3rd Baronet (died 1755)
      - Sir John Eden, 4th Baronet (1740–1812)
        - Sir Robert Johnson-Eden, 5th Baronet (1774–1844)
      - Sir Robert Eden, 1st Baronet (1741–1784)
        - Sir Frederick Morton Eden, 2nd Baronet (1776–1809)
          - Sir Frederick Eden, 3rd Baronet (1794–1814)
          - Sir William Eden, 6th and 4th Baronet (1803–1873)
            - Sir William Eden, 7th and 5th Baronet (1849–1915)
              - Sir Timothy Eden, 8th and 6th Baronet (1893–1963)
                - John Eden, Baron Eden of Winton 9th and 7th Baronet (1925–2020) (created Baron Eden of Winton in 1983)
                  - The Hon. Sir Robert Eden, 10th and 8th Baronet (b. 1964)
                  - (1) The Hon. John Eden (b. 1966)
                    - (2) Nicholas Eden (b. 1997)
              - Anthony Eden, 1st Earl of Avon (1897–1977)
                - Nicholas Eden, 2nd Earl of Avon (1930–1985)
          - Robert Eden (1804–1886)
            - Frederick Eden (1829–1917)
              - Rowland Eden (1874–1948)
                - Frederick Eden (1904–1985)
                  - (3) John Eden (b. 1948)
          - George Morton Eden (1806–1862)
            - Charles Eden (1837–1878)
              - Morton Eden (1865–1948)
                - Robert Eden (1916–2014)
                  - (4) Michael Eden (b. 1960)
      - William Eden, 1st Baron Auckland (1745–1814)
        - The Hon. William Eden (1782–1810)
        - George Eden, 1st Earl of Auckland (1784–1849)
        - The Hon. Morton Eden (1795–1821)
        - Robert Eden, 3rd Baron Auckland (1799–1870)
          - William Eden, 4th Baron Auckland (1829–1890)
            - William Eden, 5th Baron Auckland (1859–1917)
              - The Hon. William Eden (1892–1915)
              - Frederick Eden, 6th Baron Auckland (1895–1941)
            - The Hon. George Eden (1861–1924)
              - Geoffrey Eden, 7th Baron Auckland (1891–1955)
              - Terence Eden, 8th Baron Auckland (1892–1957)
                - Ian Eden, 9th Baron Auckland (1926–1997)
                  - (5) Robert Eden, 10th Baron Auckland (b. 1962)
                - The Hon. Ronald Eden (1931–2006)
                  - (6, 1) Henry Eden (b. 1958)
                    - (7, 2) Oliver Eden (b. 1990)
                  - Edward Eden (1959–2019)
                    - (8, 3) William Eden (b. 1991)
          - Robert Eden (1840–1916)
            - William Eden (1868–1939)
              - Edward Eden (1898–1968)
                - (9, 4) Ernest Eden (b. 1943)
                - (10, 5) William Eden (b. 1945)
                  - (11, 6) Joseph Eden (b. 1945)
      - Thomas Eden (–1805)
        - Thomas Eden (1787–1845)
          - John Eden (1813–1885)
            - John Eden (1851–1931)
              - George Eden (1903–1986)
                - (12) John Eden (b. 1950)
            - George Eden (1853–1940)
              - Gerald Eden (1896–1970)
                - John Eden (1939–1992)
                  - (13) Anthony Eden (b. 1965)
                    - (14) John Eden (b. 1994)
                  - (15) Jeremy Eden (b. 1967)
            - George Eden (1855–1921)
              - Henry Eden (1889–1963)
                - Michael Eden (1921–1944)
                  - (16) Peter Eden (b. 1944)
                    - (17) Rupert Eden (b. 1972)
        - Robert Eden (1800–1879)
          - Charles Eden (1839–1900)
            - Guy Eden (1864–1954)
              - Adrian Eden (1911–1980)
                - (18) Robin Eden (b. 1943)
                - (19) John Eden (b. 1949)
                  - (20) Christopher Eden (b. 1978)
                  - (21) Nicholas Eden (b. 1996)
      - Morton Eden, 1st Baron Henley (1752–1830)
        - Robert Henley, 2nd Baron Henley (1789–1841)
          - Anthony Henley, 3rd Baron Henley (1825–1898) (created Baron Northington in 1885)
            - Frederick Henley, 4th Baron Henley, 2nd Baron Northington (1849–1923)
            - Anthony Henley, 5th Baron Henley, 3rd Baron Northington (1858–1925)
            - The Hon. Anthony Henley (1873–1925)
            - Francis Eden, 6th Baron Henley, 4th Baron Northington (1877–1962)
              - Michael Eden, 7th Baron Henley, 5th Baron Northington (1914–1977)
                - (22) Oliver Eden, 8th Baron Henley, 6th Baron Northington (b. 1953)
                  - (23, 1) The Hon. John Eden (b. 1988)
                  - (24, 2) The Hon. Patrick Eden (b. 1993)
                  - (25, 3) The Hon. Edward Eden (b. 1996)
                - (26, 4) The Hon. Andrew Eden (b. 1955)
              - The Hon. Roger Eden (1922–2016)
                - (27, 5) Morton Eden (b. 1949)
                  - (28, 6) William Eden (b. 1985)
                - (29, 7) Elvyn Eden (b. 1954)
          - Robert Henley (1831–1910)
            - Charles Henley (1869–1945)
              - Robert Henley (1917–1991)
                - (30, 8) Robert Henley (b. 1942)
                  - (31, 9) Robert Henley (b. 1973)
                  - (32, 10) Richard Henley (b. 1989)
                    - (33, 11) Oscar Henley (b. 2022)
                - (34, 12) Timothy Henley (b. 1945)
                - (35, 13) Christopher Henley (b. 1953)
                - (36, 14) Jonathan Henley (b. 1956)
        - The Hon. William Eden (1792–1859)
