= Eden baronets of Maryland (1776) =

Baronetcy

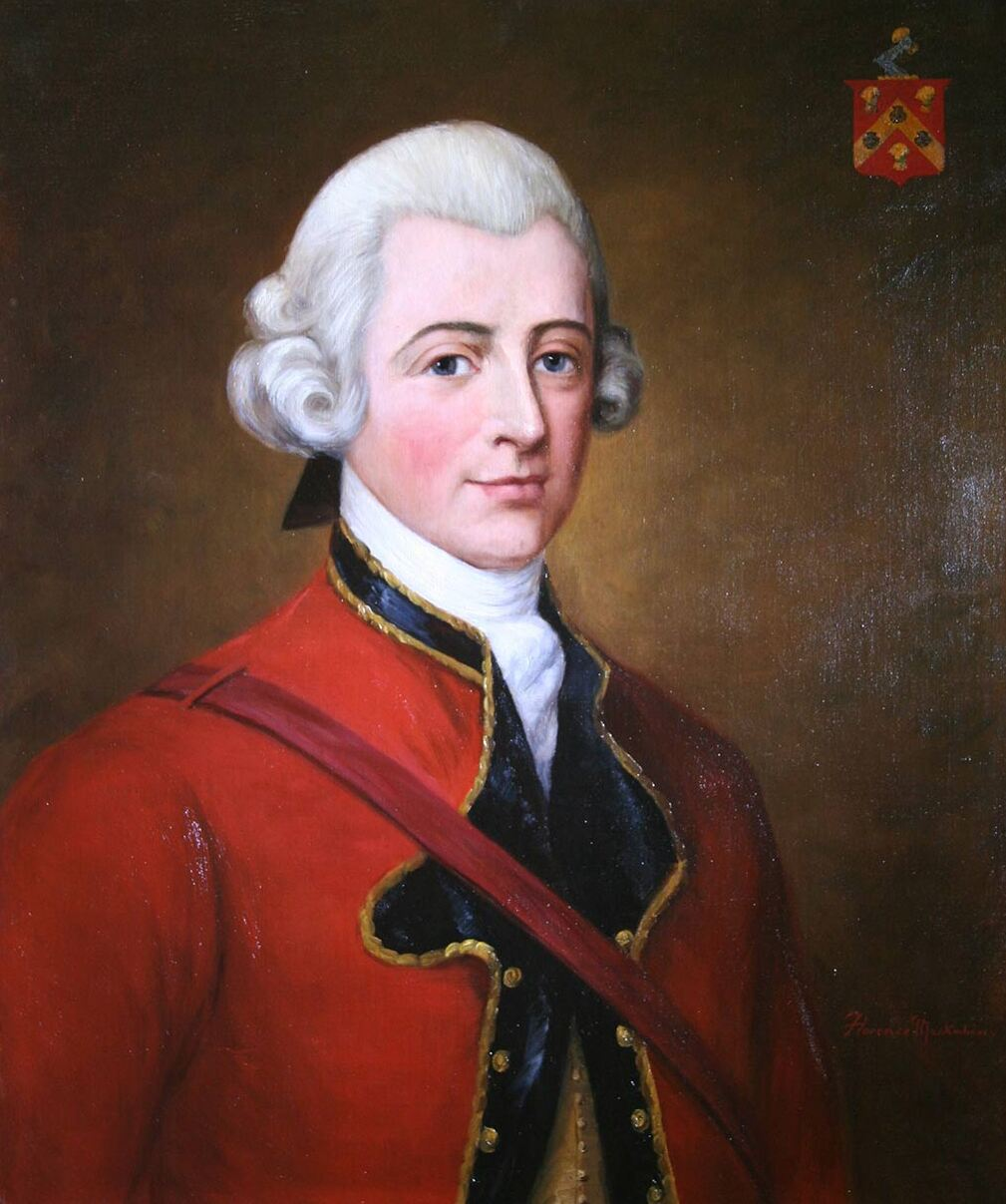
Sir Robert Eden, 1st Baronet, of Maryland

The Eden baronetcy, of Maryland in British North America, was created in the Baronetage of Great Britain on 19 October 1776 for Robert Eden, the last Governor of Maryland under British rule. He was the second son of the 3rd Baronet of the first creation. The escutcheon, before the titles were united, was that of the first creation with a crescent for difference.

The 3rd Baronet was killed at the Battle of New Orleans in 1814. The 4th Baronet, his cousin, succeeded as 6th Baronet of West Auckland in 1844.

== Eden baronets, of Maryland (1776) ==
- Sir Robert Eden, 1st Baronet (1741–1784)
- Sir Frederick Morton Eden, 2nd Baronet (1766–1809)
- Sir Frederick Eden, 3rd Baronet (c. 1798–1814), killed in action.
- Sir William Eden, 6th and 4th Baronet (1803–1873), who succeeded as 6th Baronet of the first creation in 1844.

See Eden baronets of West Auckland (1672) for further succession.

== Extended family ==
- Robert Eden, third son of the 2nd Baronet, was Primus of Scotland and Bishop of Moray, Ross and Caithness.
- George Morton Eden, fourth son of the 2nd Baronet, was a lieutenant-general in the British Army.
- Charles Eden (1808–1878), fifth son of the 2nd Baronet, was a vice-admiral in the Royal Navy.

== Family tree ==
Eden family tree, including the Eden baronets, Barons Auckland, Barons Henley, and Earls of Northington

Baron Henley, of Grainge, 1760; Earl of Northington, 1764
Robert Eden; 1717–1755; 3rd Baronet of West Auckland	Robert Henley; 1708–1772; 1st Earl of Northington, etc.
Eden baronets of Maryland, 1776	Baron Auckland (Ire), 1789; Baron Auckland (GB), 1793	Baron Henley, of Chardstock (2nd creation) 1799
John Eden; 1740–1812; 4th Baronet of West Auckland	Robert Eden; 1741–1784; 1st Baronet of Maryland	William Eden; 1744–1814; 1st Baron Auckland	Morton Eden; 1752–1830; 1st Baron Henley	Elizabeth Henley d. 1821	Robert Henley; 1747–1786; 2nd Earl of Northington, etc.
Earldom of Northington and Barony Henley (1st creations) extinct, 1786
Robert Johnson-Eden; 1774–1844; 5th Baronet of West Auckland	Frederick Morton Eden; 1766–1809; 2nd Baronet of Maryland
Earl of Auckland and Baron Eden, 1839
Frederick Eden c. 1794–1814; 3rd Baronet of Maryland	William Eden; 1803–1873; 6th Baronet of West Auckland, 4th Baronet of Maryland	Bishop Robert Eden; 1804–1886 Lt. Gen. George Morton Eden; 1806–1862 Adm. Charles Eden; 1808–1878	William Eden; 1782–1810	George Eden; 1784–1849; 1st Earl of Auckland, etc., 2nd Baron Auckland	Henry Eden; 1786–1794 George Eden; 1791–1795 Morton Eden; 1795–1821	Robert John Eden; 1799–1870; 3rd Baron Auckland	Frederick Eden; 1784–1823	Robert Eden; 1789–1841; 2nd Baron Henley
Eden barony and earldom extinct, 1849
Baron Northington of Watford in the County of Northampton, 1885 (2nd creation)
William George Eden; 1829–1890; 4th Baron Auckland	Anthony Henley Henley; 1825–1898; 3rd Baron Henley, 1st Baron Northington
William Morton Eden; 1849–1915; 7th Baronet of West Auckland, 5th Baronet of Maryland	William Morton Eden; 1859–1917; 5th Baron Auckland	George Eden; 1861–1924	Frederick Henley; 1849–1923; 4th Baron Henley, 2nd Baron Northington	Anthony Earnest Henley; 1858–1925; 5th Baron Henley, 3rd Baron Northington	Francis Robert Eden; 1877–1962; 6th Baron Henley, 4th Baron Northington
Earl of Avon and Viscount Eden, 1961
Timothy Calvert Eden; 1893–1963; 8th Baronet of West Auckland, 6th Baronet of Maryland	Robert Anthony Eden; 1897–1977; 1st Earl of Avon, etc.	Lt. William Eden; 1892–1915	Frederick Colvin George Eden; 1895–1941; 6th Baron Auckland	Geoffrey Morton Eden; 1891–1955; 7th Baron Auckland	Terence Eden; 1892–1957; 8th Baron Auckland	Michael Francis Eden; 1914–1977; 7th Baron Henley, 5th Baron Northington
Baron Eden of Winton, 1983
John Benedict Eden; 1925–2020; 9th Baronet of West Auckland, 7th Baronet of Maryland	Nicholas Eden; 1930–1985; 2nd Earl of Avon, etc.	Ian George Eden; 1926–1997; 9th Baron Auckland	Ronald Eden; 1931–2006
Barony Eden extinct, 1985	Earldom of Avon and Viscounty Eden extinct, 1985
Robert Frederick Calvert Eden b. 1964; 10th Baronet of West Auckland, 8th Baronet of Maryland	Robert Ian Burnard Eden b. 1962; 10th Baron Auckland	Henry Vane Eden b. 1958	Oliver Michael Robert Eden b. 1953; 8th Baron Henley, 6th Baron Northington
Harry Eden; 1989–1989	Oliver Eden b. 1990	John Michael Oliver Eden b. 1988

== Notes ==
Baronetage of Great Britain
Preceded by Baker baronets	Eden baronets of Maryland; 1 October 1776	Succeeded by Douglas baronets
