= Baron Auckland =

Barony in the Peerage of Great Britain

Barony Auckland
- Blazon Arms: Gules on a chevron argent between three garbs or banded Vert as many escallops sable. Crest: A dexter arm embowed in armour couped at the shoulder proper and grasping a garb or banded vert. Supporters: Dexter, a horse guardant argent, charged on the shoulder with a fleur-de-lis or; Sinister, a horse argent, charged on the shoulder with a tower or. Motto: Si Sit Prudentia (If there be but prudence)
- Creation date: 1789 (Ireland), 1793 (Great Britain)
- Created by: King George III
- Peerage: Peerage of Ireland; Peerage of the United Kingdom
- First holder: William Eden
- Present holder: Robert Eden, 10th Baron
- Heir presumptive: Henry Vane Eden
- Remainder to: the 1st Barons's heirs male lawfully begotten
- Subsidiary titles: None
- Status: Extant
- Motto: SI SIT PRUDENTIA (If there be but prudence)

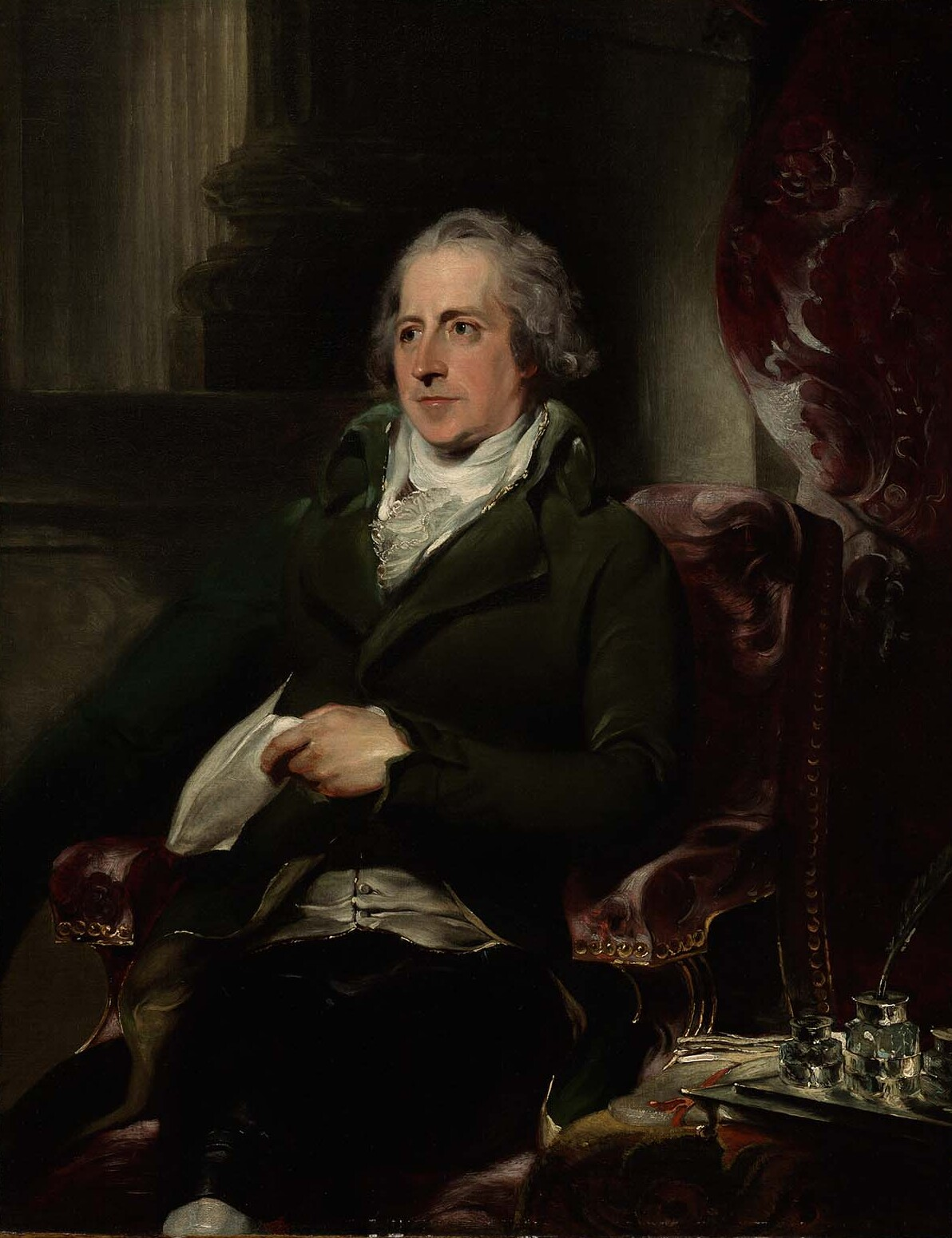
William Eden, 1st Baron Auckland

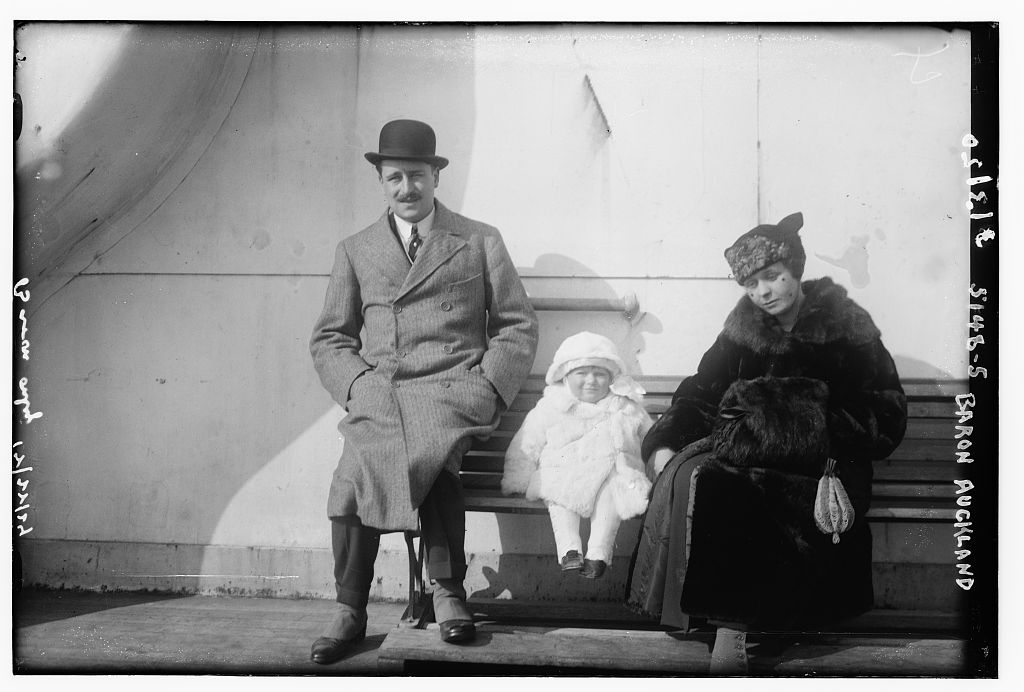
Frederick Eden, 6th Baron Auckland

Baron Auckland is a title in both the Peerage of Ireland and the Peerage of Great Britain. The first creation came in 1789 when the prominent politician and financial expert William Eden was made Baron Auckland in the Peerage of Ireland. In 1793, he was created Baron Auckland, of West Auckland in the County of Durham, in the Peerage of Great Britain. Eden notably served as Chief Secretary for Ireland, Ambassador to Spain, and President of the Board of Trade. His second son, the second Baron, was also a politician and served as Governor-General of India. In 1839 he was created Baron Eden, of Norwood in the County of Surrey, and Earl of Auckland, in the Peerage of the United Kingdom. However, he never married, and the barony of Eden and the earldom became extinct on his death while he was succeeded in the baronies of Auckland by his younger brother, the third Baron. He was Bishop of both Sodor and Man and Bath and Wells. The titles descended from father to son until the death of the sixth Baron in 1941. He was succeeded by his cousin, the seventh Baron. He was the son of George Eden, third son of the fourth Baron. He was succeeded by his younger brother, the eighth Baron. As of 2013, the titles are held by the latter's grandson, the tenth Baron, who succeeded his father in 1997.

The Barons Auckland are members of the prominent Eden family. The first Baron was the third son of Sir Robert Eden, 3rd Baronet, of West Auckland. His younger brother was Morton Eden, 1st Baron Henley, while his elder brother was Sir Robert Eden, 1st Baronet, of Maryland. The latter was the great-great-grandfather of Prime Minister Anthony Eden, 1st Earl of Avon, and the great-great-great-grandfather of John Eden, Baron Eden of Winton. The present Baron Auckland is also in remainder to the Eden Baronetcy of West Auckland, a title held by his kinsman the Lord Eden of Winton. William Eden, the eldest son of the first Baron, was Member of Parliament for Woodstock. Sir Ashley Eden, third son of the third Baron, was an official and diplomat in British India.

The city of Auckland in New Zealand was named after the first Earl of Auckland, the patron of the city's founder, William Hobson. Several Auckland landmarks, including the hill and suburb Mount Eden and the sports ground Eden Park, are named directly or indirectly after the family.

== Baron Auckland (1789, 1793) ==
- William Eden, 1st Baron Auckland (1744–1814)
- George Eden, 2nd Baron Auckland (1784–1849) (created Baron Eden and Earl of Auckland in 1839)

=== Earl of Auckland (1839) ===
- George Eden, 1st Earl of Auckland (1784–1849)

=== Baron Auckland (1789, 1793; reverted) ===
- Robert John Eden, 3rd Baron Auckland (1799–1870)
- William George Eden, 4th Baron Auckland (1829–1890)
- William Morton Eden, 5th Baron Auckland (1859–1917)
- Frederick Colvin George Eden, 6th Baron Auckland (1895–1941)
- Geoffrey Morton Eden, 7th Baron Auckland (1891–1955)
- Terence Eden, 8th Baron Auckland (1892–1957)
- Ian George Eden, 9th Baron Auckland (1926–1997)
- Robert Ian Burnard Eden, 10th Baron Auckland (born 1962)

The heir presumptive is the present holder's first cousin, Henry Vane Eden (born 1958).
The heir presumptive's heir apparent is his son, Oliver Eden (born 1990).

== Family tree ==
Eden family tree, including the Eden baronets, Barons Auckland, Barons Henley, and Earls of Northington

Eden baronets, of West Auckland, 1672
Robert Eden c. 1644–1720; 1st Baronet of West Auckland
John Eden; 1677–1728; 2nd Baronet of West Auckland
Baron Henley, of Grainge, 1760; Earl of Northington, 1764
Robert Eden; 1717–1755; 3rd Baronet of West Auckland	Robert Henley; 1708–1772; 1st Earl of Northington, etc.
Eden baronets of Maryland, 1776	Baron Auckland (Ire), 1789; Baron Auckland (GB), 1793	Baron Henley, of Chardstock (2nd creation) 1799
John Eden; 1740–1812; 4th Baronet of West Auckland	Robert Eden; 1741–1784; 1st Baronet of Maryland	William Eden; 1744–1814; 1st Baron Auckland	Morton Eden; 1752–1830; 1st Baron Henley	Elizabeth Henley d. 1821	Robert Henley; 1747–1786; 2nd Earl of Northington, etc.
Earldom of Northington and Barony Henley (1st creations) extinct, 1786
Robert Johnson-Eden; 1774–1844; 5th Baronet of West Auckland	Frederick Morton Eden; 1766–1809; 2nd Baronet of Maryland
Earl of Auckland and Baron Eden, 1839
Frederick Eden c. 1794–1814; 3rd Baronet of Maryland	William Eden; 1803–1873; 6th Baronet of West Auckland, 4th Baronet of Maryland	also: Bishop Robert Eden; 1804–1886 Lt. Gen. George Morton Eden; 1806–1862 Adm. Charles Eden; 1808–1878	George Eden; 1784–1849; 1st Earl of Auckland, etc., 2nd Baron Auckland	also: Eleanor Agnes Eden; 1777–1851 William Eden; 1782–1810 Henry Eden; 1786–1794 Emily Eden; 1797–1869	Robert John Eden; 1799–1870; 3rd Baron Auckland	Frederick Eden; 1784–1823	Robert Eden; 1789–1841; 2nd Baron Henley
Eden barony and earldom extinct, 1849
Baron Northington of Watford in the County of Northampton, 1885 (2nd creation)
William George Eden; 1829–1890; 4th Baron Auckland	Anthony Henley Henley; 1825–1898; 3rd Baron Henley, 1st Baron Northington
William Morton Eden; 1849–1915; 7th Baronet of West Auckland, 5th Baronet of Maryland	Edith Eden	William Morton Eden; 1859–1917; 5th Baron Auckland	George Eden; 1861–1924	Frederick Henley; 1849–1923; 4th Baron Henley, 2nd Baron Northington	Anthony Earnest Henley; 1858–1925; 5th Baron Henley, 3rd Baron Northington	Francis Robert Eden; 1877–1962; 6th Baron Henley, 4th Baron Northington
Earl of Avon and Viscount Eden, 1961
Timothy Calvert Eden; 1893–1963; 8th Baronet of West Auckland, 6th Baronet of Maryland	Robert Anthony Eden; 1897–1977; 1st Earl of Avon, etc.	Lt. William Eden; 1892–1915	Frederick Colvin George Eden; 1895–1941; 6th Baron Auckland	Geoffrey Morton Eden; 1891–1955; 7th Baron Auckland	Terence Eden; 1892–1957; 8th Baron Auckland	Michael Francis Eden; 1914–1977; 7th Baron Henley, 5th Baron Northington
Baron Eden of Winton, 1983
John Benedict Eden; 1925–2020; 9th Baronet of West Auckland, 7th Baronet of Maryland	Nicholas Eden; 1930–1985; 2nd Earl of Avon, etc.	Ian George Eden; 1926–1997; 9th Baron Auckland	Ronald Eden; 1931–2006
Barony Eden extinct, 1985	Earldom of Avon and Viscounty Eden extinct, 1985
Robert Frederick Calvert Eden b. 1964; 10th Baronet of West Auckland, 8th Baronet of Maryland	Robert Ian Burnard Eden b. 1962; 10th Baron Auckland	Henry Vane Eden b. 1958	Oliver Michael Robert Eden b. 1953; 8th Baron Henley, 6th Baron Northington
Harry Eden; 1989–1989	Oliver Eden b. 1990	John Michael Oliver Eden b. 1988

== See also ==
- Earl of Avon
- Baron Henley
- Eden baronets

== Sources ==
- Hesilrige, Arthur G. M. (1921). Debrett's Peerage and Titles of courtesy. London: London: Dean & son, limited. p. 78.
- Kidd, Charles, Williamson, David (editors). Debrett's Peerage and Baronetage (1990 edition). New York: St Martin's Press, 1990,
- Leigh Rayment's Peerage Pages
