= Eden baronets =

Set index for Eden baronets

There have been two baronetcies created for the surname Eden, one in the Baronetage of England and the other in the Baronetage of Great Britain. As of 2026 the two titles, united in 1844, are extant.

- Eden baronets of West Auckland (1672)
- Eden baronets of Maryland (1776)

Eden family tree, including the Eden baronets, Barons Auckland, Barons Henley, and Earls of Northington

Baron Henley, of Grainge, 1760; Earl of Northington, 1764
Robert Eden; 1717–1755; 3rd Baronet of West Auckland | Robert Henley; 1708–1772; 1st Earl of Northington, etc.
Eden baronets of Maryland, 1776 | Baron Auckland (Ire), 1789; Baron Auckland (GB), 1793 | Baron Henley, of Chardstock (2nd creation) 1799
John Eden; 1740–1812; 4th Baronet of West Auckland | Robert Eden; 1741–1784; 1st Baronet of Maryland | William Eden; 1744–1814; 1st Baron Auckland | Morton Eden; 1752–1830; 1st Baron Henley | Elizabeth Henley d. 1821 | Robert Henley; 1747–1786; 2nd Earl of Northington, etc.
Earldom of Northington and Barony Henley (1st creations) extinct, 1786
Robert Johnson-Eden; 1774–1844; 5th Baronet of West Auckland | Frederick Morton Eden; 1766–1809; 2nd Baronet of Maryland
Earl of Auckland and Baron Eden, 1839
Frederick Eden c. 1794–1814; 3rd Baronet of Maryland | William Eden; 1803–1873; 6th Baronet of West Auckland, 4th Baronet of Maryland | Bishop Robert Eden; 1804–1886 Lt. Gen. George Morton Eden; 1806–1862 Adm. Charles Eden; 1808–1878 | William Eden; 1782–1810 | George Eden; 1784–1849; 1st Earl of Auckland, etc., 2nd Baron Auckland | Henry Eden; 1786–1794 George Eden; 1791–1795 Morton Eden; 1795–1821 | Robert John Eden; 1799–1870; 3rd Baron Auckland | Frederick Eden; 1784–1823 | Robert Eden; 1789–1841; 2nd Baron Henley
Eden barony and earldom extinct, 1849
Baron Northington of Watford in the County of Northampton, 1885 (2nd creation)
William George Eden; 1829–1890; 4th Baron Auckland | Anthony Henley Henley; 1825–1898; 3rd Baron Henley, 1st Baron Northington
William Morton Eden; 1849–1915; 7th Baronet of West Auckland, 5th Baronet of Maryland | William Morton Eden; 1859–1917; 5th Baron Auckland | George Eden; 1861–1924 | Frederick Henley; 1849–1923; 4th Baron Henley, 2nd Baron Northington | Anthony Earnest Henley; 1858–1925; 5th Baron Henley, 3rd Baron Northington | Francis Robert Eden; 1877–1962; 6th Baron Henley, 4th Baron Northington
Earl of Avon and Viscount Eden, 1961
Timothy Calvert Eden; 1893–1963; 8th Baronet of West Auckland, 6th Baronet of Maryland | Robert Anthony Eden; 1897–1977; 1st Earl of Avon, etc. | Lt. William Eden; 1892–1915 | Frederick Colvin George Eden; 1895–1941; 6th Baron Auckland | Geoffrey Morton Eden; 1891–1955; 7th Baron Auckland | Terence Eden; 1892–1957; 8th Baron Auckland | Michael Francis Eden; 1914–1977; 7th Baron Henley, 5th Baron Northington
Baron Eden of Winton, 1983
John Benedict Eden; 1925–2020; 9th Baronet of West Auckland, 7th Baronet of Maryland | Nicholas Eden; 1930–1985; 2nd Earl of Avon, etc. | Ian George Eden; 1926–1997; 9th Baron Auckland | Ronald Eden; 1931–2006
Barony Eden extinct, 1985 | Earldom of Avon and Viscounty Eden extinct, 1985
Robert Frederick Calvert Eden b. 1964; 10th Baronet of West Auckland, 8th Baronet of Maryland | Robert Ian Burnard Eden b. 1962; 10th Baron Auckland | Henry Vane Eden b. 1958 | Oliver Michael Robert Eden b. 1953; 8th Baron Henley, 6th Baron Northington
Harry Eden; 1989–1989 | Oliver Eden b. 1990 | John Michael Oliver Eden b. 1988

== See also ==
- Baron Auckland
- Baron Henley
- Earl of Avon
