= Earl of Avon =

Extinct earldom in the Peerage of the United Kingdom

Arms of Eden

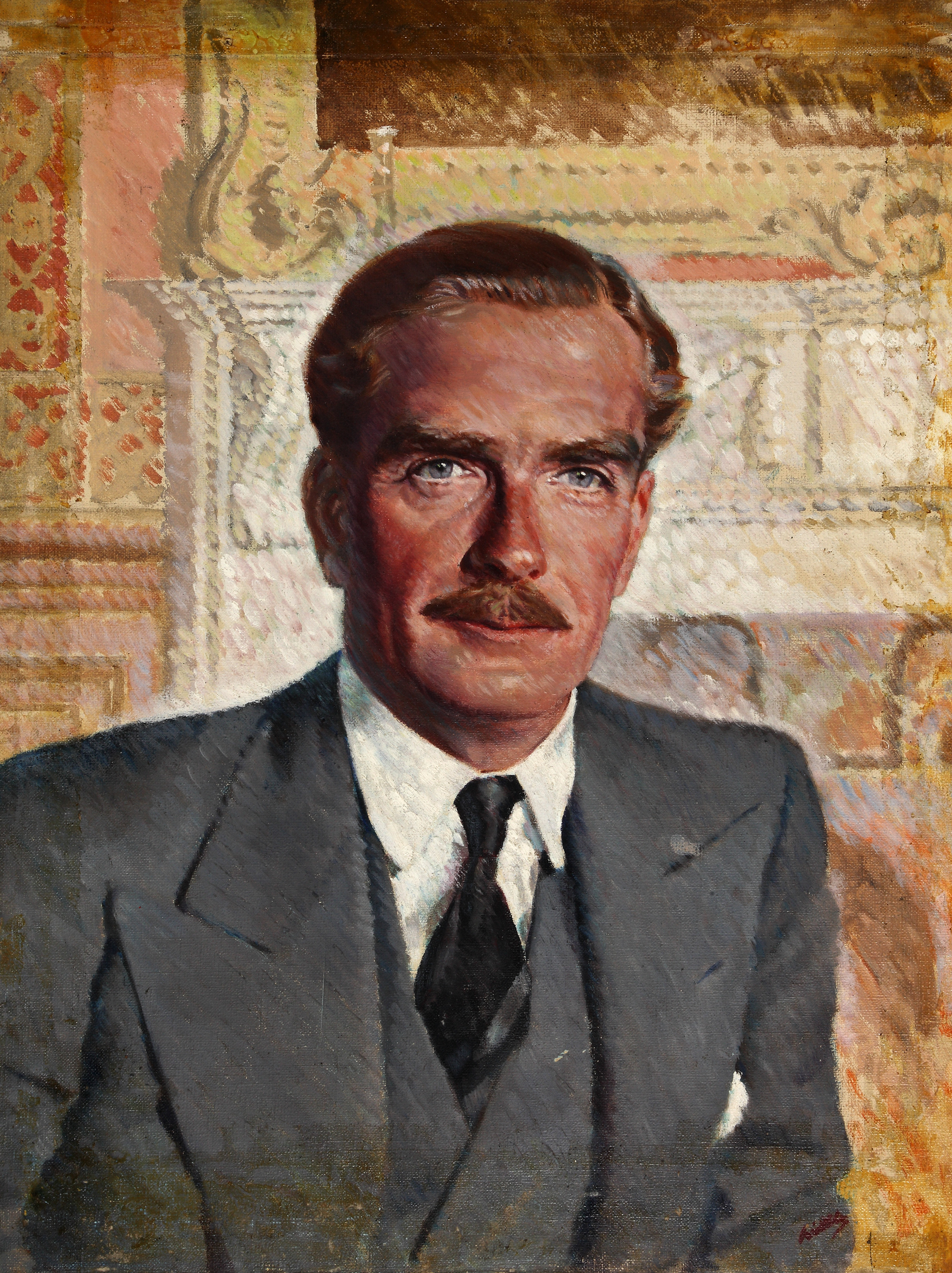
Anthony Eden, 1st Earl of Avon

Earl of Avon was a title in the Peerage of the United Kingdom. It was created in 1961 for the former Prime Minister Sir Anthony Eden, together with the subsidiary title Viscount Eden, of Royal Leamington Spa in the County of Warwick, also in the Peerage of the United Kingdom. The titles became extinct on the death of his only surviving son Nicholas, the second Earl, in 1985.

Eden was a member of the prominent Eden family. He was the third son of Sir William Eden, 7th Baronet, of West Auckland, and 5th Baronet, of Maryland. Eden's nephew was fellow Conservative politician John Benedict Eden, Baron Eden of Winton. Eden's great-great-grandfather Sir Robert Eden, 1st Baronet, of Maryland, was the elder brother of William Eden, 1st Baron Auckland, and Morton Eden, 1st Baron Henley.

== Earls of Avon (1961) ==
- Anthony Eden, 1st Earl of Avon (1897–1977)
- Nicholas Eden, 2nd Earl of Avon (1930–1985)

Eden family tree, including the Eden baronets, Barons Auckland, Barons Henley, and Earls of Northington

Baron Henley, of Grainge, 1760; Earl of Northington, 1764
Robert Eden; 1717–1755; 3rd Baronet of West Auckland	Robert Henley; 1708–1772; 1st Earl of Northington, etc.
Eden baronets of Maryland, 1776	Baron Auckland (Ire), 1789; Baron Auckland (GB), 1793	Baron Henley, of Chardstock (2nd creation) 1799
John Eden; 1740–1812; 4th Baronet of West Auckland	Robert Eden; 1741–1784; 1st Baronet of Maryland	William Eden; 1744–1814; 1st Baron Auckland	Morton Eden; 1752–1830; 1st Baron Henley	Elizabeth Henley d. 1821	Robert Henley; 1747–1786; 2nd Earl of Northington, etc.
Earldom of Northington and Barony Henley (1st creations) extinct, 1786
Robert Johnson-Eden; 1774–1844; 5th Baronet of West Auckland	Frederick Morton Eden; 1766–1809; 2nd Baronet of Maryland
Earl of Auckland and Baron Eden, 1839
Frederick Eden c. 1794–1814; 3rd Baronet of Maryland	William Eden; 1803–1873; 6th Baronet of West Auckland, 4th Baronet of Maryland	Bishop Robert Eden; 1804–1886 Lt. Gen. George Morton Eden; 1806–1862 Adm. Charles Eden; 1808–1878	William Eden; 1782–1810	George Eden; 1784–1849; 1st Earl of Auckland, etc., 2nd Baron Auckland	Henry Eden; 1786–1794 George Eden; 1791–1795 Morton Eden; 1795–1821	Robert John Eden; 1799–1870; 3rd Baron Auckland	Frederick Eden; 1784–1823	Robert Eden; 1789–1841; 2nd Baron Henley
Eden barony and earldom extinct, 1849
Baron Northington of Watford in the County of Northampton, 1885 (2nd creation)
William George Eden; 1829–1890; 4th Baron Auckland	Anthony Henley Henley; 1825–1898; 3rd Baron Henley, 1st Baron Northington
William Morton Eden; 1849–1915; 7th Baronet of West Auckland, 5th Baronet of Maryland	William Morton Eden; 1859–1917; 5th Baron Auckland	George Eden; 1861–1924	Frederick Henley; 1849–1923; 4th Baron Henley, 2nd Baron Northington	Anthony Earnest Henley; 1858–1925; 5th Baron Henley, 3rd Baron Northington	Francis Robert Eden; 1877–1962; 6th Baron Henley, 4th Baron Northington
Earl of Avon and Viscount Eden, 1961
Timothy Calvert Eden; 1893–1963; 8th Baronet of West Auckland, 6th Baronet of Maryland	Robert Anthony Eden; 1897–1977; 1st Earl of Avon, etc.	Lt. William Eden; 1892–1915	Frederick Colvin George Eden; 1895–1941; 6th Baron Auckland	Geoffrey Morton Eden; 1891–1955; 7th Baron Auckland	Terence Eden; 1892–1957; 8th Baron Auckland	Michael Francis Eden; 1914–1977; 7th Baron Henley, 5th Baron Northington
Baron Eden of Winton, 1983
John Benedict Eden; 1925–2020; 9th Baronet of West Auckland, 7th Baronet of Maryland	Nicholas Eden; 1930–1985; 2nd Earl of Avon, etc.	Ian George Eden; 1926–1997; 9th Baron Auckland	Ronald Eden; 1931–2006
Barony Eden extinct, 1985	Earldom of Avon and Viscounty Eden extinct, 1985
Robert Frederick Calvert Eden b. 1964; 10th Baronet of West Auckland, 8th Baronet of Maryland	Robert Ian Burnard Eden b. 1962; 10th Baron Auckland	Henry Vane Eden b. 1958	Oliver Michael Robert Eden b. 1953; 8th Baron Henley, 6th Baron Northington
Harry Eden; 1989–1989	Oliver Eden b. 1990	John Michael Oliver Eden b. 1988

== Arms ==
Coat of arms of Eden, Earls of Avon
Crest A dexter arm embowed in armour couped at the shoulder proper and grasping a garb or banded vert. Escutcheon Gules on a chevron argent between three garbs or banded Vert as many escallops sable. Supporters Dexter, A leopard guardant or, resting the sinister hind paw on a garb or, banded vert; Sinister, A like leopard resting the dexter hind paw on a similar garb. Motto Si Sit Prudentia (If there be but prudence).

== See also ==
- Baron Auckland
- Baron Henley
- Eden baronets
