= Baron Henley =

Barony in the Peerage of Great Britain

- Blazon: Arms: Quarterly: 1st and 4th, Gules, on a chevron argent between three garbs or banded vert as many escallops sable (Eden); Azure, a lion rampant argent ducally crowned or a bordure of the second charged with eight torteaux (Henley).; Crests: A dexter arm in armour couped at the shoulder proper and grasping a garb or.; Supporters: Dexter: A lion argent semée of torteaux ducally crowned or having a plain collar or rimmed azure on the collar three escallops sable and pendant therefrom a shield or charged with an eagle displayed with two heads sable; Sinister: A stag argent semée of torteaux, attired or gorged with a plain collar or rimmed azure on the collar three escallops sable and pendant therefrom a shield or charged with an eagle displayed with one head also sable.
- Creation date: 9 November 1799
- Creation: Second
- Created by: King George III
- Peerage: Peerage of Ireland
- First holder: Morton Eden, 1st Baron Henley
- Present holder: Oliver Michael Robert Eden, 8th Baron Henley, 6th Baron Northington
- Heir apparent: Hon. John Michael Oliver Eden
- Subsidiary titles: Baron Northington
- Seat: Scaleby Castle
- Motto: SI SIT PRUDENTIA; If there be prudence

Arms of Henley: Azure, a lion rampant argent ducally crowned or a bordure of the second charged with eight torteaux. Quartering Bertie. Crest: A lion's head erased argent charged with hurts and ducally crowned or. Supporters: dexter: A lion argent semée of torteaux langued gules and ducally crowned or; sinister: A stag argent semée of torteaux attired and unguled or. motto: 'Sola et Unica Virtus ("Alone and unique is virtue")

Baron Henley is a title that has been created twice: first in the Peerage of Great Britain and then in the Peerage of Ireland. The first creation came in 1760 in favour of Sir Robert Henley, Lord High Chancellor of Great Britain, when he was created Lord Henley, Baron of Grainge, in the County of Southampton. In 1764 he was further honoured when he was made Earl of Northington. On the death of his son, the second Earl, both titles became extinct. Lady Elizabeth Henley, youngest daughter of the first Earl and co-heiress of the second Earl, married the diplomat Morton Eden. In 1799, the Henley title was revived when Eden was created Baron Henley, of Chardstock in the County of Dorset, in the Peerage of Ireland. Their son, the second Baron, assumed the surname of Henley in lieu of Eden and notably published a biography of his maternal grandfather. His son, the third Baron, sat as Liberal Member of Parliament for Northampton. In 1885 the Northington title was also revived when he was created Baron Northington, of Watford in the County of Northampton, in the Peerage of the United Kingdom. This title gave the Barons an automatic seat in the House of Lords. The fourth baron Frederick Henley was an educated man who served as JP in Northamptonshire and married Augusta, daughter of Herbert Langham, 12th Baronet.

His younger son, the sixth Baron, resumed the surname of Eden in 1925, the same year he succeeded his half-brother in the titles. As of 2019 the peerages are held by his grandson, the eighth Baron, who succeeded his father in 1977. He is a Conservative politician and served in the Conservative administrations of Margaret Thatcher, John Major and David Cameron, and was one of the ninety elected hereditary peers who remained in the House of Lords after the passing of the House of Lords Act 1999, until 2026.

The Barons Henley are members of the Eden family. The first Baron was the fifth son of Sir Robert Eden, 3rd Baronet, of West Auckland, and the younger brother of William Eden, 1st Baron Auckland. Their elder brother Sir Robert Eden, 1st Baronet, of Maryland (second son of the third Baronet of West Auckland), was a great-great-grandfather of Prime Minister Anthony Eden, 1st Earl of Avon, and a great-great-great-grandfather of the Conservative politician John Benedict Eden, Baron Eden of Winton.

The family seat is Scaleby Castle, near Carlisle, Cumbria.

== Baron Henley, first creation (1760) ==
- Robert Henley, 1st Baron Henley (1708–1772) (created Earl of Northington in 1764)

=== Earl of Northington (1764) ===
- Robert Henley, 1st Earl of Northington (1708–1772)
- Robert Henley, 2nd Earl of Northington (1747–1786)

== Baron Henley, second creation (1799) ==
- Morton Eden, 1st Baron Henley (1752–1830)
- Robert Henley Henley, 2nd Baron Henley (1789–1841)
- Anthony Henley Henley, 3rd Baron Henley (1825–1898) (created Baron Northington in 1885)
- Frederick Henley Henley, 4th Baron Henley, 2nd Baron Northington (1849–1923)
- Anthony Ernest Henley Henley, 5th Baron Henley, 3rd Baron Northington (1858–1925)
- Francis Robert Eden, 6th Baron Henley, 4th Baron Northington (1877–1962)
- Michael Francis Eden, 7th Baron Henley, 5th Baron Northington (1914–1977)
- Oliver Michael Robert Eden, 8th Baron Henley, 6th Baron Northington (born 1953)

The heir apparent is the present peer's son, the Hon. John Michael Oliver Eden (born 1988).

== Family tree ==
Eden family tree, including the Eden baronets, Barons Auckland, Barons Henley, and Earls of Northington

Eden baronets, of West Auckland, 1672
Robert Eden c. 1644–1720; 1st Baronet of West Auckland
John Eden; 1677–1728; 2nd Baronet of West Auckland
Baron Henley, of Grainge, 1760; Earl of Northington, 1764
Robert Eden; 1717–1755; 3rd Baronet of West Auckland	Robert Henley; 1708–1772; 1st Earl of Northington, etc.
Eden baronets of Maryland, 1776	Baron Auckland (Ire), 1789; Baron Auckland (GB), 1793	Baron Henley, of Chardstock (2nd creation) 1799
John Eden; 1740–1812; 4th Baronet of West Auckland	Robert Eden; 1741–1784; 1st Baronet of Maryland	William Eden; 1744–1814; 1st Baron Auckland	Morton Eden; 1752–1830; 1st Baron Henley	Elizabeth Henley d. 1821	Robert Henley; 1747–1786; 2nd Earl of Northington, etc.
Earldom of Northington and Barony Henley (1st creations) extinct, 1786
Robert Johnson-Eden; 1774–1844; 5th Baronet of West Auckland	Frederick Morton Eden; 1766–1809; 2nd Baronet of Maryland
Earl of Auckland and Baron Eden, 1839
Frederick Eden c. 1794–1814; 3rd Baronet of Maryland	William Eden; 1803–1873; 6th Baronet of West Auckland, 4th Baronet of Maryland	also: Bishop Robert Eden; 1804–1886 Lt. Gen. George Morton Eden; 1806–1862 Adm. Charles Eden; 1808–1878	George Eden; 1784–1849; 1st Earl of Auckland, etc., 2nd Baron Auckland	also: Eleanor Agnes Eden; 1777–1851 William Eden; 1782–1810 Henry Eden; 1786–1794 Emily Eden; 1797–1869	Robert John Eden; 1799–1870; 3rd Baron Auckland	Frederick Eden; 1784–1823	Robert Eden; 1789–1841; 2nd Baron Henley
Eden barony and earldom extinct, 1849
Baron Northington of Watford in the County of Northampton, 1885 (2nd creation)
William George Eden; 1829–1890; 4th Baron Auckland	Anthony Henley Henley; 1825–1898; 3rd Baron Henley, 1st Baron Northington
William Morton Eden; 1849–1915; 7th Baronet of West Auckland, 5th Baronet of Maryland	Edith Eden	William Morton Eden; 1859–1917; 5th Baron Auckland	George Eden; 1861–1924	Frederick Henley; 1849–1923; 4th Baron Henley, 2nd Baron Northington	Anthony Earnest Henley; 1858–1925; 5th Baron Henley, 3rd Baron Northington	Francis Robert Eden; 1877–1962; 6th Baron Henley, 4th Baron Northington
Earl of Avon and Viscount Eden, 1961
Timothy Calvert Eden; 1893–1963; 8th Baronet of West Auckland, 6th Baronet of Maryland	Robert Anthony Eden; 1897–1977; 1st Earl of Avon, etc.	Lt. William Eden; 1892–1915	Frederick Colvin George Eden; 1895–1941; 6th Baron Auckland	Geoffrey Morton Eden; 1891–1955; 7th Baron Auckland	Terence Eden; 1892–1957; 8th Baron Auckland	Michael Francis Eden; 1914–1977; 7th Baron Henley, 5th Baron Northington
Baron Eden of Winton, 1983
John Benedict Eden; 1925–2020; 9th Baronet of West Auckland, 7th Baronet of Maryland	Nicholas Eden; 1930–1985; 2nd Earl of Avon, etc.	Ian George Eden; 1926–1997; 9th Baron Auckland	Ronald Eden; 1931–2006
Barony Eden extinct, 1985	Earldom of Avon and Viscounty Eden extinct, 1985
Robert Frederick Calvert Eden b. 1964; 10th Baronet of West Auckland, 8th Baronet of Maryland	Robert Ian Burnard Eden b. 1962; 10th Baron Auckland	Henry Vane Eden b. 1958	Oliver Michael Robert Eden b. 1953; 8th Baron Henley, 6th Baron Northington
Harry Eden; 1989–1989	Oliver Eden b. 1990	John Michael Oliver Eden b. 1988

== See also ==
- Earl of Avon
- Baron Auckland
- Eden baronets
