= Sir William Eden, 7th Baronet =

English sportsman and artist (1849–1915)

Sir William Eden Bt JP DL
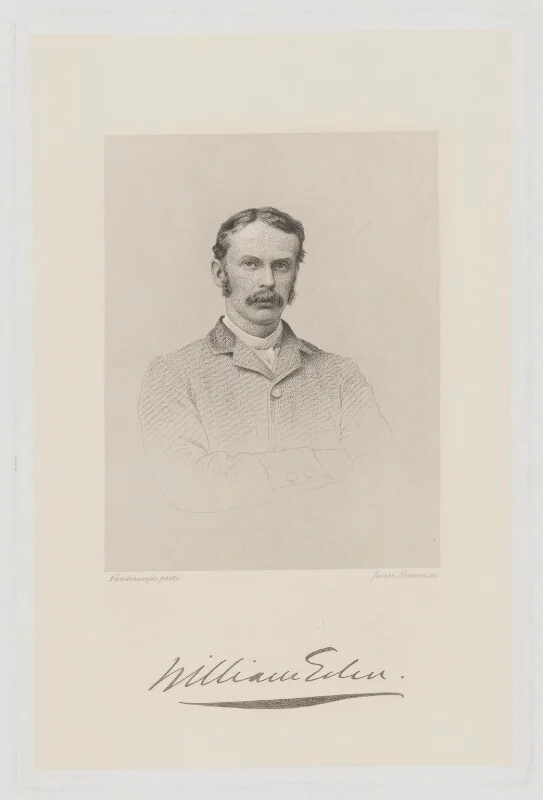
- Portrait of Sir William Eden by Joseph Brown

Personal details
- Born: William Morton Eden; 4 April 1849 Windlestone Hall, County Durham
- Died: 20 February 1915 (aged 65) London, England
- Resting place: Windlestone Hall Mausoleum, Rushyford; St. Helen's Churchyard, Saint Helen Auckland (after 1984)
- Spouse: Sybil Frances Grey (m. 1886)
- Relations: Robert Eden (uncle); George Morton Eden (uncle); Sir Charles Eden (uncle); Sir Frederick Eden, Bt (grandfather)
- Children: Elfrida Greville, Countess of Warwick; Jack Eden; Sir Timothy Eden, Bt; Anthony Eden, 1st Earl of Avon; Nicholas Eden
- Parent(s): Elfrida Iremonger Eden; Sir William Eden, Bt

Sir William Morton Eden, 7th and 5th Baronet JP DL (4 April 1849 – 20 February 1915) was a British politician and artist. His third son was Anthony Eden, 1st Earl of Avon, who served as Prime Minister of the United Kingdom.

== Early life ==
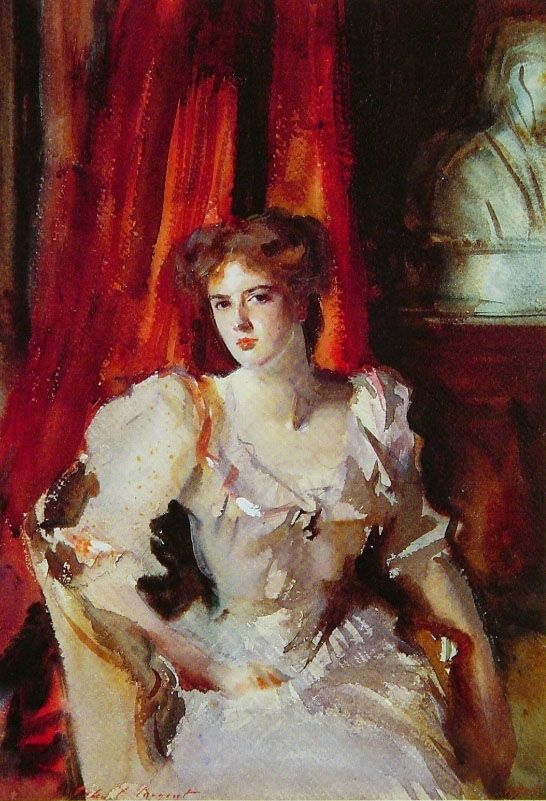
Portrait of his wife, Sybil Frances Grey, by John Singer Sargent, 1905.

William Morton Eden was born at Windlestone Hall, a Greek revival stately home, in County Durham on 4 April 1849. He was the second son of eleven children born to the former Elfrida Susanna Harriet Iremonger (1825–1885) and Sir William Eden, 4th Baronet (1803–1873), who was described as "a sober and pious man".

On his paternal side, he had many prominent relatives including aunt Caroline Eden Parker (wife of Vice-Admiral Hyde Parker), and uncles: the Rt. Rev. Robert Eden (Bishop of Moray, Ross and Caithness and Primus of the Scottish Episcopal Church), Lt. Gen. George Morton Eden, and Vice-Admiral Sir Charles Eden, Second Naval Lord. His maternal grandfather was William Iremonger, Esq. of Wherwell Priory.

=== Baronetage ===
After the death of his twenty-year-old uncle, Sir Frederick Eden became 3rd Baronet, in 1814, his then eleven-year-old father (the second son of scholar and social justice advocate Sir Frederick Eden, 2nd Baronet) became the 4th Baronet of Maryland. The baronetcy of Maryland had been created in 1776 for his great-grandfather, Sir Robert Eden, the last Royal Governor of Maryland. (Note: His great-grandfather, Sir Robert Eden, 1st Baronet, of Maryland (husband of Caroline Calvert), was the second son of Sir Robert Eden, 3rd Baronet, of West Auckland. His older brother was Sir John Eden, 4th Baronet and his younger brothers included William Eden, 1st Baron Auckland and Morton Eden, 1st Baron Henley.) In 1844, Sir William's father also succeeded as the 6th Baronet of West Auckland after the death of his first cousin once removed, Sir Robert Johnson-Eden, 5th Baronet. The baronetcy of West Auckland had been created in 1672 for Sir Robert Eden, MP for County Durham, whose father was a Royalist supporter during the English Civil War.

Upon his father's death on 21 October 1873, he became the 7th Baronet of West Auckland and 5th Baronet of Maryland as his elder brother died without male issue before him.

== Career ==
Sir William, who was described as an eccentric and often foul-tempered man, was a former colonel and local magistrate. He was also a talented watercolourist and exhibited regularly in London and Paris. He was also a collector of Impressionists, and owned a chalk drawing of Giovanni Battista Piazzetta, c. 1750-1754, which is today in the collection of the Morgan Library and Museum in New York City. He was a cornet in the 8th Hussars.

He was known as a daring traveler during his Grand Tour. He was a sportsman who served as Master of the Durham Hunt and gardener.

== Personal life ==
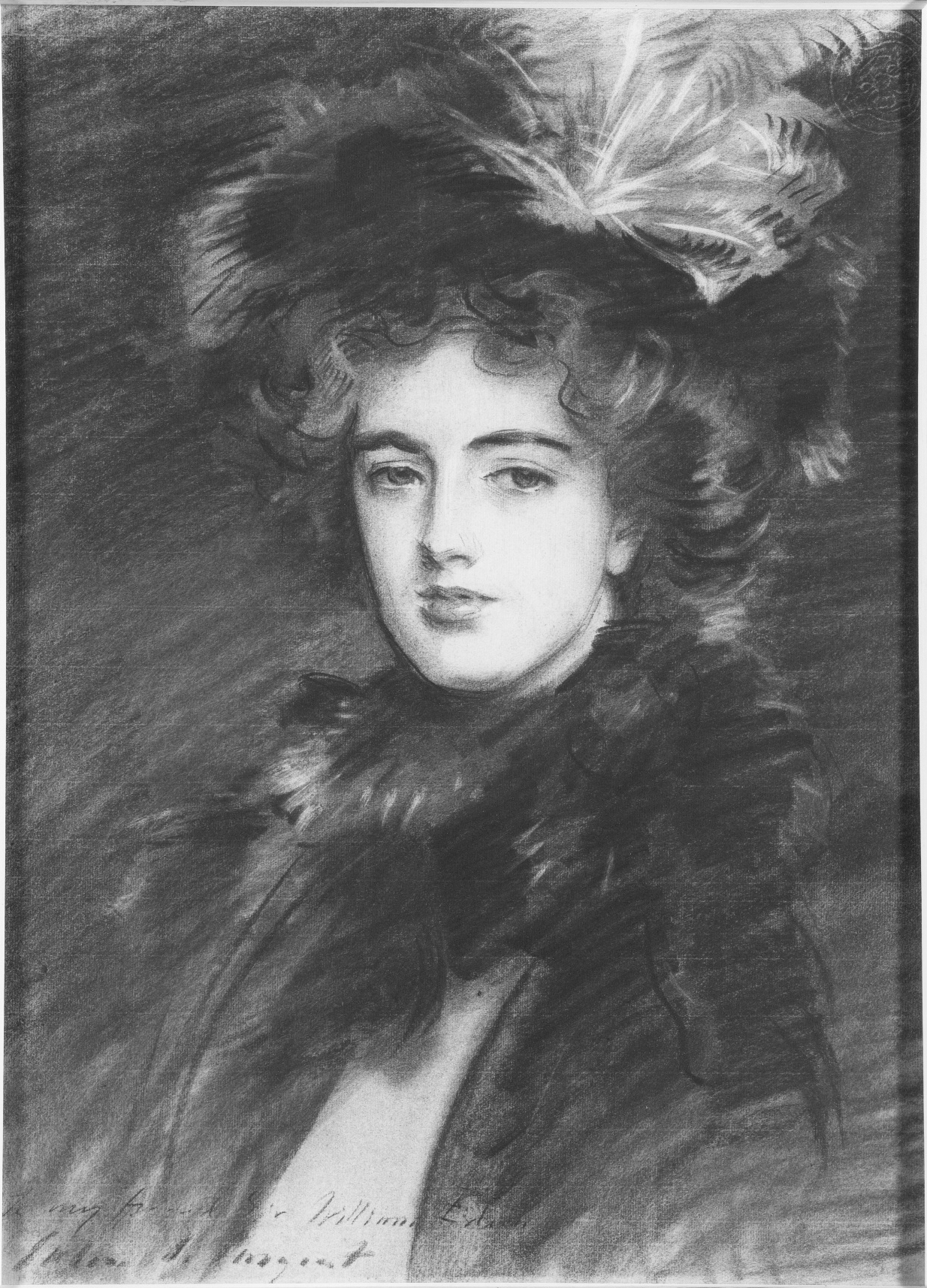
His only daughter, Marjorie Eden, Lady Brooke, later Countess of Warwick, by John Singer Sargent.

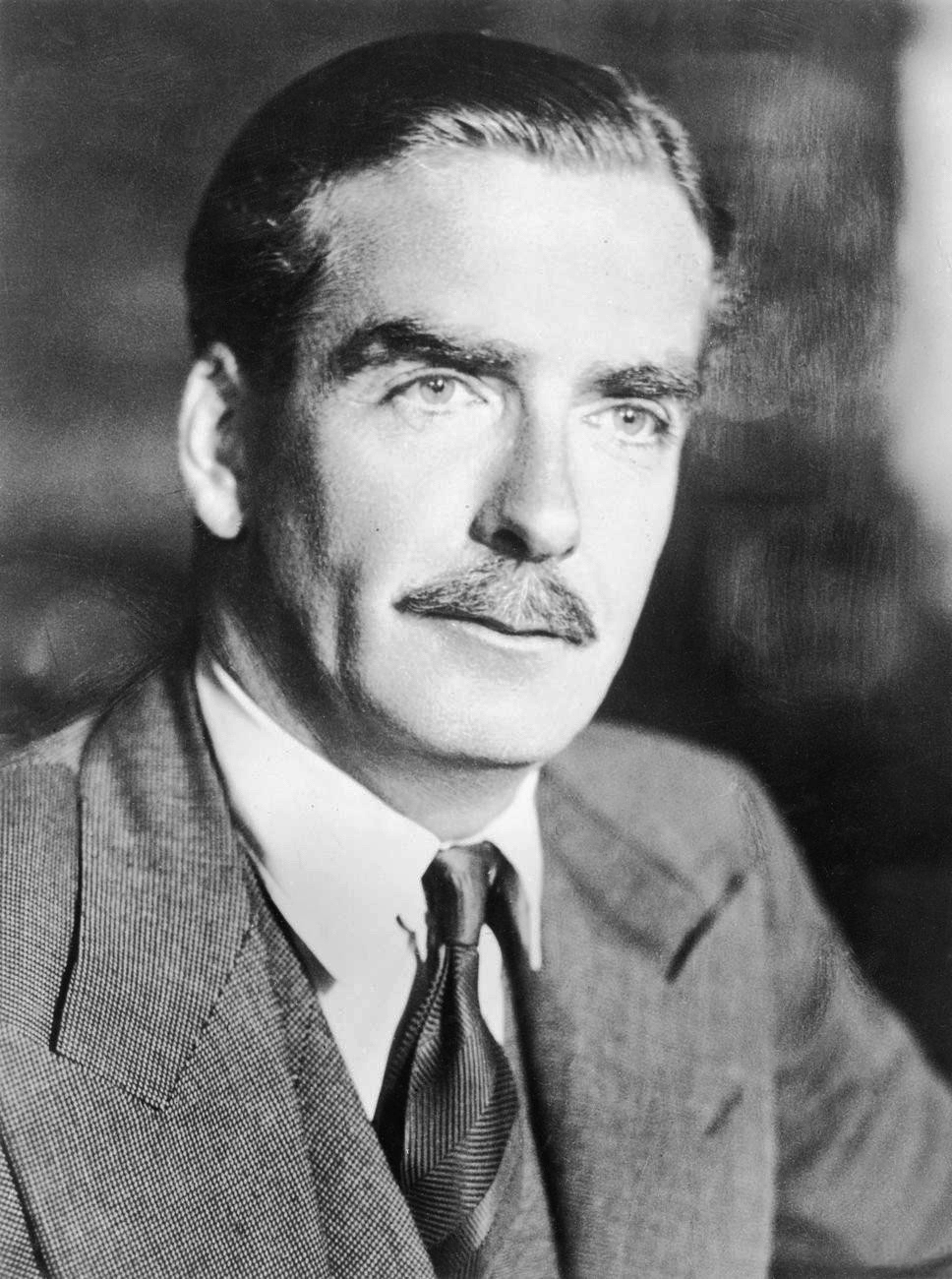
His third son, Anthony Eden, 1st Earl of Avon, who served as Prime Minister of the United Kingdom.

In 1886, he was married with Sybil Frances Grey (1867–1945), a daughter of Sir William Grey and a member of the famous Grey family of Northumberland. After their marriage, they lived at Windlestone Hall and his wife was a popular figure. However, her profligacy reportedly ruined the family fortunes. Together, they were the parents of five children who survived infancy:

- Elfrida Marjorie Eden (1887–1943), who married Leopold Greville, 6th Earl of Warwick, the son of Francis Greville, 5th Earl of Warwick and his wife Daisy Greville, Countess of Warwick.
- John William "Jack" Eden (1888–1914), who was killed in action in 1914.
- Sir Timothy Calvert Eden, 8th and 6th Baronet (1893–1963), who wrote a book about his father. His wife, Edith, founded Lady Eden's School in Kensington in 1947.
- Robert Anthony Eden (later 1st Earl of Avon) (1897–1977), who served as Prime Minister of the United Kingdom. He married twice, first in 1923 to Beatrice Beckett, daughter of Sir Gervase Beckett, Bt. After their 1950 divorce, he married Clarissa Spencer-Churchill, daughter of Jack Churchill and niece of Winston Churchill, in 1952.
- Nicholas William Eden (1900–1916), who was killed when the battlecruiser HMS Indefatigable blew up and sank at the Battle of Jutland in 1916. He was just sixteen years old and the vivid memory of being told of his death stayed with his brother Anthony for many years.

In 1892, he commissioned the American artist James McNeill Whistler to paint a portrait of his wife, Lady Eden. After the portrait was completed, Eden and Whistler fought over a fair price before the dispute ended up in the press, followed by a court proceeding brought by Eden in Paris in 1895. While Eden won the suit, Whistler destroyed the painting and in 1899 published Eden versus Whistler: The Baronet and the Butterfly. A Valentine with a Verdict "skewering the knight with his own pride".

Sir William died in London on 20 February 1915, and was succeeded by his eldest son Timothy, who sold Windlestone in 1936. Sir William was originally buried at Windlestone Hall Mausoleum, but was later reinterred at St. Helen's Churchyard in December 1984. Lady Eden died in 1945.

=== Descendants ===
Through his only surviving daughter, he was a grandfather of Charles Greville, 7th Earl of Warwick, the first British aristocrat to star in a Hollywood movie. Through his son Timothy, he was a grandfather of John Eden, Baron Eden of Winton, a Conservative Member of Parliament (MP) for Bournemouth West. Through his son Anthony, he was the grandfather of three, including Nicholas Eden, 2nd Earl of Avon.

== Notes ==
Baronetage of England
| Preceded by William Eden | Baronet (of West Auckland); 1873–1915 | Succeeded by Timothy Calvert Eden |
Baronetage of Great Britain
| Preceded by William Eden | Baronet (of Maryland); 1873–1915 | Succeeded by Timothy Calvert Eden |
