= Beatrice Beckett =

First wife of Anthony Eden

- Born: Beatrice Helen Beckett; 26 July 1905; Leeds, England
- Died: 29 June 1957 (aged 51); London, England
- Spouse: Anthony Eden (m. 1923; div. 1950)
- Children: 3, including Nicholas Eden, 2nd Earl of Avon
- Parent(s): Sir Gervase Beckett, Bt. Mabel Duncombe

Beatrice Helen Beckett (27 July 1905 – 29 June 1957) was the first wife of British politician Anthony Eden.

== Early life ==
She was the third daughter of Sir William Gervase Beckett, Bt. (1866–1937), a banker, Conservative MP, and chairman of the Yorkshire Post, and his wife, Mabel Theresa Duncombe (1877–1913). She was a relation of Daisy Greville, Countess of Warwick.

== Marriage ==
In 1923, Beckett married Anthony Eden, a Conservative politician, during a lull in his first election campaign. Their honeymoon was cut short after two days so her husband could campaign in Warwick. Soon afterwards, her husband entered Parliament representing Warwick and Leamington.

The couple had three sons:

- Simon Gascoigne Eden (1924–1945); a navigator in the RAF.
- Robert Eden (b. 1928; died same date); lived for fifteen minutes.
- Nicholas Eden, 2nd Earl of Avon (1930–1985); served from 1952 to 1953 as aide-de-camp to the Governor General of Canada.

Although her family press connections provided a useful boost to her husband's political career, by the early 1930s their marriage was in trouble due to Beatrice's dislike of politics and Eden's long hours and frequent absences at work. Eden eventually realised that his wife was having affairs with other men, but the two agreed to lead largely separate lives in private, "maintaining the fabric of their marriage until the strain became intolerable."

Her separation from Eden increased in 1941, when the family moved to Binderton House, near Chichester, Sussex, while Eden, to meet his wartime responsibilities, lived in a flat in the Foreign Office. The marriage was dealt its "final blow" when the couple's eldest son, Pilot Officer Simon Eden, predeceased his parents after being reported missing in action in Burma in June 1945. Beatrice spent the rest of the war in Paris, and in 1946 left Eden to live in the United States.

== Divorce ==
The marriage was dissolved in 1950 "on the grounds of his wife's desertion" after 27 years. The parting was amicable and the former couple remained friends.

Two years later, Beatrice's former husband (the first divorcé to become prime minister) married Clarissa Spencer-Churchill. The Church Times despaired that public approval for the second marriage "shows how far the climate of public opinion has changed for the worse, even since 1936."

Her lover, an "eminent American", reneged on his promise to marry her. She died in 1957 and is buried in the Beckett family plot at St Gregory's Minster, Kirkdale, North Yorkshire.
