= Caroline Eden =

First Lady of Maryland (c.1737–c.1803)

- Born: 1737; England
- Died: 1803 (aged 65–66); England
- Known for: Daughter of Charles Calvert, 5th Baron Baltimore and Mary Jenssen
- Children: Frederick

Caroline Eden (née Calvert; c. 1737 – c. 1803) was the daughter of Charles Calvert, 5th Baron Baltimore, and sister of Frederick Calvert, 6th Baron Baltimore. She married Sir Robert Eden, the last colonial Governor of Maryland, and was the mother of Sir Frederick Eden, 2nd Baronet.

== Early life ==
She was a daughter of Charles Calvert, 5th Baron Baltimore, and wife Mary Janssen. She had an older brother, Frederick Calvert, who succeeded his father to become the 6th and final Baron Baltimore, and a sister, Louisa Calvert. The Barons Baltimore were lords proprietors of the Maryland Colony of British America, granting them semi-feudal control of the province, including the right to collect taxes, establish courts and appoint the governor. She was baptised on 16 February 1737.

== American Revolution ==
On 26 April 1763 Caroline married Robert Eden. In 1769, Eden was appointed governor of Maryland; he would be the last colonial governor of the province.

Upon the death of her brother, Frederick Calvert, 6th Baron Baltimore, the colony of Maryland passed to Frederick's illegitimate son, Henry Harford. Despite his illegitimacy, the people of Maryland initially supported Harford and welcomed him as their new Lord Proprietor, even naming Harford County, Maryland after him in 1773. However, Governor Robert Eden disputed Harford's inheritance, and in 1774 tried to claim a part of the estate on behalf of his wife Caroline.

Before the English courts could rule on the case, the American Revolution broke out. Caroline Eden would however lose her claim - Harford succeeded in winning his father's inheritance; the rents from the Calvert estates in Britain were awarded to Harford by an act of Parliament - Lord Baltimore's Estate Act 1781 (21 Geo. 3. c. 35 Pr.). But in 1781 the new State of Maryland confiscated all of Henry Harford's estates and used their income to help finance the cash-strapped revolutionary government and its militia. After the war Harford made strenuous efforts to win compensation but without success.

== Legacy ==
In 1773 Caroline County, Maryland, was named in her honor. The county was formed from land belonging to Dorchester County and Queen Anne's County.
