= Robert Henley, 2nd Baron Henley =

British lawyer and Member of Parliament (1789–1841)

The Right Honourable The Lord Henley MP

Member of Parliament for Fowey
- In office 1826–1830
- Preceded by: Viscount Valletort; George Lucy
- Succeeded by: George Lucy; Lord Brudenell

Personal details
- Born: Robert Henley Eden; 3 September 1789 London, England
- Died: 3 February 1841 (aged 51) Whitehall, Westminster, London
- Party: Tory
- Spouse: Harriet Peel (m. 1823)
- Parents: Morton Eden, 1st Baron Henley (father); Lady Elizabeth Henley (mother)
- Relatives: Robert Henley (grandfather); Sir Robert Peel, 1st Bt. (father-in-law); Anthony, 3rd Baron Henley (son)
- Education: Eton College
- Alma mater: Christ Church, Oxford

Robert Henley Henley, 2nd Baron Henley MP (né Eden, 3 September 1789 – 3 February 1841), styled Hon. Robert Eden from 1799 to 1830, was a British lawyer, Member of Parliament, peer, and writer.

== Early life and education ==
Robert Henley was born Robert Eden at Lambeth Palace, London, the second son of diplomat Morton Eden, and his wife, Lady Elizabeth, youngest daughter of Lord Chancellor Robert Henley, 1st Earl of Northington (c. 1708–1772), and eventual heiress to her brother, Robert Henley, 2nd Earl of Northington.

Robert's other uncles were Sir John Eden, 4th Baronet; Sir Robert Eden, 1st Baronet, of Maryland; and William Eden, 1st Baron Auckland.

His father was knighted in 1791 and in 1799 raised to the peerage as Baron Henley, of Chardstock, in the Peerage of Ireland, in honour of his wife's family. Her brother Robert, 2nd Earl of Northington, died unmarried in 1786, and the earldom and subsidiary title of Baron Henley in the Peerage of Great Britain had become extinct.

Robert was educated at Eton College, and matriculated at Christ Church, Oxford, in 1807, graduating B.A. 1811, and M.A. 1814.

== Career and peerage ==
Henley served as a Master in Chancery from 1826 to 1840 and between 1826 and 1830 he also sat as member of parliament for Fowey.

In 1823, his elder brother, Hon. Frederick Eden, a barrister and heir to their father's barony, died unmarried at his chambers at Inner Temple. In 1830, he succeeded his father as second Baron Henley, but as this was an Irish peerage it did not entitle him to a seat in the House of Lords.

The following year, Lord Henley assumed by royal licence the surname of Henley in lieu of Eden. in commemoration of his maternal ancestors, and the same year he published a biography of his maternal grandfather, entitled Memoir of the Life of Robert Henley, Earl of Northington, Lord High Chancellor of Great Britain.

== Marriage and issue ==
Henley married Harriet Peel, daughter of Sir Robert Peel, 1st Baronet, and sister of Prime Minister Sir Robert Peel, 2nd Baronet, in 1823. They had four sons, two of whom survived to adulthood:

- Hon. Anthony Henley (Eden) (1825–1898), succeeded as third baron
- Robert Henley Eden (13–18 July 1826), died in infancy
- Hon. Rev. Robert Henley (7 March 1831 – 7 August 1910), Vicar of Putney, Surrey, married in 1852 Emily Louisa Aldridge
- Hon. Morton Henley (5 November – 1 December 1832), died in infancy

After several months of illness, Lord Henley died in February 1841, aged 51, at his home at 19 Whitehall Place, Westminster, and was succeeded in the barony by his eldest surviving son, Anthony. Lady Henley died in 1869.

== Arms ==
Coat of arms of Robert Henley, 2nd Baron Henley
Crest A dexter arm embowed in armour couped at the shoulder proper and grasping a garb or banded vert. Escutcheon Gules, on a chevron argent, between three garbs or, banded vert, as many escallops sable, an annulet for difference. Supporters Dexter, a lion argent, semée of torteaux, ducally crowned or having a plain collar of the last rimmed azure, on the collar three escallops sable, and pendent therefrom a shield gold, charged with an eagle displayed with two heads sable; Sinister, a stag argent, semée of torteaux, attired or, and gorged with a plain collar of the last rimmed azure, and charged with three escallops sable, pendant therefrom an escutcheon also or, charged with an eagle displayed with one head also sable. Motto Si Sit Prudentia (If there be but prudence).

Parliament of the United Kingdom
Preceded by Viscount Valletort; George Lucy	Member of Parliament for Fowey; 1826–1830	Succeeded by George Lucy; Lord Brudenell
Peerage of Ireland
Preceded by Morton Eden	Baron Henley; 1830–1841	Succeeded by Anthony Henley
