= Michael Eden, 7th Baron Henley =

British peer (1914–1977)

The Right Honourable The Lord Henley

President of the Liberal Party
- In office 1966–1967
- Preceded by: Nancy Seear
- Succeeded by: Donald Wade

Member of the House of Lords Lord Temporal
- In office 21 April 1962 – 20 December 1977; Hereditary peerage
- Preceded by: The 6th Baron Henley
- Succeeded by: The 8th Baron Henley

Personal details
- Born: 13 August 1914
- Died: 20 December 1977 (aged 63)
- Party: Liberal

Michael Francis Eden, 7th Baron Henley and 5th Baron Northington (13 August 1914 – 20 December 1977), was a British peer active in Liberal Party politics.

Eden succeeded as Baron Henley and Baron Northington in 1962. He served as President of the Liberal Party from 1966 to 1967, then as chairman from 1968 to 1969. He served as deputy whip of the party in the House of Lords. In 1973, he was appointed Chairman of the Council for the Protection of Rural England. Outside politics, he bought and restored Scaleby Castle.

== Arms ==
Coat of arms of Eden, Barons Henley
Crest A dexter arm embowed in armour couped at the shoulder proper and grasping a garb or banded vert. Escutcheon Quarterly: 1st and 4th gules, on a chevron argent, between three garbs or, banded vert, as many escallops sable (Eden); 2nd and 3rd Azure, a lion rampant argent, ducally crowned or, within a bordure of the second, charged with eight torteaux (Henley). Supporters Dexter, a lion argent, semée of torteaux, ducally crowned or having a plain collar of the last rimmed azure, on the collar three escallops sable, and pendent therefrom a shield gold, charged with an eagle displayed with two heads sable; Sinister, a stag argent, semée of torteaux, attired or, and gorged with a plain collar of the last rimmed azure, and charged with three escallops sable, pendant therefrom an escutcheon also or, charged with an eagle displayed with one head also sable. Motto Si Sit Prudentia (If there be but prudence).

Party political offices
Preceded by Nancy Seear	President of the Liberal Party; 1966–1967	Succeeded by Donald Wade
Preceded by Timothy Beaumont	Chairman of the Liberal Party; 1968–1969	Succeeded by Desmond Banks
Peerage of Ireland
Preceded by Francis Eden	Baron Henley; 1962–1977	Succeeded by Oliver Eden
Peerage of the United Kingdom
Preceded by Francis Eden	Baron Northington; 1962–1977; Member of the House of Lords (1962–1977)	Succeeded by Oliver Eden
