= Oliver Eden, 8th Baron Henley =

British politician (born 1953)

The Right Honourable The Lord Henley PC
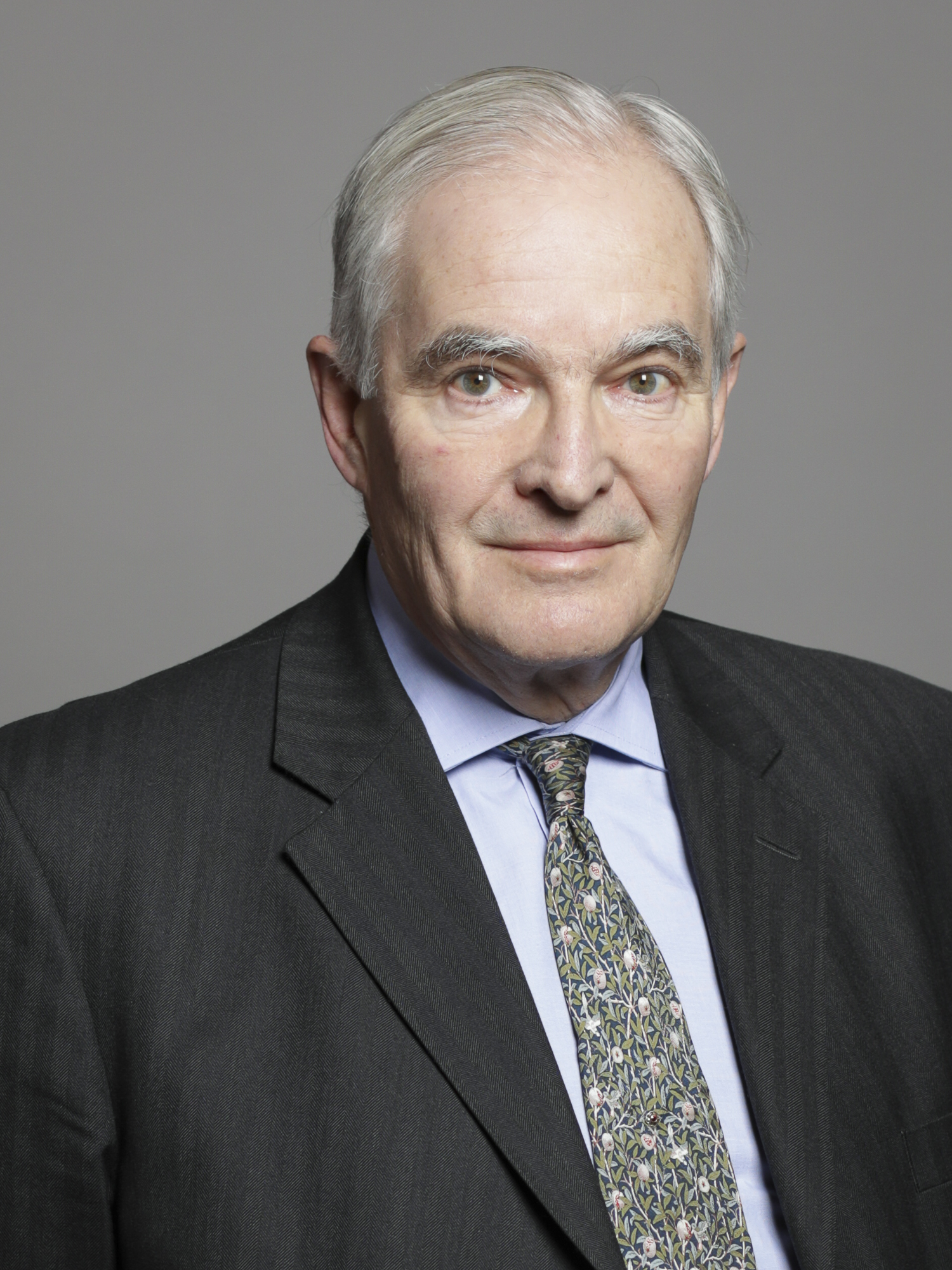
- Lord Henley in 2019

Parliamentary Under-Secretary of State for Business, Energy and Industrial Strategy
- In office 27 October 2017 – 26 July 2019
- Prime Minister: Theresa May
- Preceded by: The Lord Prior of Brampton
- Succeeded by: The Lord Duncan of Springbank

Parliamentary Under-Secretary of State for Work and Pensions
- In office 21 December 2016 – 15 June 2017
- Prime Minister: Theresa May
- Preceded by: The Lord Freud
- Succeeded by: The Baroness Buscombe

Lord-in-waiting Government Whip
- In office 21 November 2016 – 20 June 2017
- Prime Minister: Theresa May
- Preceded by: The Lord Ashton of Hyde
- Succeeded by: The Baroness Vere of Norbiton
- In office 13 February 1989 – 24 July 1989
- Prime Minister: Margaret Thatcher
- Preceded by: New appointment
- Succeeded by: The Viscount Ullswater

Minister of State for Crime Prevention and Antisocial Behaviour Reduction
- In office 16 September 2011 – 4 September 2012
- Prime Minister: David Cameron
- Preceded by: The Baroness Browning
- Succeeded by: Jeremy Browne

Parliamentary Under-Secretary of State for Resource Management, the Local Environment and Environmental Science
- In office 11 May 2010 – 16 September 2011
- Prime Minister: David Cameron
- Preceded by: The Lord Davies of Oldham
- Succeeded by: The Lord Taylor of Holbeach

Opposition Chief Whip of the House of Lords
- In office 3 December 1998 – 18 September 2001
- Leader: William Hague
- Preceded by: The Lord Strathclyde
- Succeeded by: The Lord Cope of Berkeley

Minister of State for Education and Employment
- In office 6 July 1995 – 2 May 1997
- Prime Minister: John Major
- Preceded by: Ann Widdecombe
- Succeeded by: The Baroness Blackstone

Parliamentary Under-Secretary of State for Defence
- In office 20 July 1994 – 6 July 1995
- Prime Minister: John Major
- Preceded by: The Viscount Cranborne
- Succeeded by: The Earl Howe

Parliamentary Under-Secretary of State for Employment
- In office 16 September 1993 – 20 July 1994
- Prime Minister: John Major
- Preceded by: The Viscount Ullswater
- Succeeded by: James Paice

Parliamentary Under-Secretary of State for Social Security
- In office 25 July 1989 – 28 November 1990
- Prime Minister: Margaret Thatcher
- Preceded by: The Lord Skelmersdale
- Succeeded by: Ann Widdecombe

Member of the House of Lords
- Lord Temporal
- Hereditary peerage 28 February 1978 – 11 November 1999
- Preceded by: The 7th Baron Henley
- Succeeded by: Seat abolished
- Elected Hereditary Peer; 11 November 1999 – 29 April 2026
- Election: 1999
- Preceded by: Seat established
- Succeeded by: Seat abolished

Personal details
- Born: Oliver Michael Robert Eden; 22 November 1953 (age 72)
- Party: Conservative
- Education: Collingwood College, Durham

Oliver Michael Robert Eden, 8th Baron Henley, 6th Baron Northington (born 22 November 1953), is a British hereditary peer and Conservative politician, who is a former member of the House of Lords. He has served in a number of ministerial positions in the governments of Margaret Thatcher, John Major, David Cameron and Theresa May, most recently as Parliamentary Under-Secretary of State at the Department for Business, Energy and Industrial Strategy.

Lord Henley served as a Minister of State at the Home Office with responsibility for Crime Prevention and Anti-Social Behaviour Reduction, a role in which he succeeded Baroness Browning in September 2011 to September 2012.

== Early life ==
Henley is the eldest son and fourth child of the 7th Baron Henley and his wife, Nancy Mary Walton. He was educated at Clifton College, a boarding school at Bristol, Collingwood College, Durham University, graduating with a Bachelor of Arts degree in 1975, and finally at the Inns of Court School of Law. He was called to the bar from the Middle Temple in 1977.

== Political career ==
=== By right as an hereditary peer ===
Lord Henley succeeded to the peerage in 1977 upon the death of his father. An Irish peer, he was able to sit in the House of Lords by virtue of a United Kingdom peerage granted to the 3rd Baron Henley, namely Baron Northington. He was an elected County Councillor for Cumbria from 1986 to 1989. He was also at that time President of the Cumbria Association of Local Councils.

He served as a House of Lords whip under Margaret Thatcher from 1989 to July 1990. He then moved to become a Parliamentary Under-Secretary of State at the Department of Social Security, retaining the position when John Major rose to power and serving until 1993. He was then briefly moved to the Department of Employment, when in 1994 he was again fleetingly moved to the Ministry of Defence. In 1995 he was promoted to Minister of State at the Department for Education and Employment, serving until the Conservative government lost the 1997 general election.

=== By election from among hereditary peers ===
With the passage of the House of Lords Act 1999, Lord Henley along with almost all other hereditary peers lost his automatic right to sit in the House of Lords. He was however elected as one of the 92 hereditary peers to remain in the House of Lords pending completion of House of Lords reform. He first served as opposition spokesman for Home Affairs before becoming Opposition Chief Whip in the Lords from 1998 to 2001 and as Opposition spokesman for Justice from 2003 to 2010.

After the 6 May 2010 general election, Lord Henley was appointed Parliamentary Under-Secretary of State at the Department for Environment, Food and Rural Affairs (Defra) in the Cameron Ministry. He was promoted to Minister of State at the Home Office on 16 September 2011, with special responsibility for crime prevention and anti-social behaviour reduction, replacing Baroness Browning, who stepped down for health reasons. He was a member of the Joint Committee on Human Rights until November 2016. On 21 November 2016, it had been announced that he had been appointed a Lord in Waiting, one of the government whips in the House of Lords. In addition to that role, he was appointed as Parliamentary Under-Secretary of State at the Department for Work and Pensions on 21 December 2016.

He was appointed to the Privy Council (PC) in 2013.

== Personal life ==
On 11 October 1984, Henley married Caroline Patricia Sharp, a daughter of Alan G. Sharp, and they have four children. The family seat is Scaleby Castle, Cumberland.

== Arms ==
Coat of arms of Eden, Barons Henley
Crest A dexter arm embowed in armour couped at the shoulder proper and grasping a garb or banded vert. Escutcheon Quarterly: 1st and 4th gules, on a chevron argent, between three garbs or, banded vert, as many escallops sable (Eden); 2nd and 3rd Azure, a lion rampant argent, ducally crowned or, within a bordure of the second, charged with eight torteaux (Henley). Supporters Dexter, a lion argent, semée of torteaux, ducally crowned or having a plain collar of the last rimmed azure, on the collar three escallops sable, and pendent therefrom a shield gold, charged with an eagle displayed with two heads sable; Sinister, a stag argent, semée of torteaux, attired or, and gorged with a plain collar of the last rimmed azure, and charged with three escallops sable, pendant therefrom an escutcheon also or, charged with an eagle displayed with one head also sable. Motto Si Sit Prudentia (If there be but prudence).

== Notes ==
Party political offices
Preceded by The Lord Strathclyde	Conservative Chief Whip in the House of Lords; 1998–2001	Succeeded by The Lord Cope of Berkeley
Political offices
Preceded by The Lord Strathclyde	Opposition Chief Whip of the House of Lords; 1998–2001	Succeeded by The Lord Cope of Berkeley
Preceded by The Baroness Browning	Minister of State for Crime Prevention and Antisocial Behaviour Reduction; 2011–2012	Position abolished
Peerage of Ireland
Preceded by Michael Eden	Baron Henley; 1977–present	Incumbent; Heir apparent: Hon. John Eden
Peerage of the United Kingdom
Preceded by Michael Eden	Baron Northington; 1977–present Member of the House of Lords (1978–1999)	Incumbent; Heir apparent: Hon. John Eden
Parliament of the United Kingdom
New office created by the House of Lords Act 1999	Elected hereditary peer to the House of Lords under the House of Lords Act 1999 (as Baron Northington); 1999–2026	Office abolished under the House of Lords (Hereditary Peers) Act 2026
