= William Eden (MP) =

British soldier and politician (1782–1810)

William Frederick Elliot Eden MP (19 January 1782 – January 1810) was a British soldier, politician and Member of Parliament, serving as Teller of the Exchequer.

== Life ==
Born into the influential Eden family, one of fourteen children, William was the eldest son of William Eden, later to become the 1st Baron Auckland, and his wife Eleanor Elliot, daughter of Sir Gilbert Elliot, 3rd Baronet.

== Career ==
Eden became MP for Woodstock in the 1806 general election, the same constituency as his father had represented. In the same year he was given the position of Teller of the Receipt of the Exchequer.

Eden was also a Lieutenant-Colonel in the Westminster Volunteers.

== Death ==
The drowned body of Eden was found by a bargeman, William Western, in the River Thames, London, on 25 February 1810. He had been missing since 19 January. Although he was thought to have committed suicide on that day, the inquest jury returned a verdict of "Found drowned in the river, but by what means it came there, there was no evidence before the Jury." William Western received £50 for finding the body.

William's brother George succeeded their father in the Auckland barony. William Eden was unmarried.

Parliament of the United Kingdom
| Preceded by Sir Henry Dashwood, Bt; Charles Abbot | Member of Parliament for Woodstock; 1806–1810; With: Sir Henry Dashwood, Bt | Succeeded by Sir Henry Dashwood, Bt; Hon. George Eden |
Political offices
| Preceded by Edward Thurlow, 1st Baron Thurlow | Teller of the Exchequer; 1806–1810 | Succeeded by Charles Philip Yorke |
