= Sir Frederick Eden, 2nd Baronet =

English writer on social conditions (1766–1809)

Sir Frederick Eden Bt

Personal details
- Born: 18 June 1766 Durham, England
- Died: 14 November 1809 (aged 43) Annapolis, Maryland, US
- Spouse: Anne Smith (m. 1792; died 1808)
- Relations: Charles Calvert, 5th Baron Baltimore (Grandfather)
- Children: 8, including Robert, George, and Charles

Sir Frederick Morton Eden, 2nd Baronet, of Maryland (18 June 1766 – 14 November 1809) was an English writer on poverty and pioneering social investigator.

== Early life ==
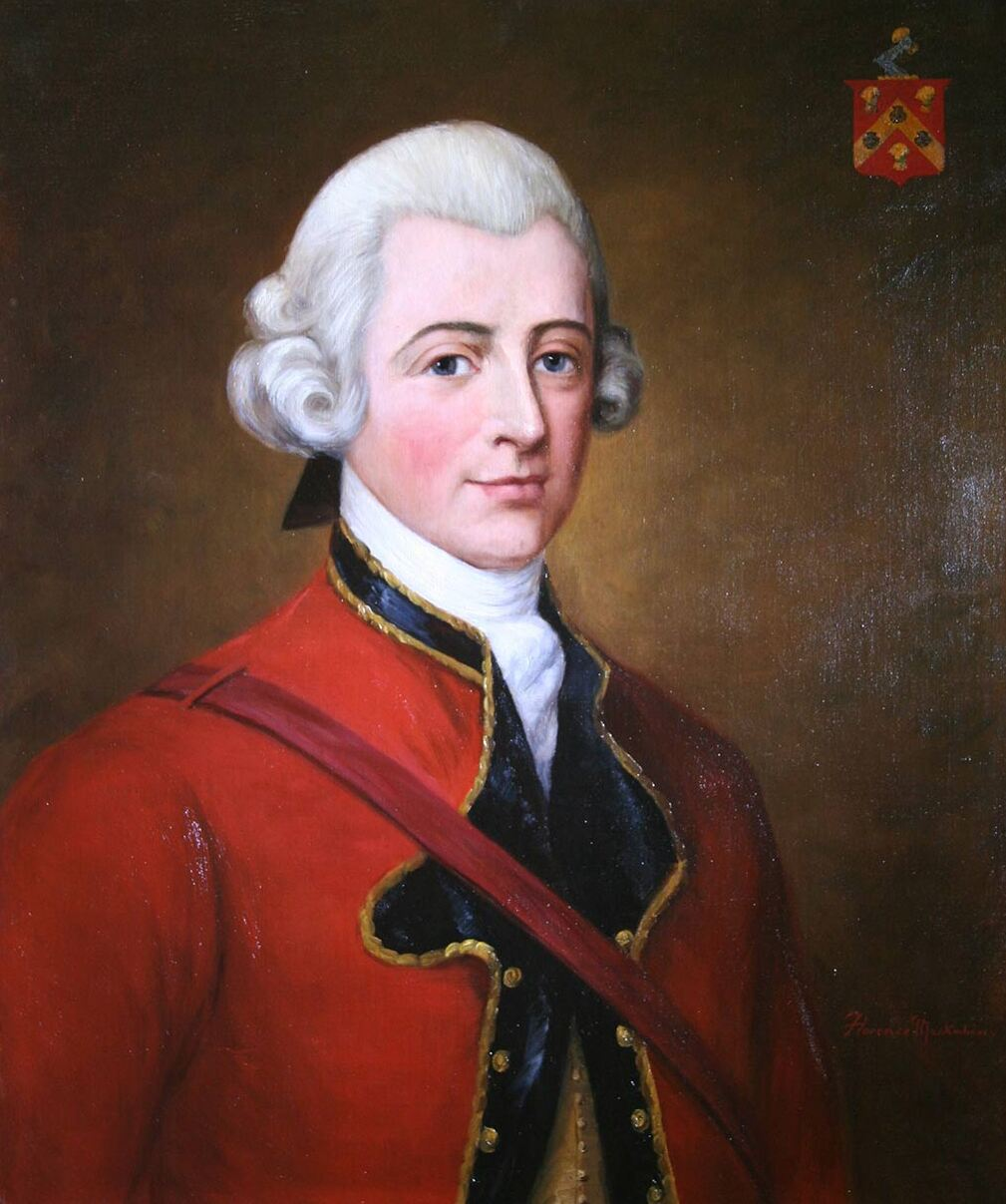
Frederick Eden's father, Sir Robert Eden, 1st Baronet, of Maryland

Frederick Morton Eden was the eldest son of Sir Robert Eden, 1st Baronet, of Maryland, and his wife Caroline Calvert, sister of the last Lord Baltimore and niece of Thomas Bladen's wife. His father was governor of Maryland and was created a baronet in 1776. Frederick inherited the baronetcy on the death of his father in 1784. Eden studied at Christ Church, Oxford. He was one of the founders of the Globe Insurance Company and later its chairman. in 1809, aged 43, he died suddenly at the office of the company he founded.

== Career ==
Eden’s reputation as a social investigator rests on The State of the Poor, published in three volumes in 1797. He explained the circumstances that led him to do the research:

The difficulties which the labouring classes experienced, from the high price of grain, and of provisions in general, as well as of cloathing [sic] and fuel, during the years 1794 and 1795, induced me, from motives both of benevolence and personal curiosity, to investigate their conditions in various parts of the kingdom.

The book was intended to provide a factual basis for the contemporary debate on what to do about the poor. Eden wrote at the beginning of the book:

These and many similar questions [relating to the poor laws] cannot, as it seems to me, be fully and satisfactorily answered, unless many minute circumstances are previously stated, which have been rarely sufficiently attended to in the plausible and ingenious but unsolid speculations of several merely theoretic reasoners.

In the style of the time, the full title of the book is a catalogue of its contents:

The State of the Poor: or a history of the labouring classes in England, from the Conquest to the present period; in which are particularly considered, their domestic economy, with respect to diet, dress, fuel, and habitation; and the various plans which, from time to time, have been proposed and adopted for the relief of the poor: together with parochial reports relative to the administration of work-houses, and houses of industry; the state of the Friendly Societies, and other public institutions; in several agricultural, commercial and manufacturing, districts. With a large appendix; containing a comparative and chronological table of the prices of labour, of provisions, and of other commodities; an account of the poor in Scotland; and many original documents on subjects of national importance.

Eden did some of the fieldwork himself, obtaining information from clergymen and sending out "a remarkably faithful and intelligent person" with a questionnaire he had designed. This was modelled on that used by Sir John Sinclair in his Statistical Account of Scotland.

== Influence and legacy ==
In The Literature of Political Economy McCulloch wrote of Eden's work "Altogether, this is the grand storehouse of information respecting the labouring classes of England, and should have a prominent place in every library."

Karl Marx wrote that Eden was "the only disciple of Adam Smith during the eighteenth century that produced any work of any importance"' (DNB). However, he also criticised his advocacy of expropriation of the poor and vulnerable by the ruling classes. In Capital, Marx cites Eden: "It may, perhaps be worthy the attention of the public to consider, whether any manufacture, which, in order to be carried on successfully, requires that cottages and workhouses should be ransacked for poor children; that they should be employed by turns during the greater part of the night and robbed of that rest which, though indispensable to all, is most required by the young; and that numbers of both sexes, of different ages and dispositions, should be collected together in such a manner that the contagion of example cannot but lead to profligacy and debauchery; will add to the sum of individual or national felicity?"

Edgeworth wrote the article on Eden in the original Palgrave Dictionary. He considered that the book entitled Eden to "rank with Arthur Young as one of those immediate successors of Adam Smith who best developed the inductive branch of political economy."

The 20th-century British Prime Minister Anthony Eden was a kinsman and, according to a recent biography (D.R. Thorpe Eden: The Life and Times of Anthony Eden ), he was influenced by F. M. Eden's work and kept a copy on his shelves throughout his life.

== Family life ==
Eden married Anne Smith on 10 January 1792 and stayed married until her death on the 14th July 1808. They had eight children:

- Marianne Eden (c. 1793 – 13 May 1859)
- Sir Frederick Eden, 3rd Baronet (c. 1794 – December 1814)
- Caroline Eden (c. 1801 – 10 November 1854) married Vice-Admiral Hyde Parker
- Sir William Eden, 4th/6th Bt.+1 (31 Jan 1803 – 21 Oct 1873). He was the father of Sir William Eden, 7th Baronet.
- Rt Reverend Robert Eden (2 September 1804 – 26 Aug 1886)
- Lieutenant-General George Morton Eden (10 May 1806 – November 1862)
- Vice-Admiral Sir Charles Eden (3 July 1808 – 7 Mar 1878)

== See also ==
- Eden baronets

Baronetage of Great Britain
Preceded by Robert Eden	Baronet (of Maryland); 1784–1809	Succeeded by Frederick Eden
