= Nicholas Eden, 2nd Earl of Avon =

British Army officer and politician (1930–1985)

Major The Right Honourable The Earl of Avon OBE TD DL

Parliamentary Under-Secretary of State for Environment
- In office 11 September 1984 – 27 March 1985
- Prime Minister: Margaret Thatcher
- Preceded by: new appointment
- Succeeded by: Angela Rumbold

Parliamentary Under-Secretary of State for Energy
- In office 6 January 1983 – 11 September 1984
- Prime Minister: Margaret Thatcher
- Preceded by: David Mellor
- Succeeded by: David Hunt

Lord-in-waiting Government Whip
- In office 22 September 1980 – 6 January 1983
- Prime Minister: Margaret Thatcher
- Preceded by: The Lord Mowbray
- Succeeded by: The Lord Lucas of Chilworth

Member of the House of Lords Lord Temporal
- In office 14 January 1977 – 17 August 1985; Hereditary Peerage
- Preceded by: The 1st Earl of Avon
- Succeeded by: Peerage extinct

Personal details
- Born: Nicholas Eden; 3 October 1930
- Died: 17 August 1985 (aged 54) London, England
- Party: Conservative
- Parent(s): Anthony Eden, 1st Earl of Avon; Beatrice Beckett

Nicholas Eden, 2nd Earl of Avon, OBE, TD, DL (3 October 1930 – 17 August 1985), styled Viscount Eden between 1961 and 1977, was a British Army officer and, later, a Conservative politician. He was the younger son of Prime Minister Sir Anthony Eden and his first wife, Beatrice (née Beckett).

== Career ==
Eden was educated at Ludgrove School and Eton College. Called up for National Service, he was commissioned a second lieutenant in the King's Royal Rifle Corps, his father's former regiment, on 20 May 1950. He transferred to a Territorial Army commission with effect from 6 August 1953, in the same rank (seniority from 20 May 1950), and was promoted to acting lieutenant from the same date (seniority from 17 January 1952). He served as ADC to the Governor General of Canada from 1952 to 1953. He was promoted to acting captain on 1 March 1956, to the substantive rank on 3 October 1957 (seniority from 1 March 1956), to acting major on 1 November 1959 and to substantive major on 3 October 1964 (seniority from 1 November 1959. He was awarded the Territorial Decoration (TD) in 1965 and was appointed Officer of the Order of the British Empire (OBE) in the 1970 New Year Honours for his military service. Regimentally within the Territorial Army he served from 1953 with Queen Victoria's Rifles and from 1961 to 1970 its successor the Queen's Royal Rifles. He was appointed an ADC (TAVR) to the Queen in 1978.

He was appointed a Deputy Lieutenant of the Greater London county in 1973 and Vice Chairman of the Greater London TAVR Association.

Eden succeeded to the earldom on the death of his father in 1977, his elder brother Pilot Officer Simon Gascoigne Eden having been killed in action in June 1945, while serving as a navigator with the RAF in Burma.

=== Government service ===
Having risen to the rank of lieutenant-colonel in the Royal Green Jackets, Lord Avon served under Margaret Thatcher as British Parliamentary delegate to the North Atlantic Assembly from 1979, a Lord-in-waiting from 1980 to 1983, as Under-Secretary of State for Energy from 1983 to 1984 and as Under-Secretary of State for the Environment from 1984 until his resignation because of ill health in March 1985, shortly before his death.

== Personal life ==
Widely known to have been homosexual, Lord Avon was unmarried and died from complications related to AIDS at the age of 54. The cause of death on the death certificate was stated as meningoencephalitis or "inflammation of the brain." Upon his death, his titles became extinct. At the time of his death, the News of the World identified a man "listed as authorizing cremation of Avon's body as an antiques dealer who lived with Avon in Holland Park."

The character of Peter Morton in the 1992 film Peter's Friends is said to have been partly inspired by Lord Avon.

== Arms ==
Coat of arms of Nicholas Eden, 2nd Earl of Avon
Crest A dexter arm embowed in armour couped at the shoulder proper and grasping a garb or banded vert. Escutcheon Gules on a chevron argent between three garbs or banded Vert as many escallops sable. Supporters Dexter, A leopard guardant or, resting the sinister hind paw on a garb or, banded vert; Sinister, A like leopard resting the dexter hind paw on a similar garb. Motto Si Sit Prudentia (If there be but prudence).

Political offices
Preceded by The Lord Mowbray	Lord-in-waiting; 1980 – 1983	Succeeded by The Lord Lucas of Chilworth
Preceded by John Moore; David Mellor	Joint Under-Secretary of State for Energy with John Moore 1983; Giles Shaw 1983–1984; 1983–1984	Succeeded by Giles Shaw; David Hunt
Preceded by Sir George Young, Bt; Hon. William Waldegrave	Joint Under-Secretary of State for the Environment with Sir George Young, Bt; 1984–1985	Succeeded by Sir George Young, Bt; Angela Rumbold
Peerage of the United Kingdom
Preceded by Anthony Eden	Earl of Avon; 1977–1985	Extinct
