= Morton Eden, 1st Baron Henley =

British diplomat (1752–1830)

The Right Honourable The Lord Henley GCB PC FRS

Minister Plenipotentiary to Bavaria
- In office 1776–1779

Envoy Extraordinary to Denmark
- In office 1779–1783

Minister Plenipotentiary to Saxony
- In office 1783–1791

Minister Plenipotentiary to Prussia
- In office 1791–1793

Ambassador to Austria
- In office 1793–1794

Ambassador Extraordinary to Spain
- In office 1794–1794

Envoy Extraordinary to Austria
- In office 1794–1799

Personal details
- Born: Morton Frederick Eden; 8 July 1752 West Auckland, County Durham
- Died: 6 December 1830 (aged 78) Gumley Hall, Leicestershire
- Resting place: Watford, Northamptonshire
- Spouse: Lady Elizabeth Henley
- Children: 4
- Education: Eton College; Christ Church, Oxford

Morton Frederick Eden, 1st Baron Henley (8 July 1752 – 6 December 1830), was a British diplomat and peer.

== Early life and education ==
Eden was the fifth son of Sir Robert Eden, 3rd Baronet, and Mary Davison, youngest daughter of William Davison of Beamish, County Durham. His three eldest brothers were Sir John Eden, 4th Baronet, Sir Robert Eden, 1st Baronet, of Maryland, and William Eden, 1st Baron Auckland.

He was educated at Eton and Christ Church, Oxford.

== Career ==
From 1776 to 1779, Eden was Minister to Bavaria, then to Copenhagen 1779–1782, Dresden 1783–1791, Berlin 1791–1793 and Vienna 1793–1794. From 1794 to 1795, he was Ambassador to Spain, and returned as Minister to Vienna in 1794–1799. He then retired with a pension of £2000.

Eden was knighted in 1791 and admitted to the Privy Council in 1794. In 1799, Eden was created Baron Henley (Henly), of Chardstock, in the Peerage of Ireland, in honour of his wife's family. His wife was the co-heiress to her brother, Robert Henley, 2nd Earl of Northington, who died unmarried in 1786, and his earldom and subsidiary title of Baron Henley in the Peerage of Great Britain had become extinct. The Irish peerage did not allow Henley to sit in the House of Lords.

== Marriage and issue ==
On 7 August 1783, Eden married Lady Elizabeth Henley (the youngest daughter of the 1st Earl of Northington) and they had four children:

- Hon. Frederick Eden (19 August 1784 – 5 November 1823), barrister; died unmarried at his chambers at Inner Temple
- Hon. Robert Eden (1789–1841), succeeded his father in the barony
- Hon. Rev. William Henley (7 November 1792 – 4 May 1859), Rector of Bishopsbourne, Kent; married in 1820 Anna Maria Yelverton, daughter of William Kellam and widow of the 19th Lord Grey de Ruthyn
- Hon. Mary Jane (22 November 1795 – 12 September 1843); married in 1824 Sir Edmund Cradock-Hartopp, 2nd Baronet

Lord Henley died in 1830 and was succeeded by his eldest surviving son, Robert, who adopted the surname Henley.

== Arms ==
Coat of arms of Morton Eden, 1st Baron Henley
Crest A dexter arm embowed in armour couped at the shoulder proper and grasping a garb or banded vert. Escutcheon Gules, on a chevron argent, between three garbs or, banded vert, as many escallops sable, an annulet for difference. Supporters Dexter, a lion argent, semée of torteaux, ducally crowned or having a plain collar of the last rimmed azure, on the collar three escallops sable, and pendent therefrom a shield gold, charged with an eagle displayed with two heads sable; Sinister, a stag argent, semée of torteaux, attired or, and gorged with a plain collar of the last rimmed azure, and charged with three escallops sable, pendant therefrom an escutcheon also or, charged with an eagle displayed with one head also sable. Motto Si Sit Prudentia (If there be but prudence). Orders The Most Honourable Order of the Bath (Knight Grand Cross, civil division)

Diplomatic posts
Preceded by Hugh Elliot	British Minister to Bavaria; 1776–1779	Succeeded by Hon. John Trevor
Preceded by Ralph Woodford	British Minister to Denmark; 1779–1782	Succeeded by Hugh Elliot
Preceded by Sir John Stepney, Bt	British Minister to Saxony; 1783–1791	Succeeded by Hugh Elliot
Preceded by Joseph Ewart	British Minister to Prussia; 1791–1793	Succeeded by The Lord Malmesbury
Preceded by The Earl of Elgin	British Minister to Austria; 1793–1794	Succeeded by The Earl Spencer
Preceded by The Lord St Helens	British Ambassador to Spain; 1794–1795	Succeeded by The Lord Cardiff
Preceded by The Earl Spencer	British Minister to Austria; 1794–1799	Succeeded by The Lord Minto
Peerage of Ireland
New creation	Baron Henley; 2nd creation 1799–1830	Succeeded by Robert Henley
