= Robert Eden (bishop) =

British Anglican bishop (1804–1886)

The Most Reverend Robert Eden
- Bishop of Moray, Ross and Caithness; Primus of the Scottish Episcopal Church
- Eden, late 1850s
- Church: Scottish Episcopal Church
- Diocese: Moray, Ross and Caithness
- Elected: 4 February 1851
- In office: 1851–1886
- Predecessor: David Low
- Successor: James Kelly
- Other post: Primus of the Scottish Episcopal Church (1862–1886)
- Previous post: Bishop of Moray and Ross (1851–1864)

Orders
- Ordination: January 1828 (deacon); December 1828 (priest) by Christopher Bethell
- Consecration: 9 March 1851 by William Skinner
- Rank: Primus & Bishop

Personal details
- Born: 2 September 1804 London, England
- Died: 26 August 1886 (aged 81) Inverness, Scotland
- Buried: Tomnahurich Cemetery
- Denomination: Anglican
- Parents: Frederick Eden & Anne Smith
- Spouse: Emma Park (m. 1827; died 1880)
- Children: 5 sons 5 daughters
- Education: Christ Church, Oxford

Robert Eden (2 September 1804 – 26 August 1886) was a British Anglican bishop. He was Bishop of Moray, Ross and Caithness and Primus of the Scottish Episcopal Church.

== Personal life ==
Eden, the third son of Sir Frederick Eden, 2nd Baronet, was born on 2 September 1804 and educated at Westminster School and Christ Church, Oxford. He took a third class in Classics in 1826 and proceeded B.A. in 1827. Ordained deacon in January 1828 and priest in December 1828 by Christopher Bethell, the Bishop of Gloucester, he served successively the curacies of Weston-sub-Edge in Gloucestershire, and Messing and Peldon in Essex, and became Rector of St Clement's Church, Leigh-on-Sea, in Essex in 1837. Here, on the resignation of Bishop Low, he accepted the offer of the Scottish See of Moray and Ross; he was consecrated at Old Saint Paul's, Edinburgh, 9 March 1851. On this occasion his university conferred on him the degree of D.D. In 1862 he was elected Primus of the Scottish Episcopal Church, in succession to Bishop Terrot. In 1827 he married Emma, daughter of Justice Allan Park, by whom he had five sons and five daughters. He died peacefully on the evening of 26 August 1886, at his official residence in Inverness.

== Assessment of his accomplishments ==
The progress which Scottish episcopacy made in his time must be attributed largely to his influence. He had given up a comfortable English living worth £500 or £600 a year for a position of which the yearly emoluments were not more than £150 (about £15,400 today), and where there was no settled residence. His pro-cathedral was a small cottage, fitted up as a mission chapel, on the bank of the River Ness. During his tenure he quadrupled the income of the see, founded the beautiful Inverness Cathedral, and was mainly instrumental in securing a residence for his successor. Dignified and firm in character, he was a good and sound, rather than a brilliant, preacher. He was on the most intimate terms of friendship with Archbishop Longley and Bishops Blomfield, Selwyn, Hamilton, and Wilberforce, the last of whom said that his power of surmounting difficulties was just that of his ability at school to jump over anything that he could reach with his nose. Among his most noticeable public acts were his cordial recognition of M. Loyson (Père Hyacinthe); his co-operation with the Duke of Buccleuch in removing the disabilities of Scottish orders in the ministry of the Church of England; his labours to promote union with the Eastern church; and his enlisting Archbishop Longley to take part in the foundation of Inverness Cathedral. His defence, in opposition to all the other Scottish bishops, of Bishop Wilberforce, who had held an English service in the presbyterian chapel of Glengarry, Inverness-shire, was perhaps due less to the somewhat Erastian tone which uniformly pervaded Eden's political acts than to the mollifying effect produced by the personal visit of Wilberforce.

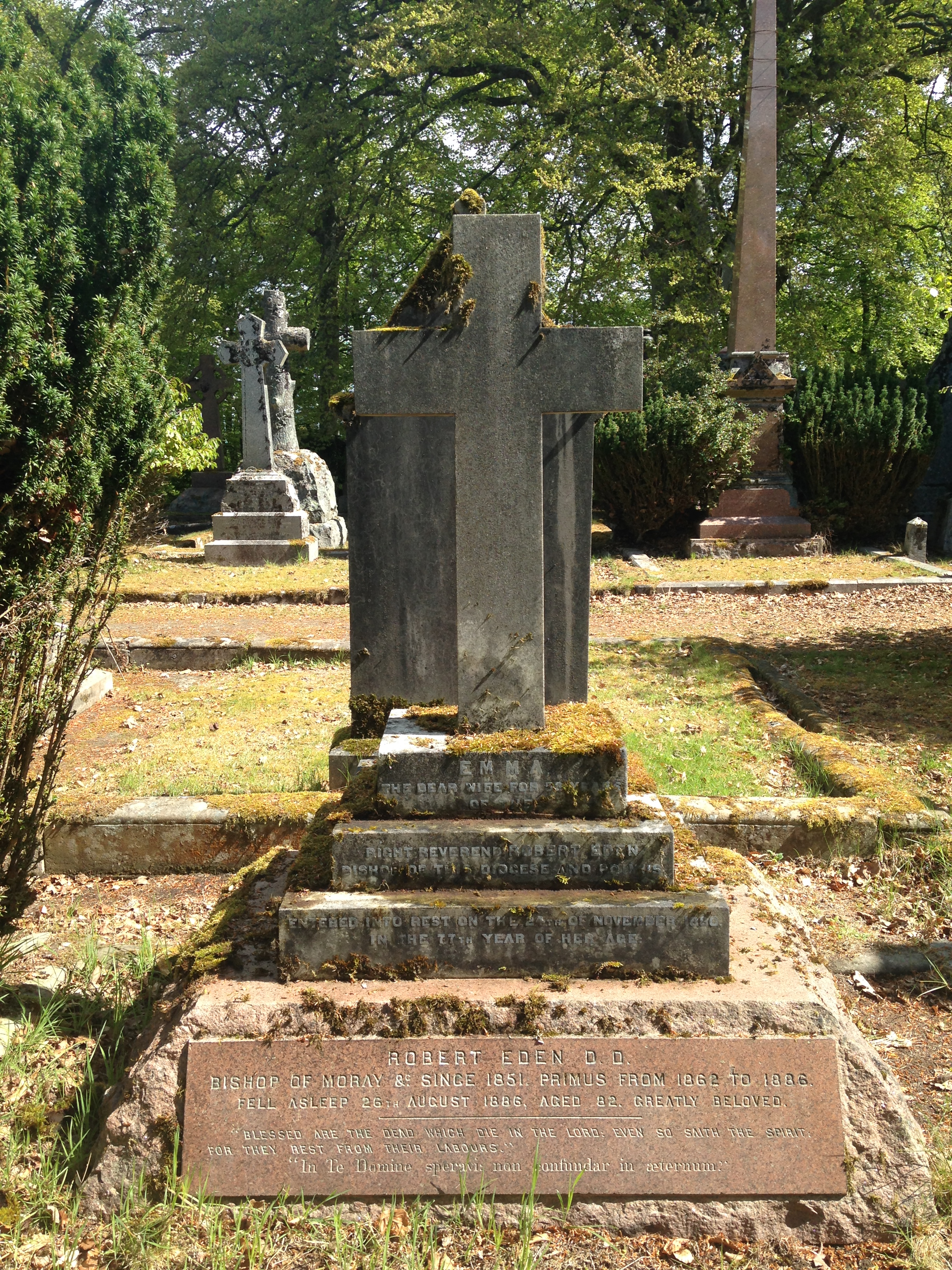
Grave site of Bishop Eden at the Tomnahurich Cemetery

== The Church Society ==
Not the least service rendered by the Primus to the Scottish church was in 1876. Large and excited meetings of its members were held in Edinburgh for the purpose of remodelling the whole financial system of the church. The Church Society, the creation of the popular Dean Ramsay, had long shown signs of inability to cope with the growing wants of the church. A small body of reformers aimed at replacing this society by an organisation which should represent every congregation, and those who had worked hard and generously on the old lines were opposed to this. The result, therefore, depended on the view which the primus would take. He threw in his lot with the reformers, and composed many heated debates by his courtly suavity and excellent knowledge of business. The new financial body thus formed, known as the Representative Church Council, has been so successful as to justify his action.

Eden was perhaps a better primus than diocesan bishop; his bonhomie and love of telling jocose stories somewhat scared strict spirits. Yet his grand manner, which, said one of his clergymen, "made you feel proud of yourself in five minutes," was very telling. Theologically he was a moderate high churchman, politically an uncompromising Tory.

== Works ==
His published works were:

- Some Thoughts on the Inspiration of the Holy Scriptures
- Three tracts against Wesleyan Methodism, published before his episcopate began.
- Four charges.
- Sermons in defence of Scottish episcopacy.
- Sermons on the Prayer Book, on the "International Society of Workmen", and against teetotalism.
- Impressions of a Recent Visit to Russia, a Letter addressed to Chancellor Massingberd, on Intercommunion with the Eastern Orthodox Church, 1866.

In addition, he wrote prefaces to Reginald Shuttle's translation of the Heliotropium: Conformity of the Human Will to the Divine by Jeremias Drexel (Drexelius), and to Dmitry Tolstoy's Romanism in Russia.
