= Charles Eden (Royal Navy officer) =

Royal Navy Admiral (1808–1878)

Admiral Sir Charles Eden KCB
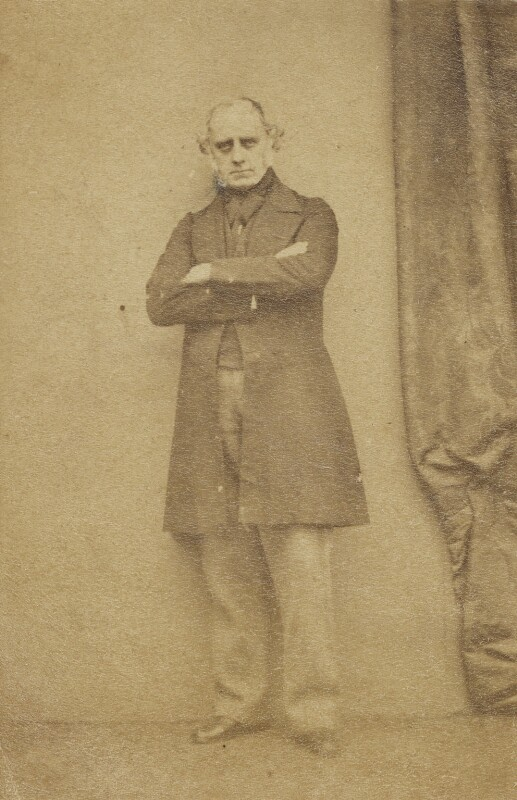
- Born: 3 July 1808
- Died: 7 March 1878 (aged 69)
- Military career
- Allegiance: United Kingdom
- Branch: Royal Navy
- Service years: 1821 – 1866
- Rank: Admiral
- Commands: HMS Winchester; HMS Victory; HMS London
- Conflicts: Crimean War
- Awards: Knight Commander of the Order of the Bath

Admiral Sir Charles Eden, KCB (3 July 1808 – 7 March 1878) was a Royal Navy officer who went on to be Second Naval Lord.

== Naval career ==
Born the fifth son of Sir Frederick Eden, Eden joined the Royal Navy in 1821. He was given command of the fourth-rate HMS Winchester in 1842 and the flagship HMS Victory in 1847.

From 1848 to 1852 he acted as Private Secretary to George Eden, 1st Earl of Auckland and Sir Francis Baring, 3rd Baronet, successively First Lords of the Admiralty. He succeeded his cousin Henry Eden to that position.

He took command of the second-rate HMS London in 1853 and saw action in the bombardment of Sevastopol during the Crimean War. He was awarded the Order of the Medjidie 3rd Class in 1858.

He then became Comptroller-General of the Coastguard in 1855, Third Naval Lord in 1859 and Second Naval Lord in 1861. He was promoted to Rear-Admiral in 1861 and to Vice-Admiral in 1866. He was made a Companion of the Order of the Bath (CB) in 1863.

He was placed on the Retired List in 1870 and elevated to Knight Commander of the Order of the Bath (KCB) in the 1873 Birthday Honours.

He died in Spring Gardens, Westminster in 1878.

== Family ==
In 1828 he married Emma Williams and in 1866 he married Fanny Cecilia Grenville. There were no children from either marriage.

== See also ==
- O'Byrne, William Richard (1849). "Eden, Charles" . A Naval Biographical Dictionary . John Murray – via Wikisource.

Military offices
Preceded by Sir Henry Leeke	Third Naval Lord; 1859–1861	Succeeded by Charles Frederick
Preceded by Frederick Pelham	Second Naval Lord; 1861–1866	Succeeded by Sir Sydney Dacres
