= Sir Robert Eden, 1st Baronet, of Maryland =

British colonial administrator (1741–1784)

Sir Robert Eden Bt
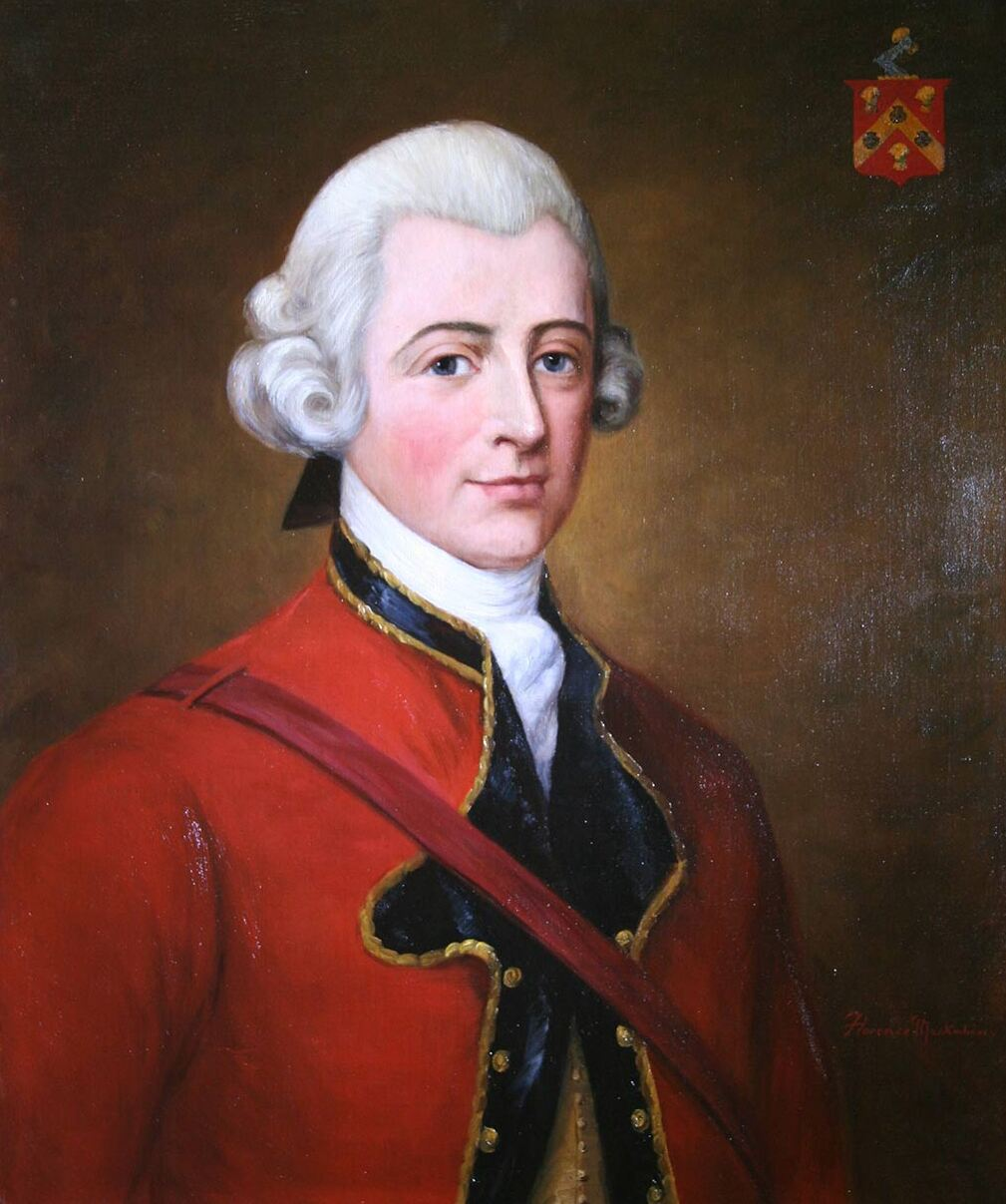
- 1914 portrait

23rd Governor of Restored Proprietary Government
- In office 1769 – 23 June 1776
- Preceded by: Horatio Sharpe
- Succeeded by: Thomas Johnson (as Governor of Maryland)

Personal details
- Born: 14 September 1741 Durham, England
- Died: 2 September 1784 (aged 42) Annapolis, Maryland, US
- Party: Loyalist (Movement)
- Spouse: Caroline Calvert
- Relations: Charles Calvert, 5th Baron Baltimore (father-in-Law); Anthony Eden (Great-Great-Grandson)
- Children: Sir Frederick Morton Eden

Sir Robert Eden, 1st Baronet (14 September 1741 – 2 September 1784) was a British colonial administrator who was the last colonial Governor of Maryland. Although a popular governor and an able administrator, Eden's authority was overthrown by the events of the American Revolution, and in June 1776 he was invited by the Maryland Convention to leave for England. Eden was well-regarded at home and in the same year, 1776, he was made a baronet. He eventually returned to Maryland where he died in 1784 at the age of 42. He was buried in Annapolis and was succeeded in the baronetcy by his eldest son, Frederick, a noted author.

== Early life ==
Eden was born in Durham, England, on 14 September 1741, the second son of Sir Robert Eden, 3rd Baronet, of West Auckland, and the brother of William Eden, 1st Baron Auckland and Morton Eden, 1st Baron Henley and a relative of North Carolina Governor Charles Eden.

== Career ==
In 1763 Eden made an advantageous marriage, wedding Caroline Calvert, daughter of Maryland's proprietor Charles Calvert, 5th Baron Baltimore. In 1766 Caroline bore a son, Frederick. Three years later, in 1769, aged just 28, Robert Eden succeeded Horatio Sharpe as Governor of Maryland, the highest office in the province. As governor, Eden would attempt to maintain authority over the increasingly rebellious province during the tumultuous years preceding the American Revolution.

=== Maryland and the American War of Independence ===
Eden was not among those who believed that coercion would force Marylanders into loyalty to the mother country. During the 1770s opposition to British taxation grew, and the governor's authority began to falter. On 19 April 1774 Eden was forced to prorogue the Colonial Assembly, the last occasion on which it would convene. From this point on the government of Maryland was increasingly in the hands of the Revolutionaries. On 19 October 1774 the Peggy Stewart was burned in Annapolis harbor in protest against taxes on tea, in imitation of the famous Boston Tea Party, which took place on 16 December 1773.

On 30 December 1774 Eden wrote:

The spirit of resistance against the Tea Act, or any mode of internal taxation, is as strong and universal here as ever. I firmly believe that they will undergo any hardship sooner than acknowledge a right in the British Parliament in that particular, and will persevere in their non-importation and non-exportation experiments, in spite of every inconvenience that they must consequently be exposed to, and the total loss of their trade.

Although Eden had some sympathy with the colonists' grievances, he was firmly opposed to armed opposition to the Crown. In the event, Maryland was the only state that did not forcibly eject its last colonial governor from office, choosing instead a formal and largely courteous transfer of power. By 1775 Eden's authority had been effectively usurped by the Annapolis Convention and Eden was eventually asked by the Maryland Council of Safety to step down as governor. The Maryland Convention had been pressed by the Continental Congress (and the Virginians in particular) to arrest and detain Eden but they demurred, preferring to avoid such an "extreme" measure. Instead they argued that:

This Convention, and the Council of Safety for the time being, were the only proper and adequate judges of the propriety and expediency of suffering Governor Eden to depart out of this Province, and have proceeded in that matter upon evidence which was satisfactory to themselves, and to which the convention of Virginia were strangers

Eventually the Maryland Convention formally asked the governor to leave, and Governor Eden finally departed Maryland for England in the ship Fowey on 23 June 1776.

He was created a baronet, of Maryland in North America, on 19 October 1776.

== Family life ==
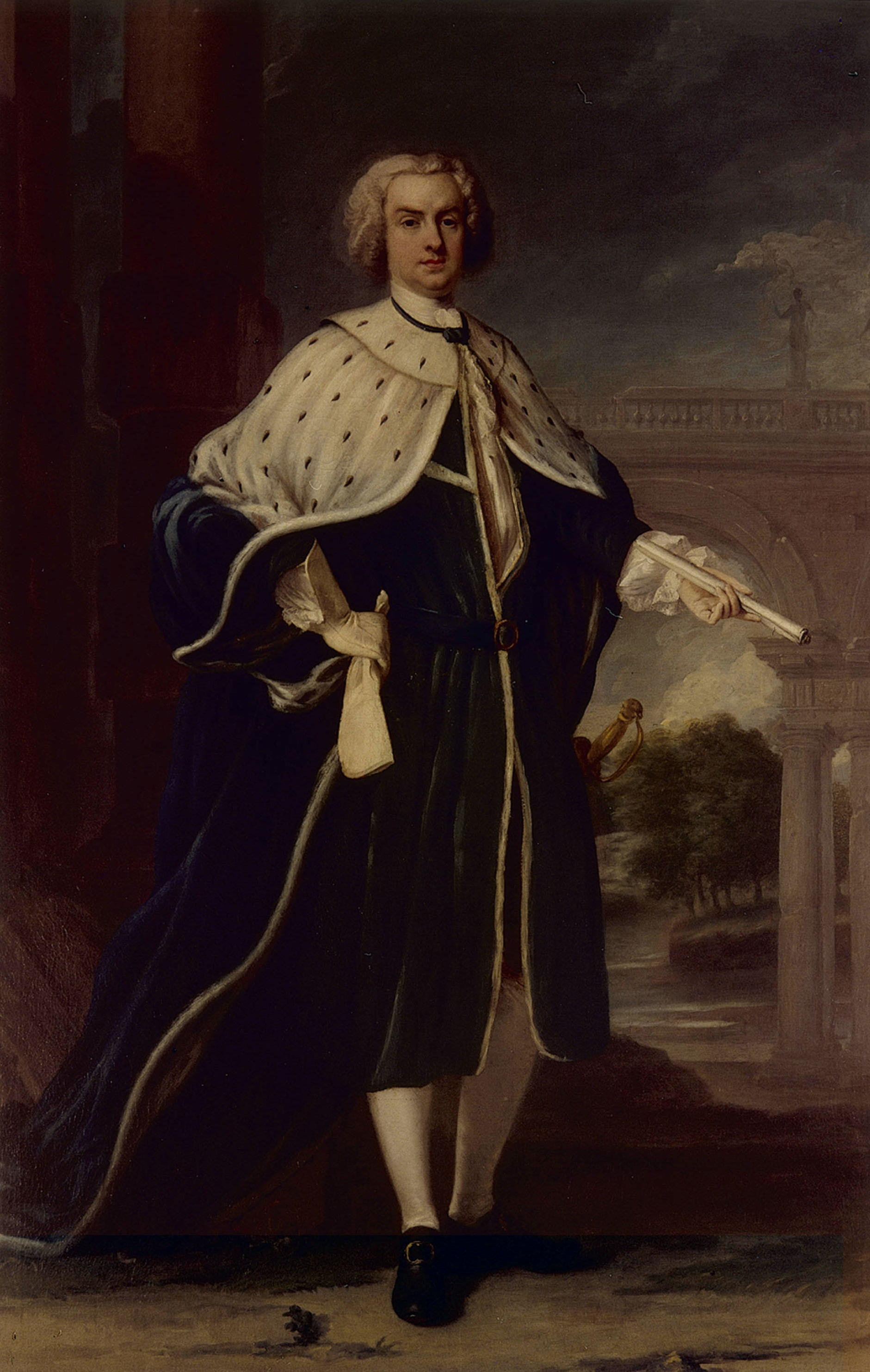
Charles Calvert, 5th Baron Baltimore, Eden's father-in-law

On 26 April 1763 Eden married Caroline Calvert, daughter of Charles Calvert, 5th Baron Baltimore, and in 1769 he succeeded Governor Horatio Sharpe as Governor of Maryland. Caroline was half-sister to Benedict Swingate Calvert, a Judge of the Land office with whom Eden shared a love of horse racing. Benedict Swingate Calvert soon found himself appointed to the Governor's Council.

His son Sir Frederick Morton Eden, 2nd Baronet, of Maryland was a pioneering writer and the author of The State of the Poor, published in 3 volumes in 1797.

Sir Robert Eden, 1st Baronet, of Maryland coat of arms

== Death and legacy ==
Eden died on 2 September 1784 and was buried in Annapolis, Maryland. He was succeeded in the baronetcy by his eldest son, Frederick. Eden was an ancestor of the 20th century British Prime Minister Anthony Eden. The town of Denton, Maryland, originally Edenton or Eden Town, was named for him.

== See also ==
- Eden baronets

== Notes ==
Political offices
Preceded by Horatio Sharpe	Provincial Governor of Maryland; 1769–1776	Succeeded by Thomas Johnson as Governor of Maryland
Baronetage of Great Britain
New creation	Baronet (of Maryland); 1776–1784	Succeeded by Frederick Morton Eden
