= George Morton Eden =

British Army general (1806–1862)

Lieutenant-General George Morton Eden
- Born: 10 May 1806; Ashtead, Surrey
- Died: November 1862 (aged 56); Bern, Switzerland
- Military career
- Allegiance: United Kingdom
- Branch: British Army
- Rank: Lieutenant-General
- Commands: Western District

Lieutenant-General George Morton Eden (10 May 1806 – November 1862) was a British Army officer who became General Officer Commanding Western District.

== Military career ==
Born the fourth son of Sir Frederick Eden, 2nd Baronet and Anne Smith, Eden was commissioned into the 84th Regiment of Foot on 18 July 1822. He subsequently transferred into the 52nd Regiment of Foot and then went to Jamaica, a deployment where many troops died through illness, with the 56th Regiment of Foot. He became General Officer Commanding Western District in 1855. He served as Colonel of 50th Regiment of Foot from 1861 to 1862.

Military offices
Preceded by Sir Harry Smith	GOC Western District; 1855–1859	Succeeded by William Hutchinson
