= List of World War II prisoner-of-war camps in the United Kingdom =

This is an incomplete list of Prisoner of War (POW) Camps located in the United Kingdom during World War II.

German POWs in England were graded as follows: "Grade A (white) were considered anti-Nazi; Grade B (grey) had less clear feelings and were considered not as reliable as the 'whites'; Grade C (black) had probable Nazi leanings; Grade C+ (also Black) were deemed ardent Nazis."

Some camps were classed as General Processing Camps (abbreviated GPC in the table).

There was a large amount of renaming, renumbering and reuse of camp numbers during World War II. The reason for this is unknown but speculation has it that it was to confuse the Axis powers in the event of any attempted breakouts after any potential Paratrooper attack or invasion. Examples:
No. 286 Purfleet Camp, Beacon Hill, Purfleet, Essex
No. 654 Purfleet Camp, No.4 Transit Camp, Beacon Hill, Purfleet, Essex
No. 655 Purfleet Camp, No.1 Transit Camp, Beacon Hill, Purfleet, Essex

== List ==
Camp Number	Camp Name	Near	County
1	Woodfield Farm Camp	Churchdown	Gloucestershire
1	Grizedale Hall	Grizedale, Satterthwaite	Cumbria
2	Toft Hall	Toft, Knutsford	Cheshire
2	Woodhouselee Camp	Milton Bridge, Penicuik	Midlothian
2	Glen Mill	Wellyhole Street, Oldham	Lancashire
3	Balhary Camp	Balhary, Alyth	Perthshire
4	Scraptoft	Thurnby	Leicestershire
4	Gilling Camp	Hartforth Lane, Gilling, Richmond	North Yorkshire
4	Windlestone Hall	Rushyford	County Durham
5	Monrush	Cookstown	County Tyrone Northern Ireland
6	Racecourse Camp	Doncaster	South Yorkshire
6	Long Marston	Stratford-upon-Avon	Warwickshire
6	Glenbranter	Glenbranter	Argyll
6a	Ashton Court	Bower Ashton	Somerset
7	Winter Quarters Camp	Ascot	Berkshire
8	Mile House	Shrewsbury Road, Oswestry, Shrewsbury	Shropshire
8	Warth Mills	Bury	Lancashire
9	Kempton Park Racecourse	Sunbury	Middlesex
9	Quorn Camp	Quorn, Loughborough	Leicestershire
9	Warth Mills	Bury	Lancashire
10	Gosford Camp	Gosford Castle, Markethill	County Armagh
10	Cockfosters Camp	Barnet	London
10	Stamford Camp	Empingham Road, Stamford	Lincolnshire
11	Gilford	Elmfield, Craigavon, Portadown	County Armagh
11	Racecourse Camp	Knavesmire, York	North Yorkshire
11a	Trent Park	Enfield, London	Middlesex
11a	Rayner's Lane	Harrow-on-the Hill, London	Middlesex
12	Elmfield Camp	Gilford, Portadown	Armagh
12	Donaldson's College	West Coates, Edinburgh	Midlothian
12a	Warth Mills	Bury	Lancashire
13	Shap Wells Hotel	Shap, Penrith	Cumbria
13	The Hayes	Swanwick	Derbyshire
14	Bun Camp	Doonfoot, Ayr	Ayrshire
14	Holywood	Jackson Road, Belfast	County Down
15	Shap Wells Hotel	Shap, Penrith	Cumbria
15	Donaldson's College	West Coates, Edinburgh	Midlothian
16	Gosford Camp	Aberlady, Longniddry	East Lothian
16	Flaxley Green	Stilecop Field, Rugeley	Staffordshire
16	Prees Heath	Whitchurch	Shropshire
17	Lodge Moor camp	Redmires Road, Lodge Moor, Sheffield	South Yorkshire
17	Hyde Park Gardens	22 Hyde Park Gardens	London W2
18	Featherstone Camp	Featherstone Castle, Haltwhistle	Northumberland
19	Happendon Camp	Douglas Castle, Douglas	Lanarkshire Scotland
20	Bickham	Bickham Common, Bickham, Yelverton, Tavistock	Devon
20	Bramham No. 1 Camp	Bramham, Boston Spa	West Yorkshire
20	Wilton Park	Beaconsfield	Buckinghamshire
21	Cultybraggan	Comrie, Crieff	Perthshire
22	Pennylands Camp	Cumnock, Ayr	Ayrshire
23	Le Marchant Camp	Devizes	Wiltshire
23	Shrewsbury (GPC)	Shrewsbury	Shropshire
23	Sudbury	Sudbury	Derbyshire
24	Knutsford (MH)	Knutsford	Cheshire
25	Leamington (GPC)	Leamington Spa	Warwickshire
25	Lodge Farm	Farncombe Down, Lambourn	Berkshire
26	Barton Field	Ely	Cambridgeshire
27	Ledbury	Ledbury	Herefordshire
27	Nottingham (GPC)	Nottingham	Nottinghamshire
28	Knighthorpe	Ashby Road, Loughborough	Leicestershire
29	Abergavenny (GPC)	Abergavenny	Monmouthshire
29	Ormskirk (GH)	Ormskirk	Lancashire
29	Royston Heath	Royston	Hertfordshire
30	Aldershot (GPC)	Aldershot	Hampshire
30	Carpenters Road	Stratford	London E15
31	Ettington Park	Newbold-Upon-Stour, Stratford-on-Avon	Warwickshire
32	Wormwood Scrubs	Shepherds Bush	London W12
33	Dancers Hill	South Mimms, Barnet	Hertfordshire
33	Shorncliffe	Folkestone (GPC), Folkestone	Kent
33	Bonnytown Camp, Bonnytown Farm, Working Camp	Dunino, Kingsbarns	Fife
34	Warebank Camp	Kirkwall	Orkney
35	Boughton Park	Boughton, Northampton	Northamptonshire
36	Darlington (GPC)	Darlington	County Durham
36	Hartwell Dog Track Camp	Stone, Aylesbury	Buckinghamshire
37	Bridgwater (GPC)	Bridgwater	Somerset
37	Sudeley Castle	Winchcombe, Cheltenham	Gloucestershire
38	Pool Park	Efenechtyd, Ruthin	Denbighshire
39	Castle Maxstoke	Maxstoke, Coleshill	Warwickshire
40	Somerhill Camp	Tudeley, Tonbridge	Kent
41	Ganger Camp	Romsey	Hampshire
42	Exhibition Field Camp	Stanhope Close, Holsworthy	Devon
43	Harcourt Hill	North Hinksey, Oxford	Oxfordshire
44	Goathurst Camp	Goathurst, Bridgwater	Somerset
45	Trumpington	Trumpington, Cambridge	Cambridgeshire
46	Kingsfold Camp	Billingshurst, Horsham	West Sussex
47	Motcombe Park	Motcombe, Shaftesbury	Dorset
49	Harrington Camp	Farndon Road, Market Harborough	Leicestershire
52	Nether Headon	Nether Headon, Retford	Nottinghamshire
61	Wynol's Hill	Coalway, Coleford	Gloucestershire
65	Setley Plain	Brockenhurst	Hampshire
71	Sheriffhales	Shifnal, Telford	Shropshire
81	Pingley Farm	Brigg	North Lincolnshire
82	Matlaske, On RAF station	Matlaske, Sheringham	Norfolk
83	Eden Camp	Ryton, Malton	North Yorkshire
93	Harperley	Fir Tree, Crook	County Durham
95	Batford	Harpenden	Hertfordshire
97	Birdingbury Camp, Working Camp	Birdingbury, Bourton-on-Dunsmore	Warwickshire
103	Moota camp	Moota, A595 Bothel	Cumbria
107	Penleigh Camp	Wells	Somerset
108	Thirkleby	Sandhill, Little Thirkleby, Thirsk	North Riding of Yorkshire
115	White Cross Camp	St Columb Major	Cornwall
116	High Hall Camp	Hatfield Heath, Epping	Essex
124	Ashton Gate Camp	Bedminster	Bristol
143	Carlton Hall	Carlton-in-Lindrick, Worksop	Nottinghamshire
165	Watten Camp	Thurso	Caithness
155	Hornby Hall Camp	Brougham, Penrith	Cumbria
174	Norton-Cuckney Camp	Norton, Mansfield	Nottinghamshire
181	Carburton Camp	Carburton, Worksop	Nottinghamshire
186	Berechurch Hall	Colchester	Essex
189	Dunham Massey	Bowdon, Altrincham	Greater Manchester
191	Crewe Hall	Crewe Hall, Crewe Green	Cheshire
198/11	Island Farm/Special Camp XI	Bridgend	Glamorgan
251	East Cams	Portchester Road, Fareham	Hampshire
254	Sutton Bridge Camp, Working Camp	Holbeach, Sutton Bridge	Lincolnshire
275/275a	Kinnell Camp	Friockheim	Forfar
280	North Lynn Farm Camp, Working Camp	King's Lynn	Norfolk
292	Kirmington		North Lincolnshire
294	Fisher's Camp	Thedden Grange, Bentworth, Alton	Hampshire
402	Southampton	Highfield, Southampton	Hampshire
403	Brockley Camp	Brockley, Bristol	Somerset
405	Barwick House	Barwick, Yeovil	Somerset
614	Stoneham Camp	Eastleigh	Hampshire
663	Park House Camp "A"	Shipton Bellinger, Tidworth	Hampshire
665	Cross Keys Camp	Norton Fitzwarren, Taunton	Somerset
666	Stoberry Park	Wells	Somerset
668	Aliwal Barracks	North Tidworth	Hampshire
669	West Ridge Gardens,	Greenford, West London	Middlesex
672	Popham	Micheldever, Winchester	Hampshire
675	Hiltingury Road	Chandler's Ford, Eastleigh	Hampshire
676	Puckride Camp	Fleet Road, Aldershot	Hampshire
693	Whitchurch	Andover	Hampshire
1000	Oakhangers Camp	Bordon, Farnham	Hampshire
1006	Willems Barracks	Aldershot	Hampshire
1019	Aldershot	Farnham	Hampshire
1020	Shooter's Hill	Shooter's Hill, Woolwich	London
TBA	St Erth Camp	St Erth	Cornwall
TBA	Pitmedden Camp	Pitmedden	Aberdeenshire
111	"Deer Park" Monymusk Camp	Kemnay	Aberdeenshire
TBA	Sandyhillock Camp	Elchies, Archiestown	Moray
TBA	Plymyard Camp	Eastham	Cheshire
