= Harperley POW Camp 93 =

World War 2 prisoner of war camp in England

Coordinates: 54°42′50.16″N 1°48′15.48″W

Harperley POW Camp 93 is a surviving purpose-built World War II Prisoner of War (PoW) camp built to accommodate up to 1,400 inmates at Fir Tree near Crook, County Durham in the northeast of England. A work camp for low risk PoWs, it was built on a hillside overlooking Weardale and across the valley from Hamsterley Forest. It was built, initially, in 1943 by Italian PoWs to similar plans of other existing Ministry of War Standard Camps of World War II in Britain and was typical of many military installations around the country. It is the main camp for a number of satellite camps, also numbered 93. Nearby Bishop Auckland used Harperley PoWs and Oaklands Emergency Hospital was another installation numbered Camp 93.

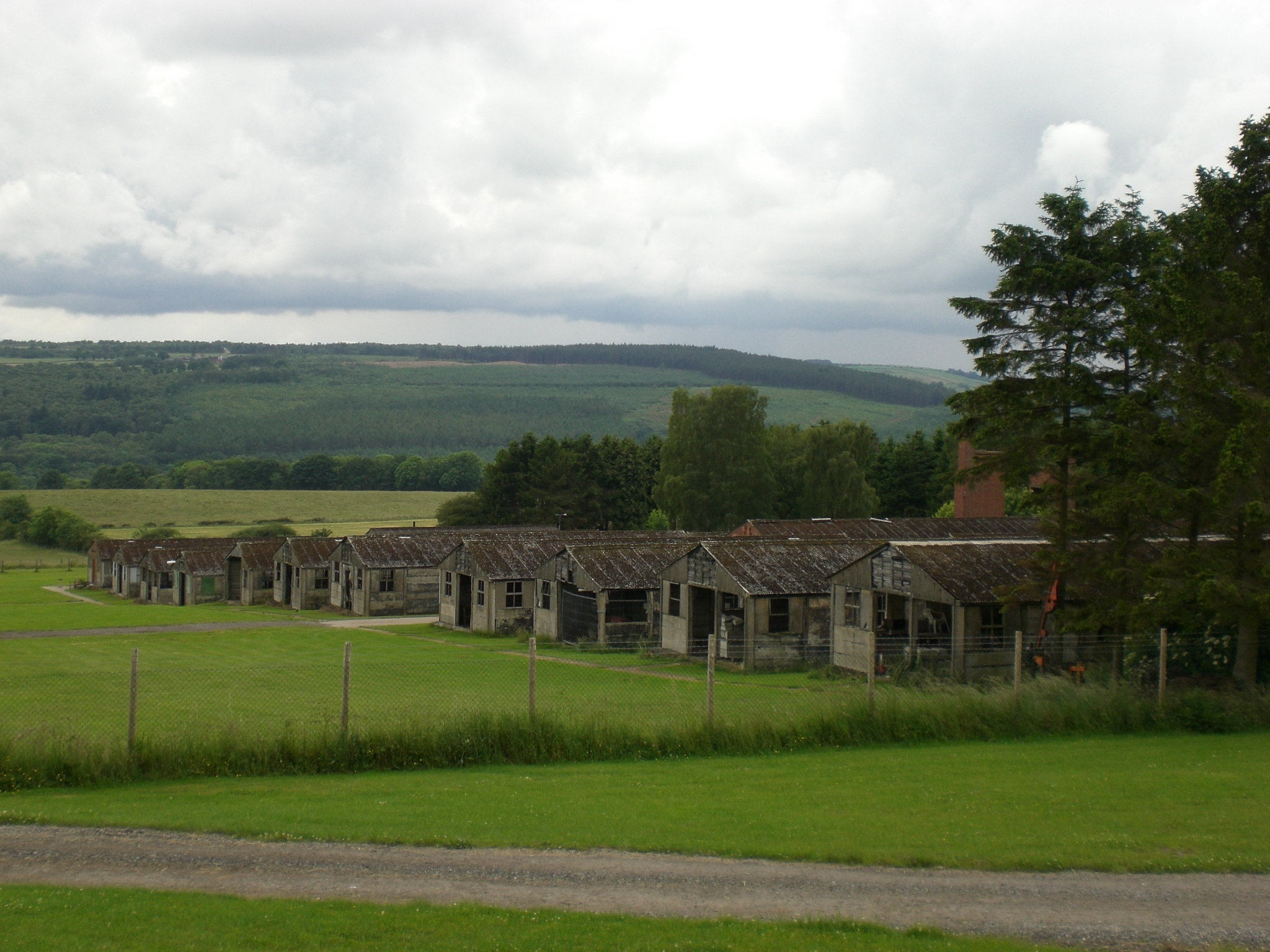
looking across PoW Camp 93 to Weardale

There were approximately 1,500 camps of varying categories and sizes in World War II Britain, and of those, about 100 were reported as 'purpose-built', such as Harperley.

== History ==
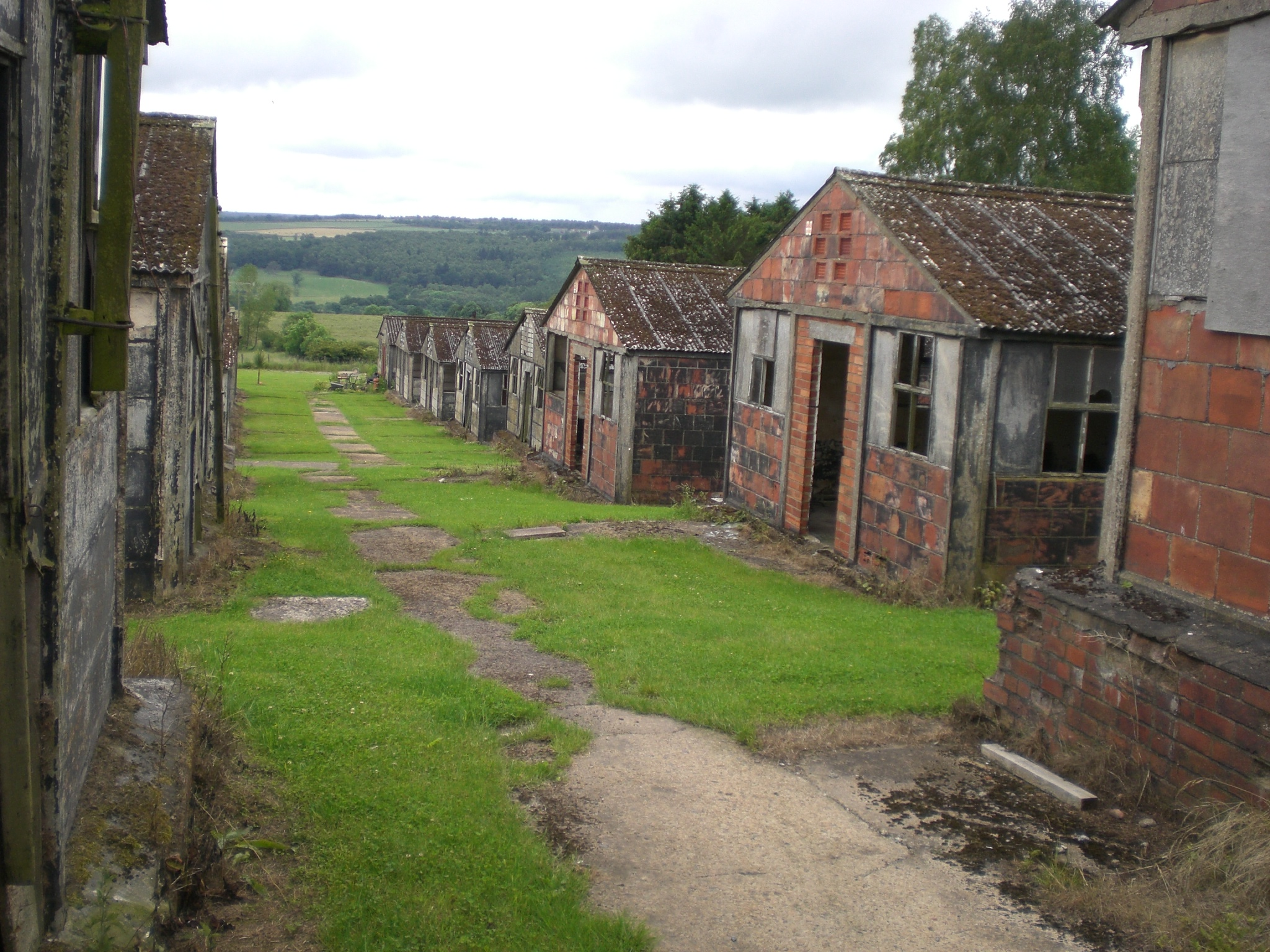
View from the southeast corner through the camp across Weardale

Camp Status	Camp Name	Location	World War II County
Headquarters	Harperley	Fir Tree, Crook	County Durham
Satellite	Oaklands Emergency Hospital	Bishop Auckland	County Durham
Satellite	Bedburn	Bedburn	County Durham
Satellite	Consett	Consett	County Durham
Satellite	Hamsterley Hall	Hamsterley, Rowlands Gill	County Durham
Satellite	High Spen	Gateshead	County Durham
Satellite	Lanchester	Lanchester	County Durham
Satellite	Langton Grange	High Hulam, Nr Staindrop	County Durham
Satellite	Mount Oswald	South Road, Durham	County Durham
Satellite	Usworth	nr Washington, Tyne and Wear	County Durham
Satellite	Windlestone Hall	Rushyford	County Durham

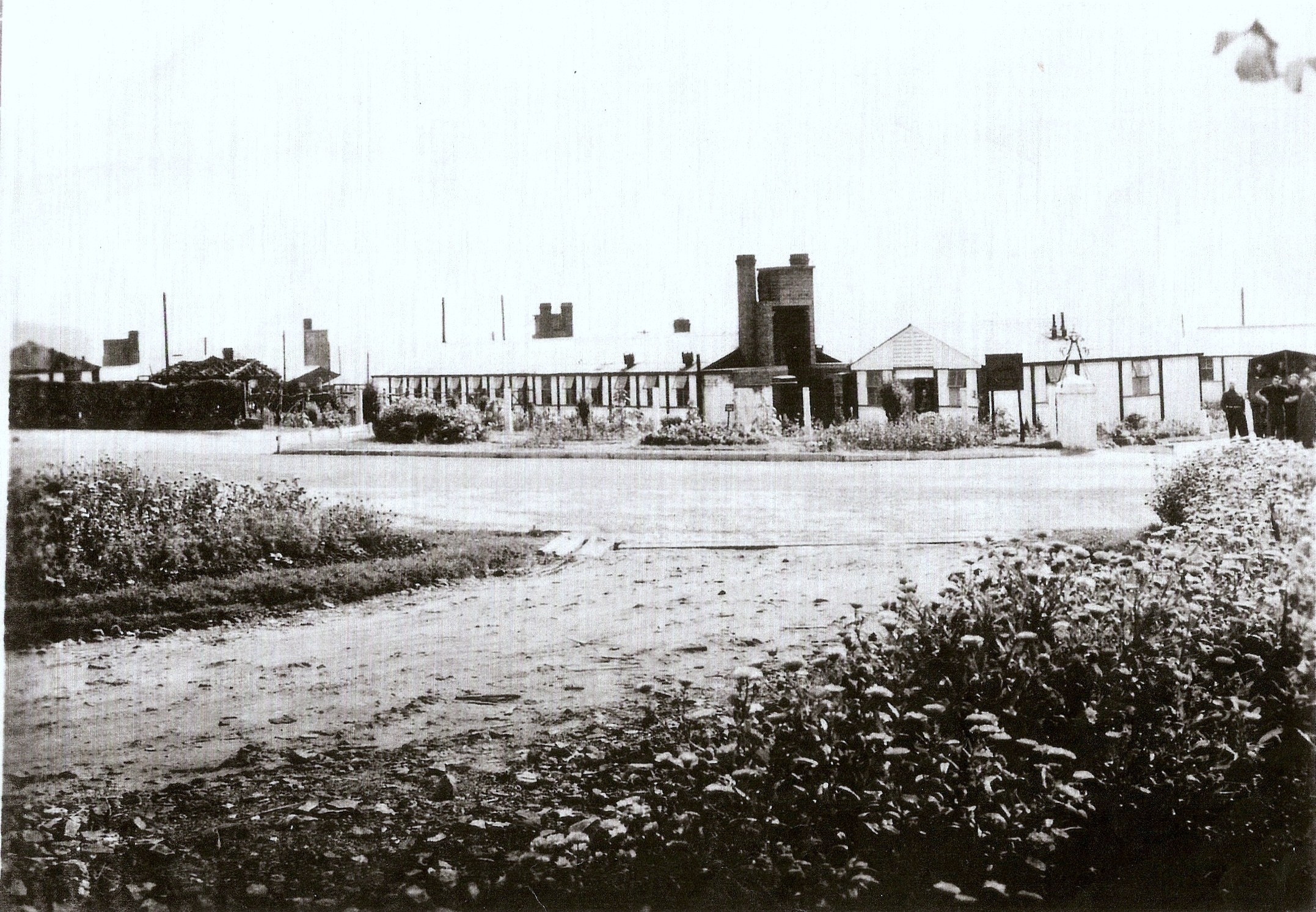
Harperley PoW Camp 93, Main Gate

The land was requisitioned from local landowner Charles Johnson, and then constructed on by the War Office and Italian PoWs who, on arrival, were initially housed in canvas bell tents.

The everyday running of the camp was conducted by the military staff. The first Commandant was Major Tetlow. His duties were mainly confined to the camp although his residence was in Wolsingham, the first village northwest of the camp on the main A689 road. A recent report from one of the British guards confirms frequent, but discreet, lunchtime visits to a local hostelry, 'The Duke of York' in Fir Tree with Major Tetlow and two other senior staff members.

Major Tetlow eventually retired to Wolsingham in Weardale in 1945, opening the door to his successor, the second and last Commandant, Lieutenant Colonel George Kinnear Stobart. He remained in command until the last repatriated PoW was released and the camp was officially disbanded in 1948.

Like many PoW Camps, after its 1948 closure it was known as a DP (Displaced Persons) Camp; in this case it was known as 'Fir Tree'. The satellite camp Hamsterley Hall became Hamsterley Hall DP Camp, housing about 300 to 400 men from as far away as the new East Germany (the Deutsche Demokratisches Republik or DDR), Poland, Ukraine, Latvia, Estonia and Lithuania, countries occupied by the then Soviet Union. If those men had returned home many may have ended up in Gulags or Siberian Labour Camps. Large numbers of DPs were allowed into Britain, primarily in 1947, provided they agreed to work for about four years in agriculture, on farms, or in the mines. Transport between the DP Camps and the farms was Government-provided, the camps being run by the YMCA (Young Men's Christian Association) movement. There were a large number of similar camps including, in this area, Fir Tree, Villa Real (Consett), Gainford near Darlington and Windlestone Hall three miles east of Bishop Auckland, also on the A689; the childhood home of the then future Prime Minister Sir Anthony Eden.

=== Construction ===
The original 50 plus buildings were constructed from normal house brick and concrete foundations with reinforced concrete posts and frameworks. All the buildings are of the same width, 18 ft 6 in (5.64 m), the approximate height being 12 ft (3.7 m) at the roof apex and of varying lengths dependent on the intended use of the building. The wall sections were either prefabricated reinforced concrete panels or vented square-shaped clay brick construction, including a window in alternate sections. The roofs were made from corrugated asbestos sheeting and are said to be currently in a stable condition. The original interior and exterior paintwork remain extensive throughout; their composition is reputed to have a high lead content (that is why guides always advise visitors to wash their hands thoroughly after each camp tour). All the buildings had two entry/exit points and were heated by one or two cast-iron pot-bellied stoves. Accommodation buildings are one room, approximately 60 ft (18 m) long, housing about 48 men in double bunks.

To this day, 49 buildings remain in varying states of decay and disrepair; the buildings were originally expected to last about 15 years. Harperley is reported to be one of only five PoW camps within Britain that remain virtually intact.

Camp 93 consisted of a Guards' compound and a Prisoners' compound with garden plots and a recreation area. An outer barbed wire fence supported by concrete posts enclosed the prisoners' compound, plus an alleged inner barbed wire coil fence. Between the Guards' and Prisoners' compounds, a sterile area was established between the inner fence with a further coiled barbed wire entanglement. Contrary to popular belief, there were no guard towers at Harperley, as prisoners held there were considered low risk 'White' category PoWs. The overall Allied categorisation of PoWs resulted in White (Non Nazi/Low risk), Grey (Medium risk) and Black (Staunch Nazi/High risk) internees. Prisoners within wartime Britain who were loyal Nazi supporters, such as members of the SS and U-boat (Unterseeboot) crews could be sent to camps in particularly remote locations such as the Scottish Highlands.

The complex was accessed from the A689 public highway via a single-track concrete road.

The prisoners' compound occupied a large square of land and contained approximately 41 huts including kitchens, adjacent grocery and produce store, two interconnecting dining huts, ablution and latrine blocks, the camp reception station (or medical facility), a number of accommodation huts, one hut that was converted into a chapel, another which became a theatre and a carpenter's hut.

Shortly after completion of the construction of the camp and Italy's capitulation, (which was signed on 3 September and publicly declared on 8 September 1943); the Italians were largely relocated to other PoW camps pending repatriation. Some stayed as PoWs incarcerated at Consett (a Camp 93 satellite) and remained employed as local labour. German PoWs were transported to Harperley, primarily after D-Day (6 June 1944), by various means, to replace its complement of Italian PoWs who were previously an invaluable contribution to the local labour force.

== Guards' Compound ==
The Guards' compound consisted of a group of approximately 16 huts. The maingate entrance and Guard Room was manned by British military personnel controlling the movements of everything in and out of the camp area, including personnel, prisoners and vehicles. Directly opposite the Guard Room at the main entrance was an Alarm Bell installed for any emergency, such as fire, escape attempts or PoW disturbances. It never seems to have been used other than as a highly polished and decorative addition to the well kept surrounding gardens.

Immediately to the right of the entrance were the Durham County War Agricultural Committee (D.W.A.C. or WARAG) office buildings and staffed by Durham County Council WARAG employees. These officers would negotiate with local farmers and landowners short and long-term contracts for employing PoWs on a daily basis. Each morning the PoWs were transported to their respective locations and returned each evening by the same method. Occasionally, farmers and landowners would request to billet a PoW, taking responsibility for their general welfare and employment for a particular period.

== Prisoners' Compound ==
=== General Description ===
Harperley held approximately 800 to 1,500 PoWs, all Junior Ranks and Senior NCOs; they were utilised extensively as manpower to work on agriculture, dam, forestry and many other local labour-intensive projects. Six days a week, Monday to Saturday from 0700 hrs to 1900 hrs. Counted out, frequently transported to their workplace (although they sometimes moved on foot), and upon their return, counted in. Proceeding through the only entrance and exit, their 'reward' being ...their personal gift from King George VI, three horrible cigarettes, as quoted by Johannes Heerdegen in his award-winning DVD documentary Journey into the Past.

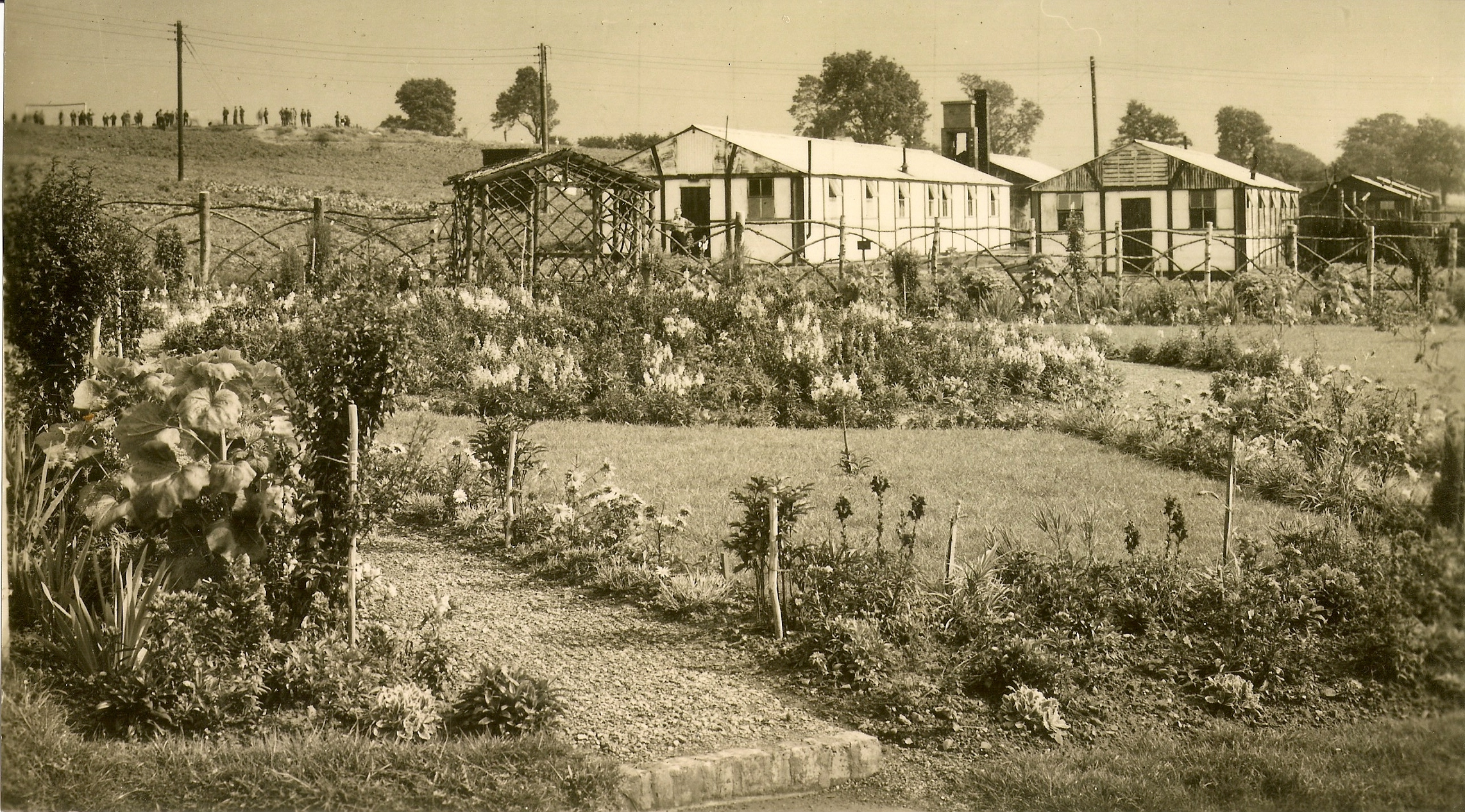
Harperley PoW Camp 93, Garden

Wherever they worked, their employers paid WARAG for their services. However, PoWs received only approximately 5% of that fee, dependent on their skills, anything from 6d to 6/- a week (2 1/2p to 30p). Surviving PoW Reinhardt Nieke reported in 2005, as a PoW he frequently spent his wages on things such as ...a slice of fruit cake and a bottle of pop. Regulations forbade PoWs from holding on to cash and their remaining 'wages' were placed within a central Welfare fund to be banked and administered by the Camp Adjutant, in liaison with the PoW Camp Committee, from which they collectively benefited.
Not all PoWs worked off-camp, there were a number of roles to be fulfilled within the PoW compound and the British lines within the various Mess buildings and offices.

The adjacent photograph shows the ornamental gardens to the northern end of the British Junior Ranks' accommodation buildings (painted white), the PoW lines beyond them (painted black with pitch to help with waterproofing). The WO's & Sgt's Mess is out of shot to the right of the photograph. Notice the spectators on the hill top watching an ongoing football match. It is fondly believed locally that, as West Auckland FC won the Sir Thomas Lipton Trophy in Turin, Italy by beating FC Winterthur 2 – 0 in 1909 and successfully defended it against Juventus 1 – 6, again in Turin, in 1911, the 1st post-World War II England v Germany football match was allegedly played at Harperley between Crook Town and the PoWs.
Contrary to popular belief, the ex-paratrooper and Manchester City goalkeeper Bert Trautmann OBE, was never incarcerated in Harperley.

=== Parade Ground ===
The parade ground is situated between the inner gate and spans approximately 2/3 the width of the PoW compound in a southerly direction. On the eastern side is the first building, the Camp Committee hut, and running south, the Kitchen (Küche) then the Canteen (Kantine). The PoW Parade Ground ends at the last row of accommodation buildings.

To the west, the first building is the Reception/Medical Centre (a complex of three interlinked buildings), and running south, the Showers (Duschraum), one of the largest buildings within PoW Camp 93. The Parade Ground ends at the last row of accommodation buildings, as it corresponds with the eastern side.

=== Canteen ===
The Canteen (Kantine). The PoWs regularly congregated here to play cards, read or write letters, read newspapers (both English and German); they also extended their education, in particular, by learning English or maybe just relaxing and whiling away the rest of their available free time.

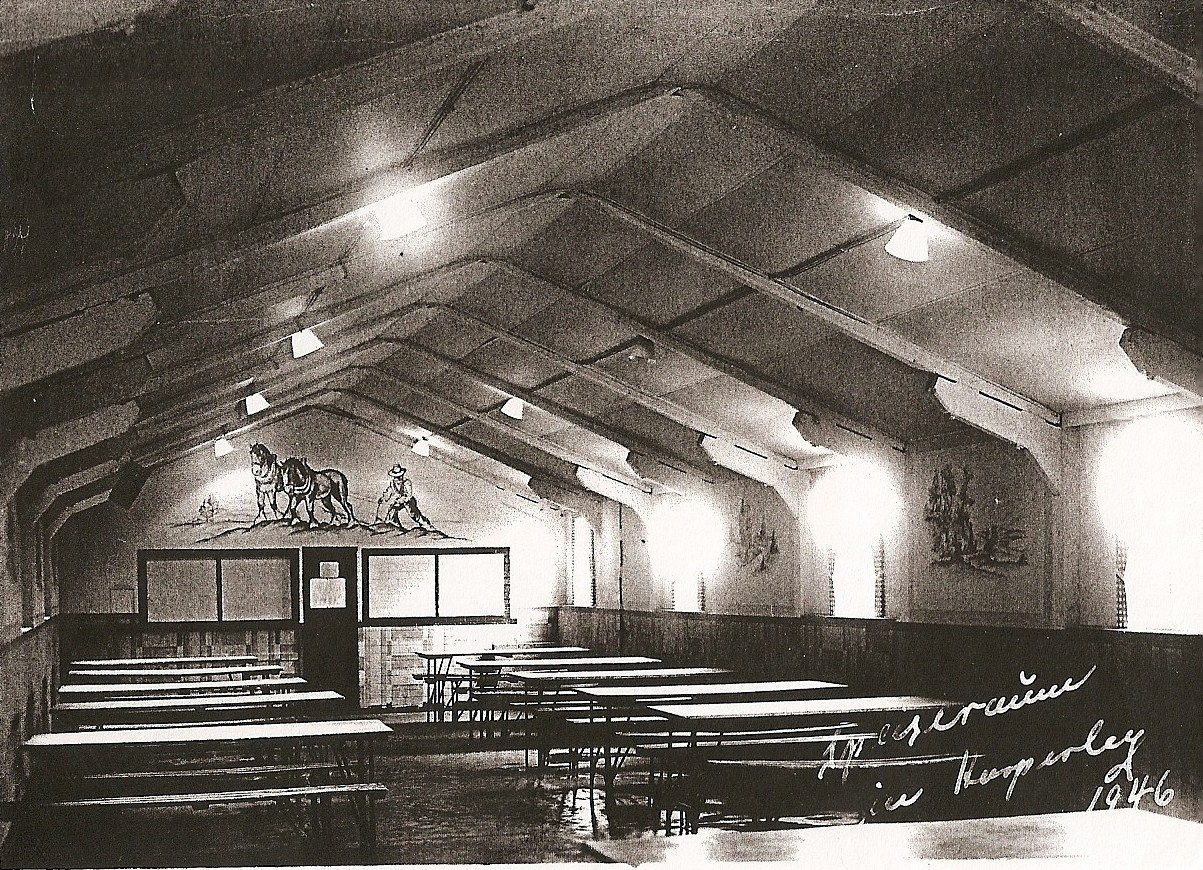
The canteen in 1946

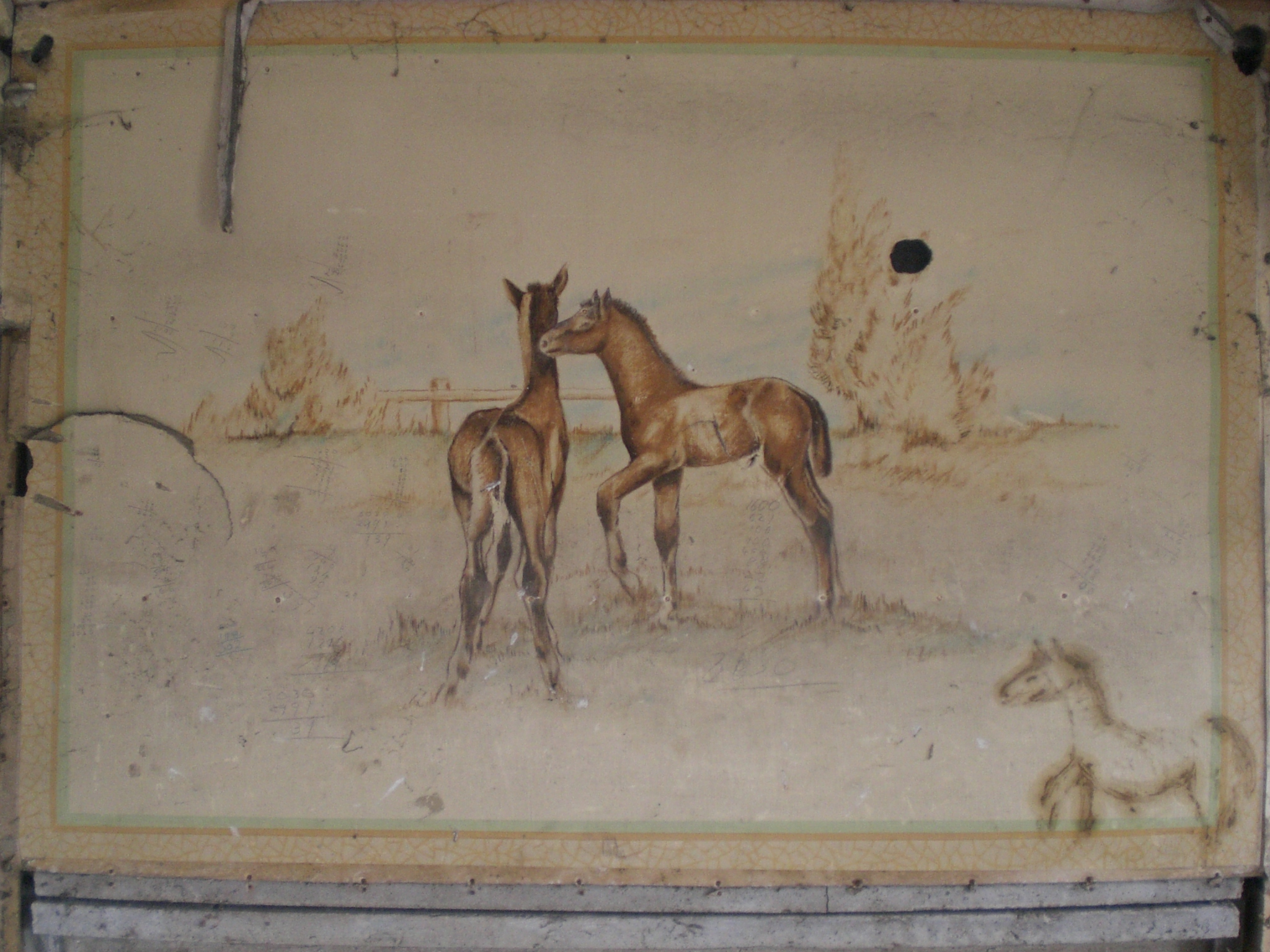
'Foals in the Meadow'

The canteen walls retain murals drawn and painted directly onto fibreboard panels covering the concrete structure. The windows feature hardboard pelmets and decorative surrounds mounted on lath framing, constructed by the prisoners using repurposed materials.

The current owners, Lisa and James Macleod, state that the murals appear to be the work of only one of Harperley's German interns whose identity currently remains unknown, save for his disguised initials, M R, in the English-titled 'Foals in the Meadow', which can be seen in the bottom right corner.

=== Theatre ===
Structurally, this building is no different from the others within Harperley. However, its interior, constructed entirely by the PoWs, is a remarkable achievement. It shows the successfully converted interior of a MoW (Ministry of War) Standard Hut incorporating a Stage (with Prompt Box and Orchestra Pit) and tiered auditorium flooring. It is believed none of the materials were requisitioned or issued to them and it is possible that the bricks, sand, cement and gravel were 'acquired' almost certainly 'on permanent loan'. It was decorated in the style of the day using painted Hessian sacking with accompanying adapted wall lighting. The facia above the stage was adorned with theatrical masks and scroll work fabricated from papier-mâché and coated in gold paint 'donated' by the last Commandant, Lieutenant Colonel George Kinnear Stobart.
("Donated" is used as it is unsure how he came to be in possession of the gold paint).

The PoWs were very talented and most of the productions were written by themselves. There were no women so female characters had to be played by the prisoners using donated and re-tailored costumes and dresses. Most wigs were fabricated from Hessian sacking with the threads and fibres gently teased apart and fashioned in the styles of the day, bleached and dyed as required. Allegedly, Marlene Dietrich and Betty Grable, amongst many others, have 'trod the boards' at Harperley Camp.
The eight to 11 piece Camp Orchestra played music they knew and frequently wrote their own compositions. Instruments were either donated or bought using PoW monies from their Central Fund. Incidentally, on viewing the size of the orchestra pit, one is unsure how eight to 11 prisoners, seating, music stands and instruments (including a double bass and drum kit), were accommodated.

Harperley's Camp Orchestra played at many local functions aided by their musical director, PoW Helmut Entz (in his previous civilian life he was a professional musician).

It is hoped to restore and return the theatre to the community, not just to Drama and Theatre groups, but also to schools and colleges. To rededicate it for the use it was given all those years ago by the German PoWs. Many school and college groups have already expressed an interest in showing possible future productions.

If and when restoration commences, it has been suggested that encasing one of the old interior panels in perspex would display the deplorable condition the hut was found in prior to restoration.

In its heyday, in 1940s wartime Britain, it was not just a popular venue for the PoWs, but also for invited Guards, Officers and the local community as well. Performances in the theatre are fondly remembered by now elderly audience participants who were children then. Some programmes from performances in the theatre survive.

=== South Perimeter Fence ===
Harperley was a working camp and that work was long and hard. At the end of World War II most German PoWs were repatriated. However, throughout the UK, approximately one in 16 PoWs remained, men such as Rudi Lux. Prisoners that chose to remain in the United Kingdom had to report weekly to the local police station as a 'displaced' person until as recently as 1961.

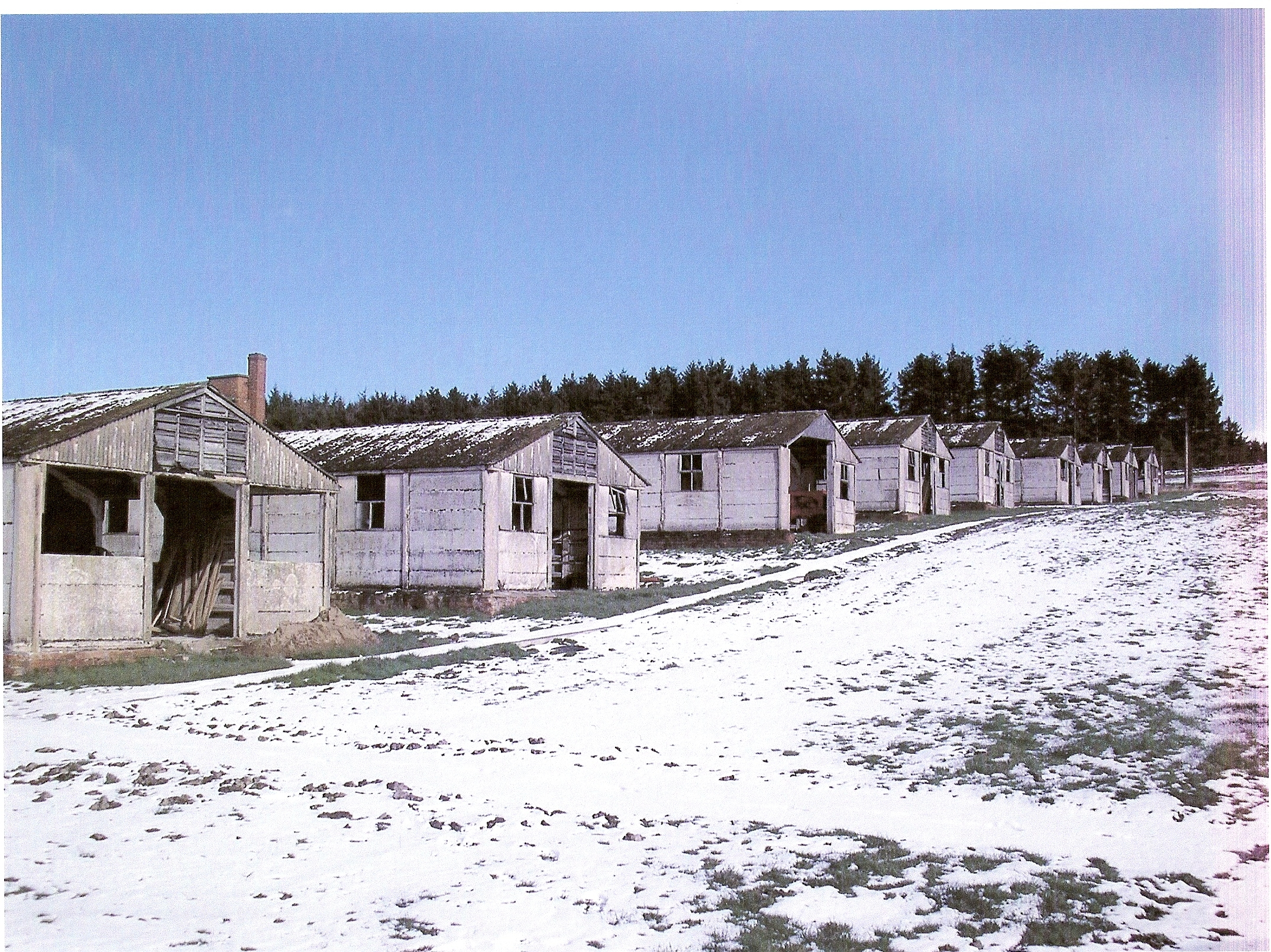
Southeast section of remaining huts

Visitors to Harperley envisage its future as another Eden Camp. It is not the vision of current owners James and Lisa MacLeod and not what they wish to portray. Eden Camp, No. 83 and 250, is an interactive museum and excels at what it does – depicting their theme, the Peoples' War 1939 – 1945. The MacLeods and Harperley would like to eventually depict what life was like as a prisoner of war. Camp 93 is frequently visited by ex-PoWs and their families. Many are emotional as their memories rush back.

The perimeter wire was removed after war's end due to a War Office directive. All that remains are the still visible half posts with barbed wire still attached at the southern end of the PoW compound.

Rumours abound from ex-Guards, ex-PoWs and local residents alike, claiming the fence was not there to keep the PoWs in but to keep the girls out! A number of local girls courted beaus from Harperley.

== Recent history ==
=== 2001 ===
James and Lisa MacLeod purchased Harperley late in 2001. The camp was overgrown and has since been cleared of extensive weeds and undergrowth. Funding was obtained from Defra (Department for Environment, Food and Rural Affairs), to help refurbish the interiors of the British Guards accommodation. The old WO's and Sgt's Mess (Warrant Officers and Sergeants) was transformed into the Der Quell Restaurant and Tea Rooms.

The PoW compound was envisaged as another project to store plant and farm machinery and as a possible poultry farm until the MacLeods interest grew from the sights and the buildings they uncovered.
Upon clearing the site and the discovery of the extensive plot of buildings and artefacts within them, the MacLeods placed a newspaper advertisement asking for help in tracing information relating to Harperley. The response to that advert from ex-PoWs, ex-Guards and locals alike would spark an idea into resurrecting Camp 93. One ex-PoW in particular, Rudi Lux, played a prominent role.

Rudi Lux, who had served in the Volksturm, was captured by the Americans and arrived in Harperley in 1946. He was unable to return to his home town as it was now under communist control. He eventually married and settled locally. Until 1961, he reported weekly to his local Police Station as a Displaced Person and, because he was deemed a security risk, allowed only menial employment.
By Christmas 2003 Rudi had been diagnosed with a terminal illness from which he died in 2004. At his family's request his ashes are scattered in Camp 93's Rose Garden, dedicated to his memory. Rudi also wrote and published a book, From Pomerania to Ponteland, which details his life and experiences.

=== 2011 ===
From BBC News:Crumbling Harperley PoW camp gets £500,000

...is to undergo repairs thanks to a donation of £500,000. English Heritage is spending the money on the canteen and theatre at Harperley POW Camp 93 near Crook, County Durham. Two years ago the camp's owners put it up for sale on eBay for £900,000, but did not receive a single bid. Now English Heritage is hoping to save the camp and will carry out repairs at the site over two years. It is hoped it will become a tourist attraction.

=== 2012 ===
From The Northern Echo online pages, 8:00am Monday 2 January 2012: Grant to protect POW camp

A Canteen and theatre built by prisoners of war at a camp will be better protected from the elements thanks to a £500,000 grant.

From BBC News online pages, 17:26 Monday 30 January 2012: Harperley PoW camp owners' hope for investor

When foot-and-mouth disease wiped out their herd of pedigree Highland cattle, Lisa and James MacLeod decided it was time to turn their hands to something completely different...

=== 2014 ===
Durham County Council received two planning applications for the site in June. The site's owner James MacLeod requested permission to turn four of the huts into homes for his family. Simon Raine wished to turn hut 16 into a cheese making factory. Raine stated that this would have continued a tradition of food production at the site. Planning permission was granted to Raine in August.
