= Pingley POW Camp =

Historic Prisoner of War Camp

Coordinates: 53.5493°N 0.4653°W

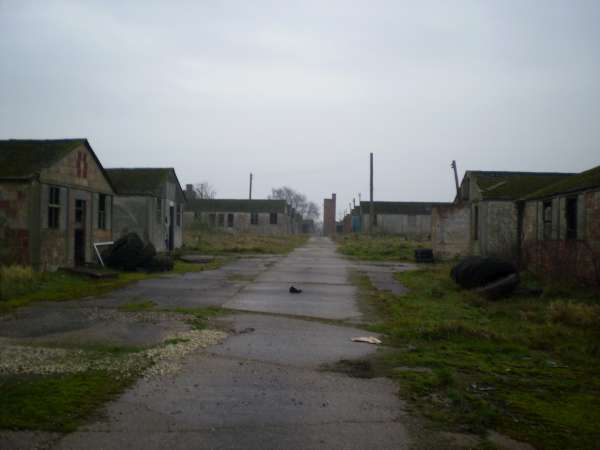
Photograph showing the main dividing road of the camp from the front

Pingley POW (prisoner of war) camp is one of the few remaining POW camps in the United Kingdom in good condition. Unlike the nearby Eden Camp which is preserved as a Second World War museum, Pingley Camp lies in a semi derelict state in the grounds of Pingley Farm. It is situated on the outskirts of Brigg, Lincolnshire.

The camp was used to house mainly Italian prisoners of war, though Germans were also held there. After the war the camp was used as an emergency sheltered housing under the name Pingley Farm Hostel. The original buildings used (and constructed) by the prisoners are situated towards the rear of the site entrance and remain in bad condition. The brick buildings at the front of the site are in fairly good condition, and have post war modifications dating from around 1950–1980.

The camp has been demolished as of January 2009, and the site was redeveloped as housing.

The area has been developed with ten luxury executive houses and is now known as the Pingley Park estate. The first was started in July 2010.
