= Ranfurly, Renfrewshire =

Coordinates: 55.849°N 4.585°W

Ranfurly: Scottish Gaelic: Rann Feòirling
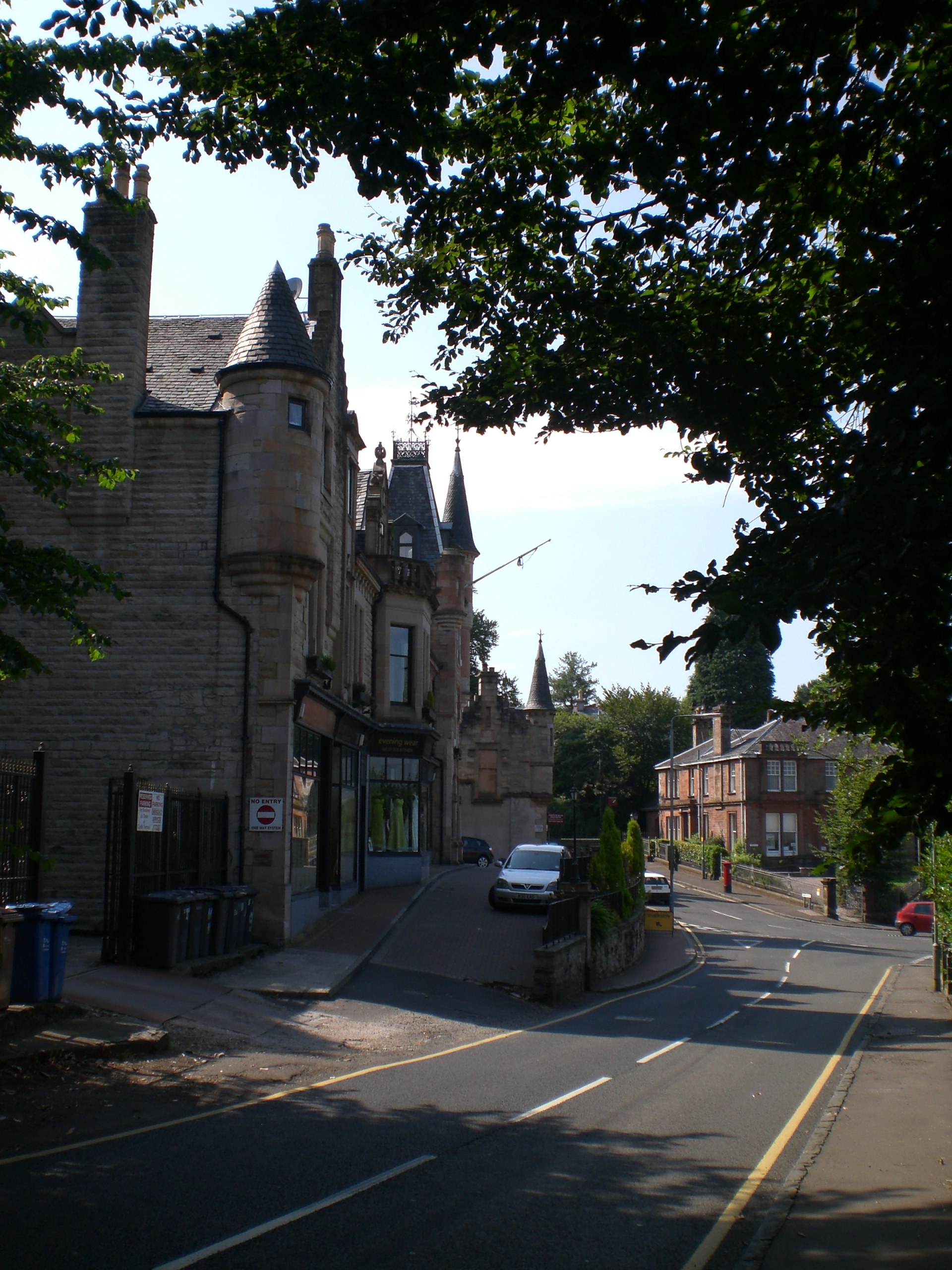
- Castle Terrace, the former Ranfurly Hotel, from the Churchyard

- Location within Renfrewshire
- OS grid reference: NS391647
- Civil parish: Kilbarchan
- Council area: Renfrewshire
- Lieutenancy area: Renfrewshire
- Country: Scotland
- Sovereign state: United Kingdom
- Post town: BRIDGE OF WEIR
- Postcode district: PA11
- Dialling code: 01505
- Police: Scotland
- Fire: Scottish
- Ambulance: Scottish
- UK Parliament: Paisley and Renfrewshire North
- Scottish Parliament: Renfrewshire North and West

Ranfurly (Scottish Gaelic: Rann Feòirling) is a small settlement on the southern edge of the village of Bridge of Weir, which lies within the Gryffe Valley in the council area and historic county of Renfrewshire in the West-Central Lowlands of Scotland.

Ranfurly derives its name from the 15th century Ranfurly Castle situated there. The area became a dormitory settlement of residential housing in the Victorian Era. Today Ranfurly is a conservation area.

== History ==
=== Ranfurly Castle ===
Ranfurly Castle was constructed around 1440 by the Knox family who, in the 19th century, took the title of Earl of Ranfurly in the Peerage of Ireland. The building was three stories high and the remains of the Castle are located in the grounds of the Old Course Ranfurly Golf Club. In 1665 it was sold to the Cochrane Earls of Dundonald, later it was sold to the Hamiltons of Holmhead, then to the Aitkenheads.

=== Victorian settlement ===
The settlement of Ranfurly originated primarily in the 1880s to 1910s, with quality stone-built houses and some fine villas in the higher land above the village following the expansion of the area and the arrival of the railway in Bridge of Weir in 1864.

Significant in the area was the Ranfurly Hotel which was built in 1882 in the Scots Baronial style, designed by architect Robert Raeburn for the Bonar family of Ranfurly estate and an extension designed by James Miller. It was closed as a hotel prior to the First World War and seen a number of uses since.

The Eastwing of Castle Terrace was severely damaged in a fire during the 1990’s and demolished in the mid 90’s. The rest of Castle Terrace was refurbished, which included seven flats and seven shops. The luxury flats were refurbished to a high standard, including designer kitchens, Jacuzzi baths, pine-lined sauna, mod cons and private parking.

== Governance ==
Ranfurly is part of Bridge of Weir for local government purposes, which is in turn part of the council area of Renfrewshire, as well the historic county of Renfrewshire which has wider boundaries and retains some official functions, for example as a registration county and lieutenancy area.

For elections to Renfrewshire Council, Bridge of Weir is part of ward 11, named 'Bishopton, Bridge of Weir and Langbank', which elects three of Renfrewshire's forty three councillors.

Bridge of Weir is also one of Renfrewshire's twenty-seven community council areas, which represents the Ranfurly area. Historically, Bridge of Weir was split between the civil parishes of Houston and Kilellan and Kilbarchan, with Ranfurly falling into the latter.

== Religion ==
The former Ranfurly Church merged with St Machar's Church, also in the area, to form the Ranfurly St Machar Church in 1968 within the Church of Scotland. The latter church building, constructed in 1878 in the Gothic Revival style, is now used by the joint congregation. The former Ranfurly Church has been converted into private residences.

St Machar's, and later St Machar's Ranfurly, has been the historical parish church of Bridge of Weir since the area's elevation to a quoad sacra parish in 1887.
