= James Walker (chemist) =

Scottish chemist

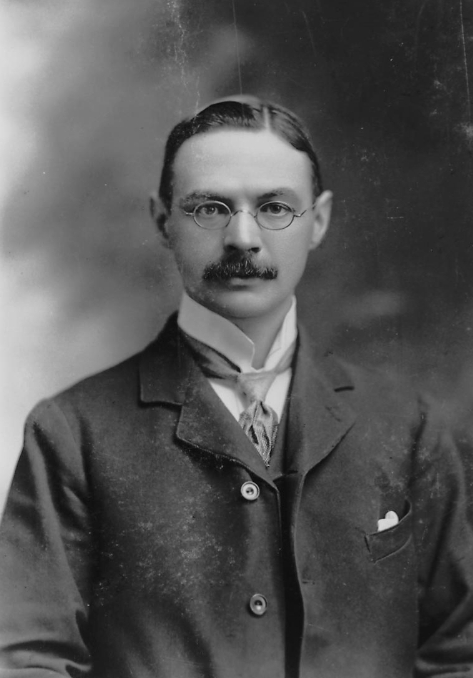
c. 1900

Sir James Walker FRS FRSE FCS LLD (6 April 1863 – 6 May 1935) was a Scottish chemist. He worked mainly on inorganic and physical chemistry. His major contribution was in the study of chemical reaction kinetics based on a study of the reactions converting ammonium cyanate to urea which was published in 1895 along with Frederick J. Hambly (1878-1960).

== Life ==
Walker was born at Logie House, in north-west Dundee the son of James Walker of J & H Walker, jute and flax spinners and weavers, and owners of the Dura Works. His mother was Susan Hutchison Cairns.

He was educated at the High School of Dundee, and attended some evening science classes by Frank W. Young. He had passed the entrance examination for the University of St Andrews, but instead joined his father's company. He stayed there for three years, then entered the University of Edinburgh to study sciences in 1882. Here he was inspired by Crum Brown's lectures in organic chemistry. He graduated with a BSc in 1885 and studied under Thomas Carnelley and wrote a thesis on the dehydration of metallic hydroxides by heat for which gained a doctorate in 1886. He worked as a demonstrator in 1886-86 and then spent three years in Germany, working with Ludwig Claisen, Adolf von Baeyer and Wilhelm Ostwald. Following Ostwald he joined the University of Leipzig and worked on affinity (disassociation) constants for which he received a PhD in 1889, he returned to Britain, working in Edinburgh and University College, London, before being appointed professor of chemistry at the University College, Dundee in 1894.

In 1890 he was elected a Fellow of the Royal Society of Edinburgh. His proposers were Alexander Crum Brown, John Gibson, Leonard Dobbin and Ralph Stockman. He was an active member of the Society serving many years as a Councillor and Vice President from 1916 to 1919. He won their Makdougall-Brisbane Prize for 1892-1894 and the Gunning Victoria Jubilee Prize for 1928 to 1932.

In 1908 he returned to Edinburgh to succeed Alexander Crum Brown as professor of Chemistry at the University of Edinburgh. He resided at 5 Wester Coates Road.

Walker's main research interest was in physical chemistry. He investigated methods of electrolysis in the synthesis of dicarboxylic acids, the dissociation constants of acids and bases, and measured molecular weights by freezing point depression. While he is personally credited with no truly major discoveries, his most important role was as a populariser of the new and controversial physical chemistry theories of Ostwald, van't Hoff and Arrhenius in the English speaking world. This he did through his 1890 translation of Ostwald's Grundriss der allgemeinen Chemie (Outlines of General Chemistry), and his own textbook Introduction to Physical Chemistry (1899), which became a set text in many British universities.

During the First World War he oversaw the production of explosives on a remote site at Roslin south of Edinburgh. He was President of the Chemical Society 1921/23. Walker was elected a Fellow of the Royal Society in 1900, and was awarded a Davy Medal in 1926. He was knighted by King George V in 1921. He retired in 1928 and died in Edinburgh on 6 May 1935.

== Family ==
In 1897 he married Annie Purcell Sedgwick (1871–1950), also a chemist, who graduated from the science tripos at Girton College, Cambridge in 1893. In that year, she was a research student under Norman Collie at University College, London, where she met Walker. From 1895 to 1897, she was assistant to Ida Freund and Resident Lecturer in Natural Science at Newnham College, Cambridge. She then worked as an assistant in physiology at the Balfour Biological Laboratory for Women from 1897–8. After their marriage, she co-authored a paper on tetraethylsuccinic acid with Walker. They were parents to the geologist Frederick Walker FRSE (1898-1968).
