= Dunham Massey POW Camp =

Coordinates: 53°23′06″N 2°22′32″W

Dunham Massey POW Camp was a POW camp detaining German prisoners of war. It was located in the eastern corner of Dunham Massey Home Park in an area which by the 21st century had been repurposed as a golf course and housing. Initially constructed for US Army troops, in November 1944 it began its new use and by the end of the war it held approximately 6,000 prisoners in 220 buildings.

== See also ==
- Bowdon, Greater Manchester
- List of World War II prisoner-of-war camps in the United Kingdom
