= Robert Reid Raeburn =

Scottish architect (1819–1888)

Robert Reid Raeburn (4 August 1819 – 7 February 1888) was a Scottish architect in the mid-19th century operating primarily in and around Edinburgh.

== Life ==
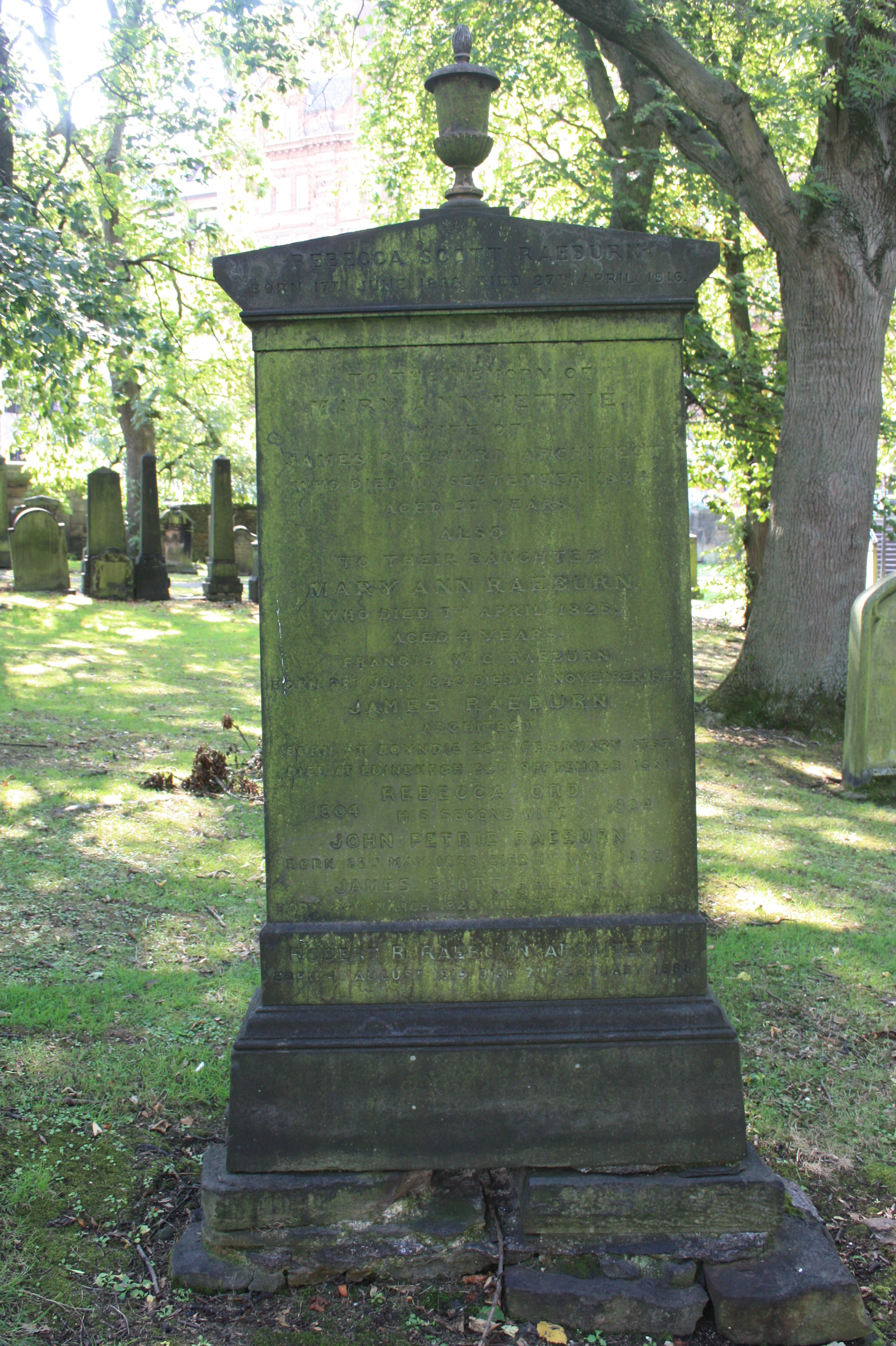
The grave of Robert Reid Raeburn, St Cuthberts, Edinburgh

He was born on 4 August 1819 the son of James Raeburn (1787–1851), architect and principal clerk to the Scottish Office of Works, and Mary Ann Petrie. He was named after his father’s employer, Robert Reid.

In early life the family moved to a fine newly built townhouse at 7 North East Circus Place, ironically designed by rival architect William Henry Playfair.

He was apprenticed from 1835 until 1841 to Thomas Brown, architect for the Prison Board of Scotland. He worked here until the death of his father at which point he took his father’s role.

In 1837 he unsuccessfully submitted an entry for the monument to John Knox at the Glasgow Necropolis and in 1838 an equally unsuccessful bid to design the Scott Monument.

From 1841 Robert took over the work from his father, who had then retired, as Clerk of Works for government schemes. During this time he operated initially from his father’s house a 3 Warriston Place then moved to 4 Warriston Crescent. During this period he contributed greatly to civic improvements in the city, overseeing the redesign of North Bridge, and remodelling of Parliament Square. In 1865 he moved to new offices in Pitt Street (now renamed Dublin Street).

In 1843 he, and his family, left the established Church of Scotland and joined the Free Church of Scotland. This led to his involvement in the new headquarters for the Free Church Offices on the Mound.

In 1858 he was commissioned to lay out the Grange area for villa development on the south side of Edinburgh, revising a previous plan created by David Cousin. He then began to receive commissions for individual houses within this area. In 1864 he received a further commission to extend the Grange following its quick success, and in 1877 this was extended to what is now Grange Loan.

Reid never married. In his final years he lived and worked at 44 Charlotte Square. He died on 7 February 1888 and was buried with his parents in St Cuthbert’s Churchyard at the west end of Princes Street. The grave lies in the south-west section around 10 metres from the main west approach path.

== Works ==
- Feuing of the Grange for villa development in Edinburgh (1858)
- 35 Lauder Road, Grange, Edinburgh (1860)
- Dunard, 123 Grange Loan (1865)
- Roseburn Free Church, West Coates (1867) (now the National Bible Society of Scotland)
- United Presbyterian Church, North Berwick (now the Abbey Church of Scotland) (1868)
- Idvies House, Angus (1868)
- Ashbrook, 492 Ferry Road, Edinburgh (1869)
- Remodelling of 61/62 Princes Street to create Romanes & Paterson (1870)
- Tornaveen, 1 Gillsland Road, Edinburgh (1875)
- 11 Ettrick Road, Edinburgh (1875)
- Four terraces in the western Grange: 1–12 Greenhill Terrace; 1–20 Greenhill Place; 1–11 Strathearn Place; and 12–17 Strathearn Place (1877)
- Tenements with ground floor shops, 1–7 Grange Road/128-138 Causewayside (1877)
- York Buildings (opposite the Scottish National Portrait Gallery) (1878)
- Terraced houses, 1–18 Grange Terrace (1879)
- 9-11 Eyre Place (1880)
- Rosetta, 45 Inverleith Gardens (1880–2)
- Dalry Free Church (1881) demolished
- Ranfurly Hotel. Renfrewshire (1882)
- Gallatown Free Church, Kirkcaldy (1883)
- Fountainbridge Free Church (1887) demolished
- Curved corner infill block, 4–7 Canon Street (1887) wrongly attributed as Georgian in many sources
- Eyre Crescent (1887)
