= West Coates =

Suburb of Edinburgh, Scotland

Coordinates: 55°56′45.36″N 3°13′31.27″W

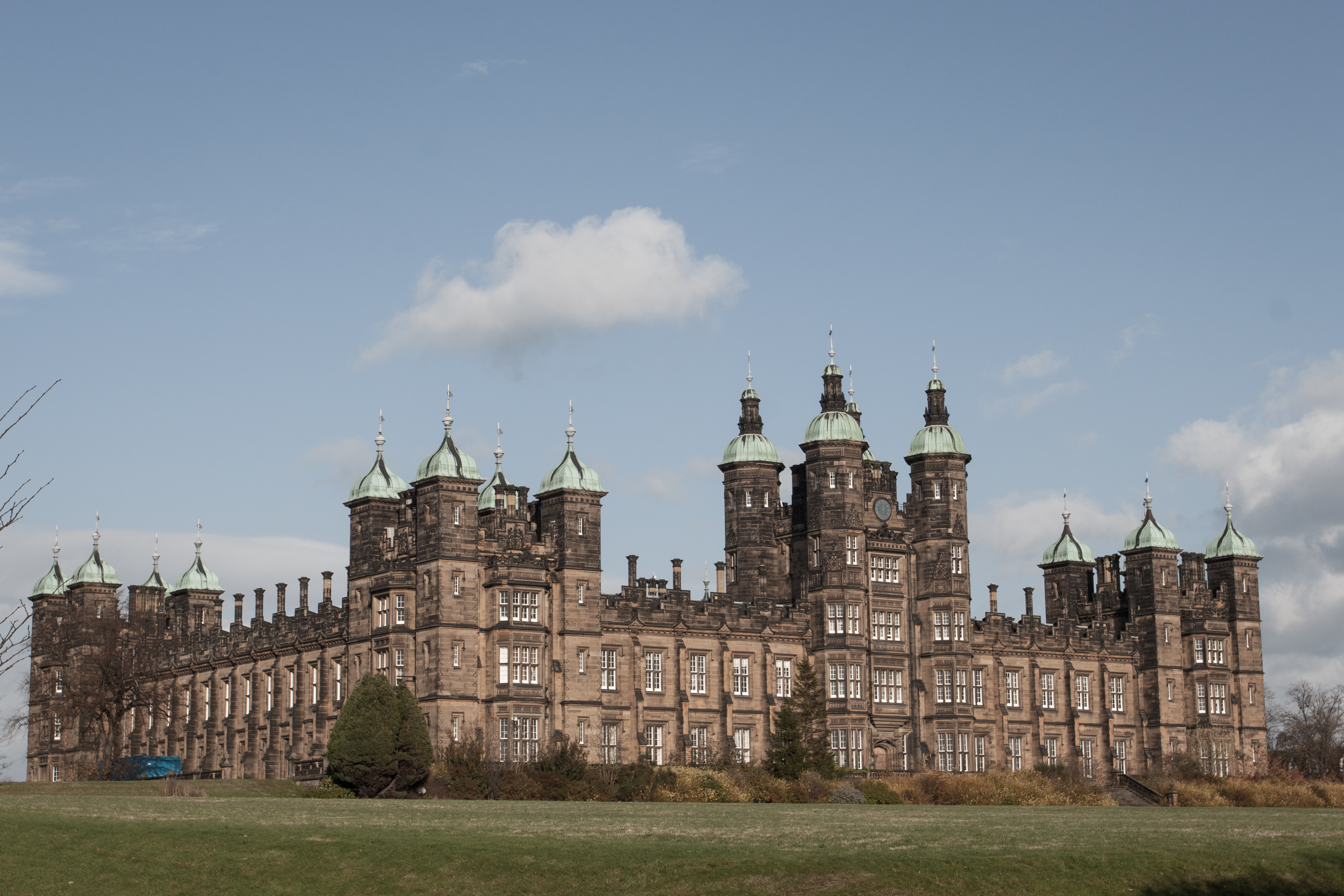
Donaldson's College

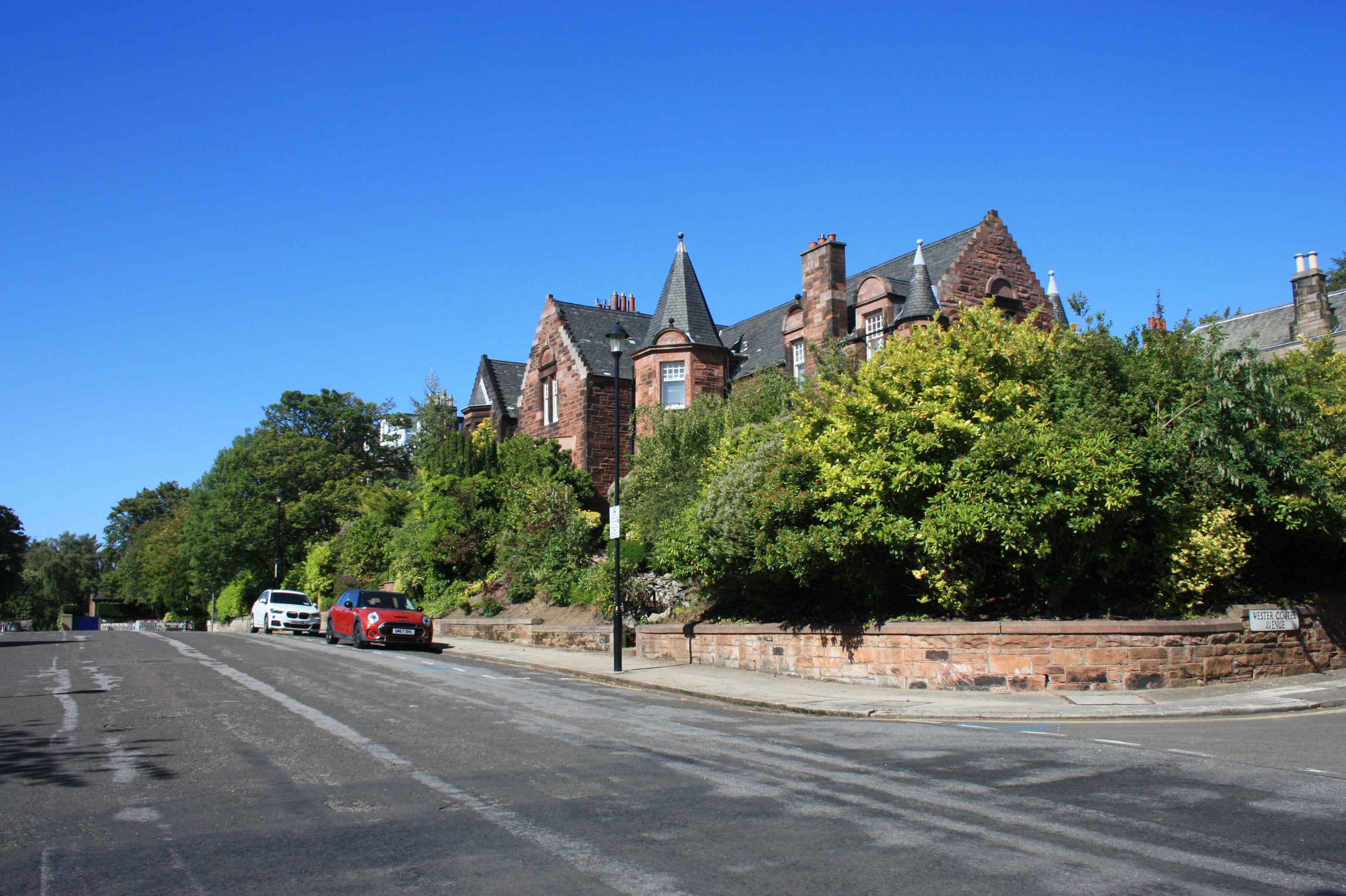
Redmount, 6 Wester Coates Road, Edinburgh

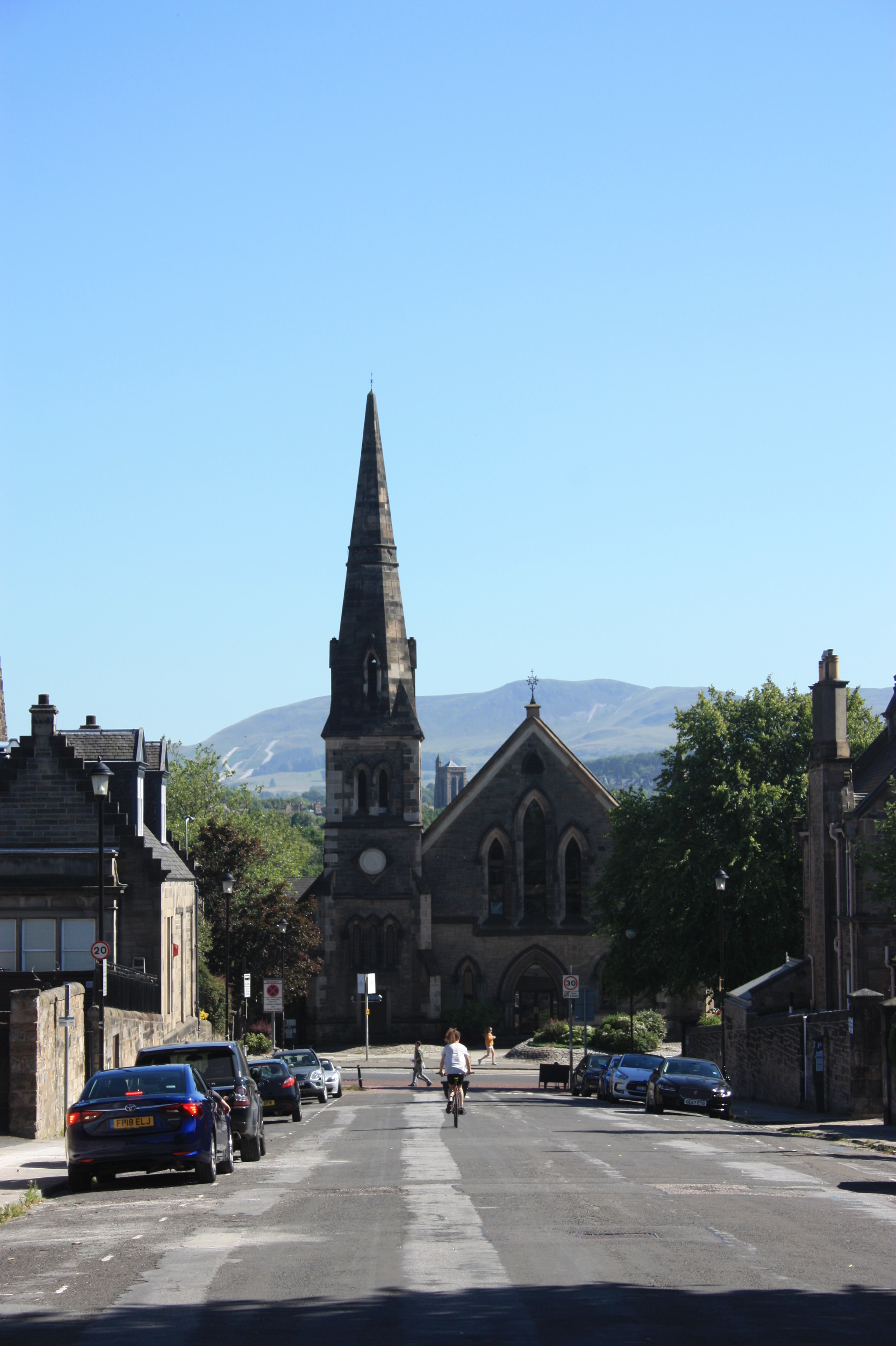
Roseburn Free Church with the Pentland Hills behind

West Coates or Wester Coates is a residential district of central Edinburgh, the capital of Scotland. It is on the A8, in proximity to Haymarket railway station and Roseburn, west of the city centre, bounded by the Water of Leith on its north side.

As well as numerous small hotels and bed and breakfast lodges, the area was home to Donaldson's College, a former school for the deaf.

The name derives from Coates Hall on Rosebery Crescent to the east.

The focal point in urban design terms is Roseburn Free Church on Hampton Terrace by Robert Reid Raeburn (1867) but this its impact is only appreciated from Wester Coates Road as (on the main road) it is visually overwhelmed by Donaldson's School. The character is very different north and south of the main road. To the north the area is laid out as large villas on spacious avenues. South of the main road (and the modest houses of Osborne Terrace and Hampton Terrace, lies Devon Place, single storey cottages dating from 1864 and built by the coal merchant James McKelvie, originally connected to the rail marshalling yards to the south.

In the main road the Jacobean style villas at 1 to 6 West Coates are by Alexander Black. No 7 is by John Chesser. In the luxurious hinterland 1 Wester Coates Gardens is by Thomas Duncan Rhind.

== Notable residents ==
- Trix Kipling, aka Alice Kipling Fleming, writer and the sister of Rudyard Kipling.
- George F. Merson FRSE lived at 9 Hampton Terrace
- Andrew Edward Scougal FRSE lived at 1 Wester Coates Avenue
- Prof James Walker FRSE lived at 5 Wester Coates Road
