= Fir Tree, County Durham =

Coordinates: 54.704°N 1.784°W

Fir Tree
- Location within County Durham
- Population: 226 (2001)
- OS grid reference: NZ140343
- Unitary authority: County Durham
- Ceremonial county: County Durham
- Region: North East
- Country: England
- Sovereign state: United Kingdom
- Post town: CROOK
- Postcode district: DL15
- Dialling code: 01388
- Police: Durham
- Fire: County Durham and Darlington
- Ambulance: North East
- UK Parliament: North West Durham

Fir Tree is a village in County Durham, in England. It is west of Crook, near the River Wear.

Fir Tree has a petrol station and two pubs: The Duke of York and The Fir Tree Country Hotel. According to the 2001 census, Fir Tree had a population of 226. Wear Valley Council say the population, according to the census of 2007 (for Wear Valley) was 314. It is approximately 2 mi from the small market town of Crook and 6 mi from the large market town Bishop Auckland. Approximately 1 mi northwest of the village is the World War II Harperley POW Camp 93.
