= Andrew Edward Scougal =

Chief Inspector of Schools in Scotland, 1900–1911

Dr Andrew Edward Scougal FRSE LLD (18 April 1846–6 November 1916) was a 19th-century Scottish civil servant who served as Chief Inspector of Schools 1901 to 1911.

== Life ==
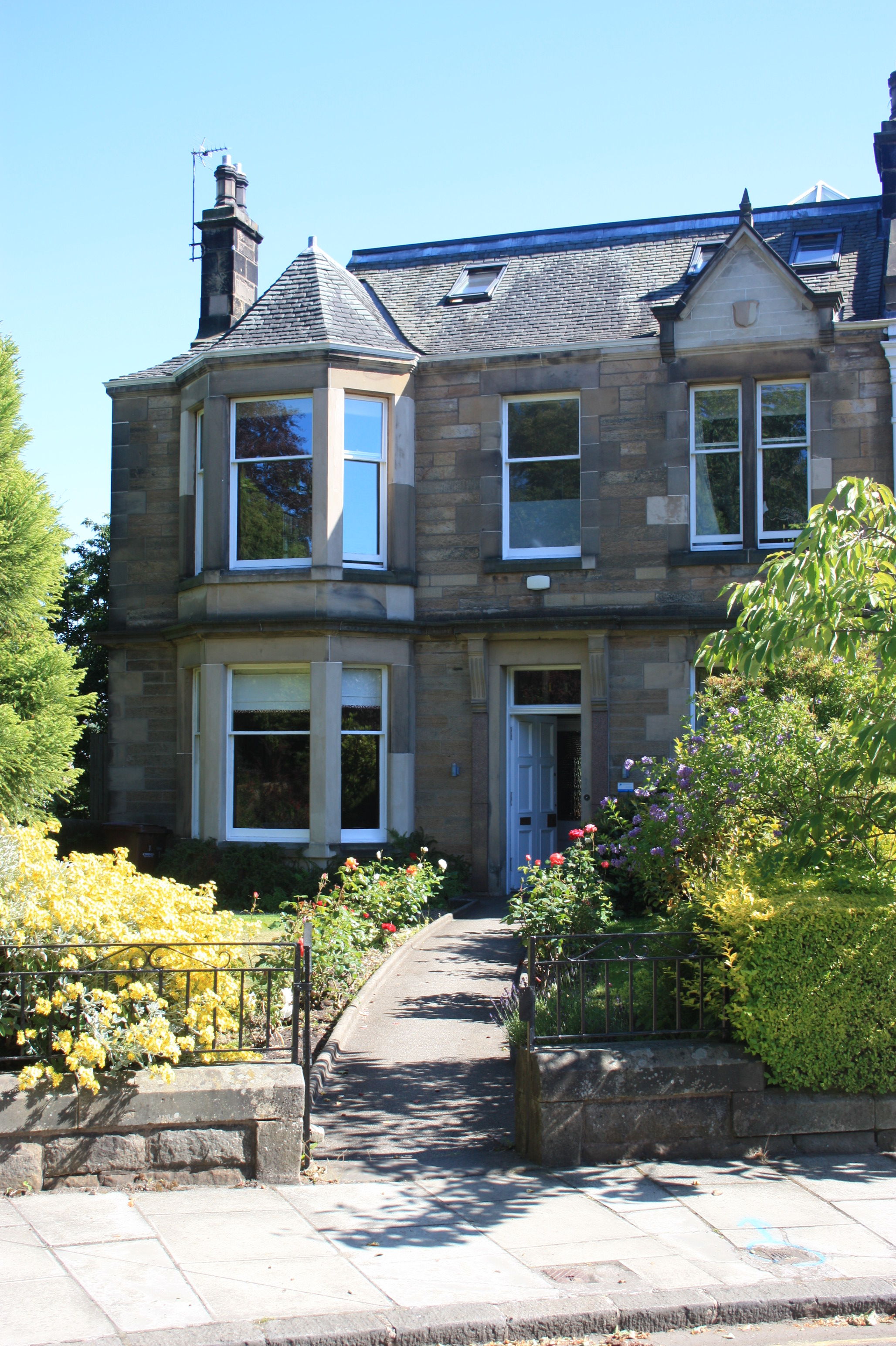
1 Wester Coates Avenue, Edinburgh

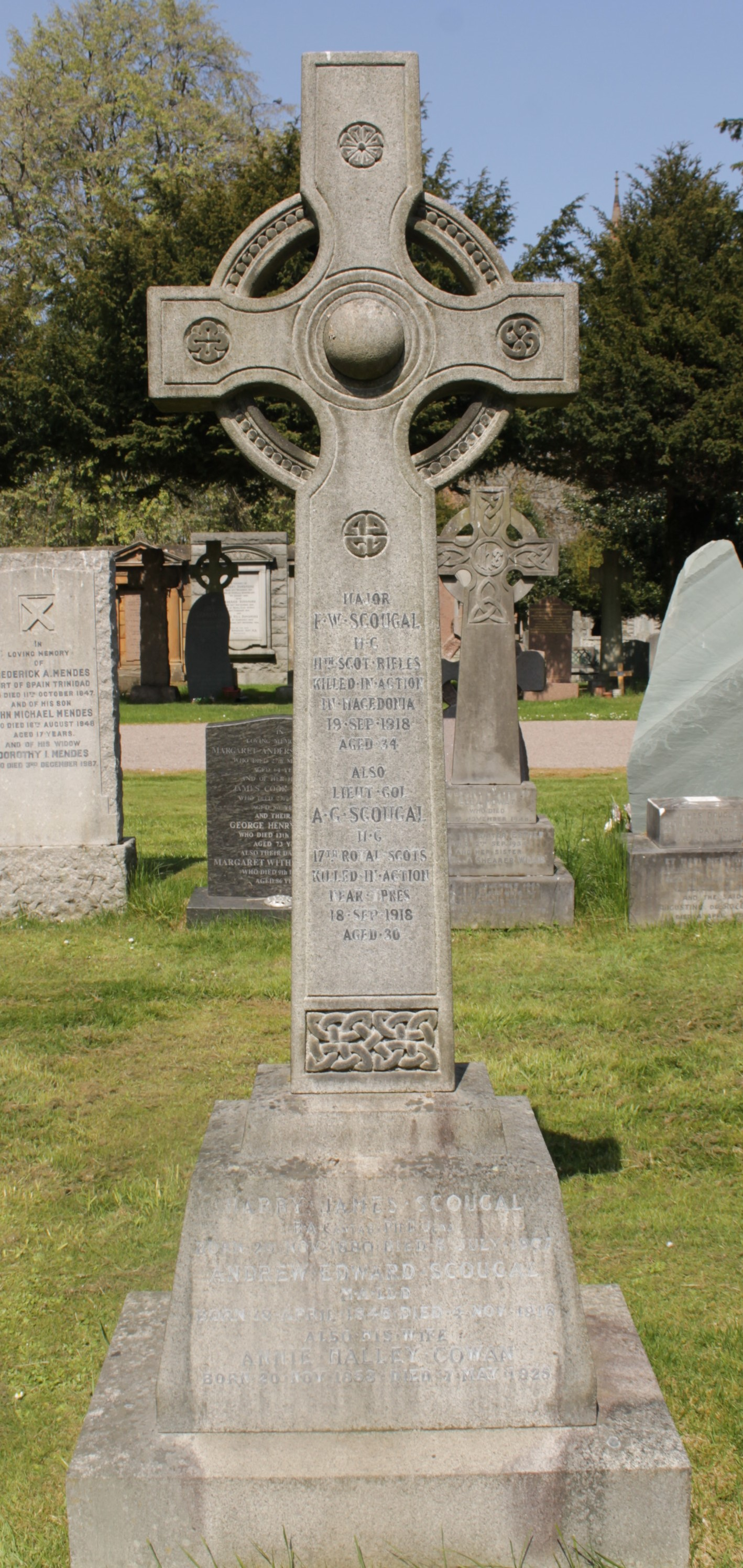
The grave of Andrew Edward Scougal, Dean Cemetery

Scougal was born in Rothesay on 18 April 1846, the son of James Scougal.

The family relocated to Leith Walk in Edinburgh in his youth, living at 13 Pilrig Street. He was educated at Edinburgh Academy and the Edinburgh Institution. He then studied at the University of Edinburgh graduating with an MA in 1865. In 1869 he joined the civil service as a school inspector and rose to become the Chief Inspector of Schools by 1901.

In 1889 he was elected a Fellow of the Royal Society of Edinburgh. His proposers were Sir German Sims Woodhead, Alexander Bruce, Peter Guthrie Tait and Robert McNair Ferguson.

He lived his later life at 1 Wester Coates Avenue, a semi-detached villa in Edinburgh's West End, immediately adjacent to Donaldson's School.

The University of Edinburgh awarded him with an honorary doctorate (LLD) in 1908.

He died in Edinburgh on 4 November 1916, and was buried in Dean Cemetery on 6 November. The grave lies in the south-east section.

== Family ==
He married Annie Halley Cowan (1853-1925).

At least two of their sons joined the British Army: Lt Col Alex Graham Scougal (1888-1918) and Major Francis William Scougal (1884-1918). They were killed on consecutive days (18/19 September) but in different battles in the closing weeks of World War I.

A third son Harry James Scougal (1880-1907) was a scholar who studied at Cambridge University and Jena in Germany. He was an expert on John Dury.
