= Crook, County Durham =

Town in County Durham, England

Coordinates: 54.713°N 1.749°W

Crook
- Town
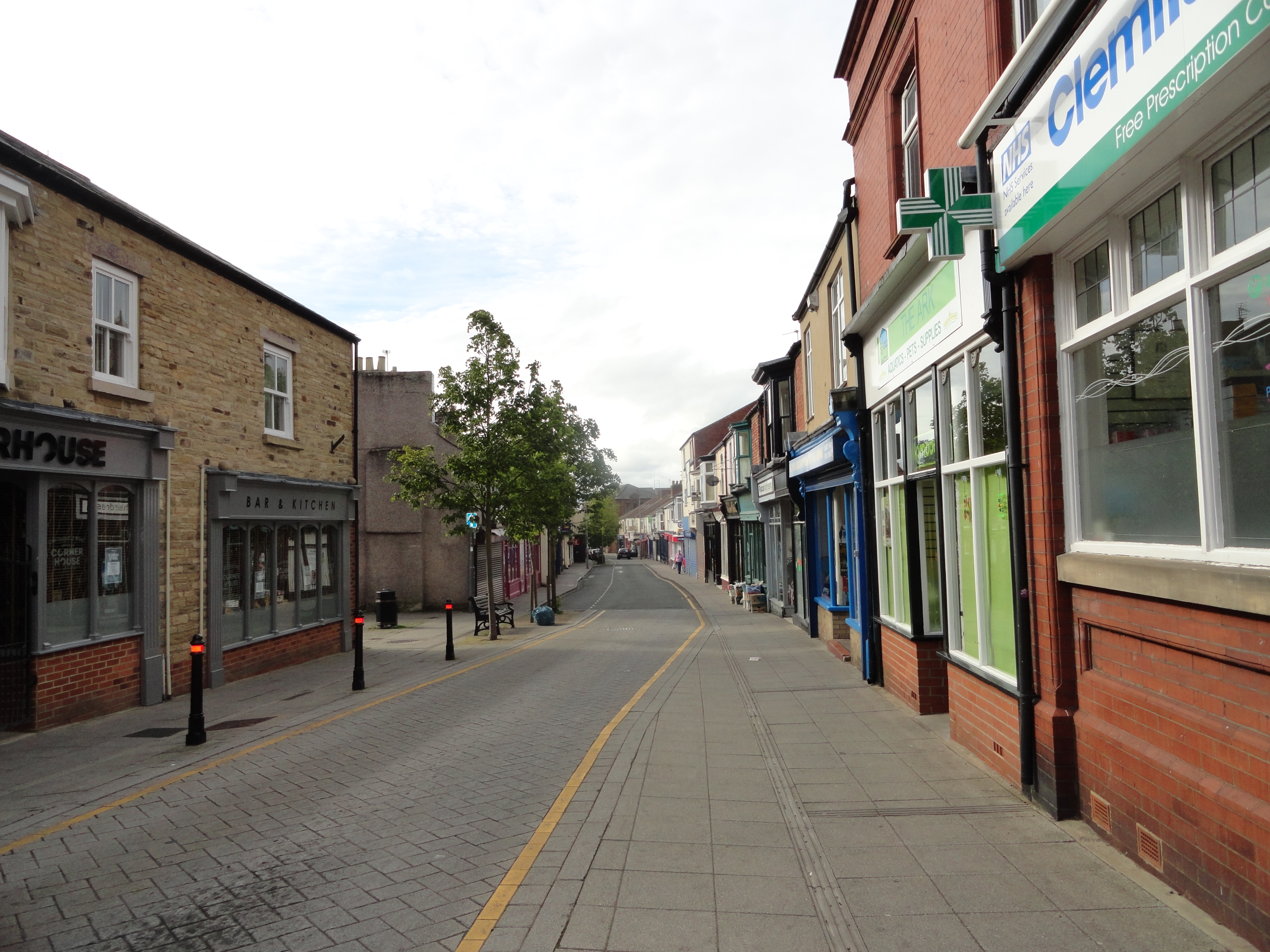
- Hope Street

- Location within County Durham
- Population: 12,333
- OS grid reference: NZ165356
- Unitary authority: County Durham
- Ceremonial county: County Durham
- Region: North East
- Country: England
- Sovereign state: United Kingdom
- Post town: Crook
- Postcode district: DL15
- Dialling code: 01388
- Police: Durham
- Fire: County Durham and Darlington
- Ambulance: North East
- UK Parliament: Bishop Auckland

Crook is a market town in the Durham County Council unitary authority and ceremonial county of County Durham, England. It is located on the edge of Weardale and sometimes referred to as the "Gateway to Weardale".

Crook lies about 9 miles (14 km) south-west of Durham, 5 miles (8.0 km) north-west of Bishop Auckland and 2 miles (3.2 km) from Willington. The A689 road from Durham leads up through Wolsingham and Stanhope into the upper reaches of Weardale. Until 1974, the town was in Crook and Willington Urban District and had a parish council.

== History ==
Crook first appeared as an agricultural village around 1795 although its surrounding districts; Billy Row, Stanley, White Lea and Helmington Row, were established much earlier. In these days Crook was predominantly farmland; however, it also had an Inn and a blacksmith shop, consequently the primary field of employment was within the agricultural industry. 40 years later; Crook became a mining village, and thrived as the coal was very close to the surface and soon there were over 20 mines around the Crook area. By the end of the nineteenth century the town had developed rapidly, in population and economy. However, the local population declined in the following century, as the coal mines and industries closed. With at one point over 34% of the population being unemployed.

Crook's football team, Crook Town F.C., have won the FA Amateur Cup five times, most recently beating Enfield F.C. in 1964, before the cup was abolished in 1974. This record is second only to Crook's near neighbours, Bishop Auckland F.C. The club have also reached the third round of the FA Cup and formed a key role in the development of FC Barcelona, playing a number of friendly matches in the 1910s and 1920s.

== Landmarks ==
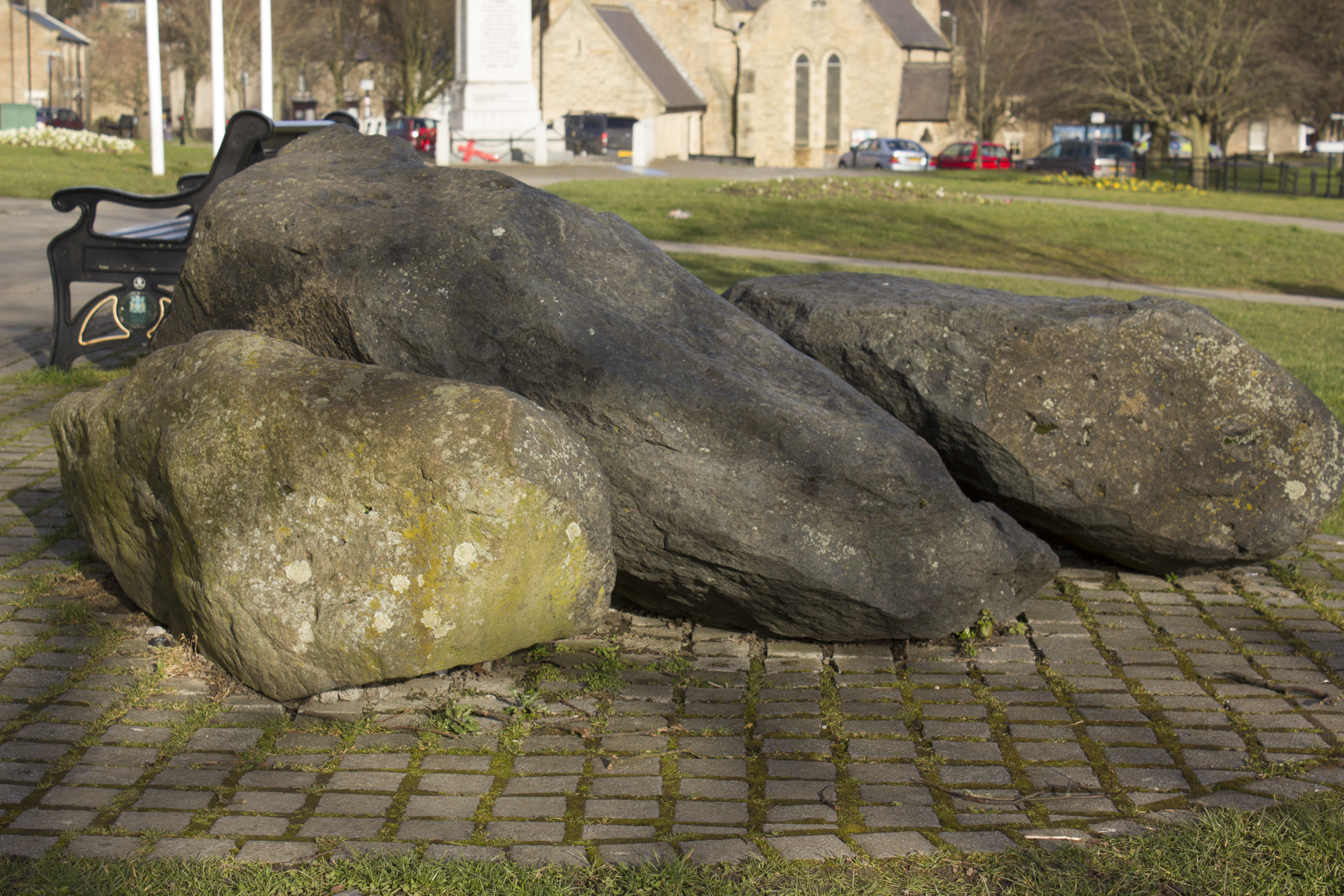
The Devil's Stone a.k.a. The Blue Stone

=== War memorial ===
There is a World War I and World War II war memorial in Crook's town centre.

=== The Devil's Stone / The Blue Stone ===
An erratic, originally part of the Borrowdale volcanic group and found at Dowfold Hill, is situated in Crook's market place.

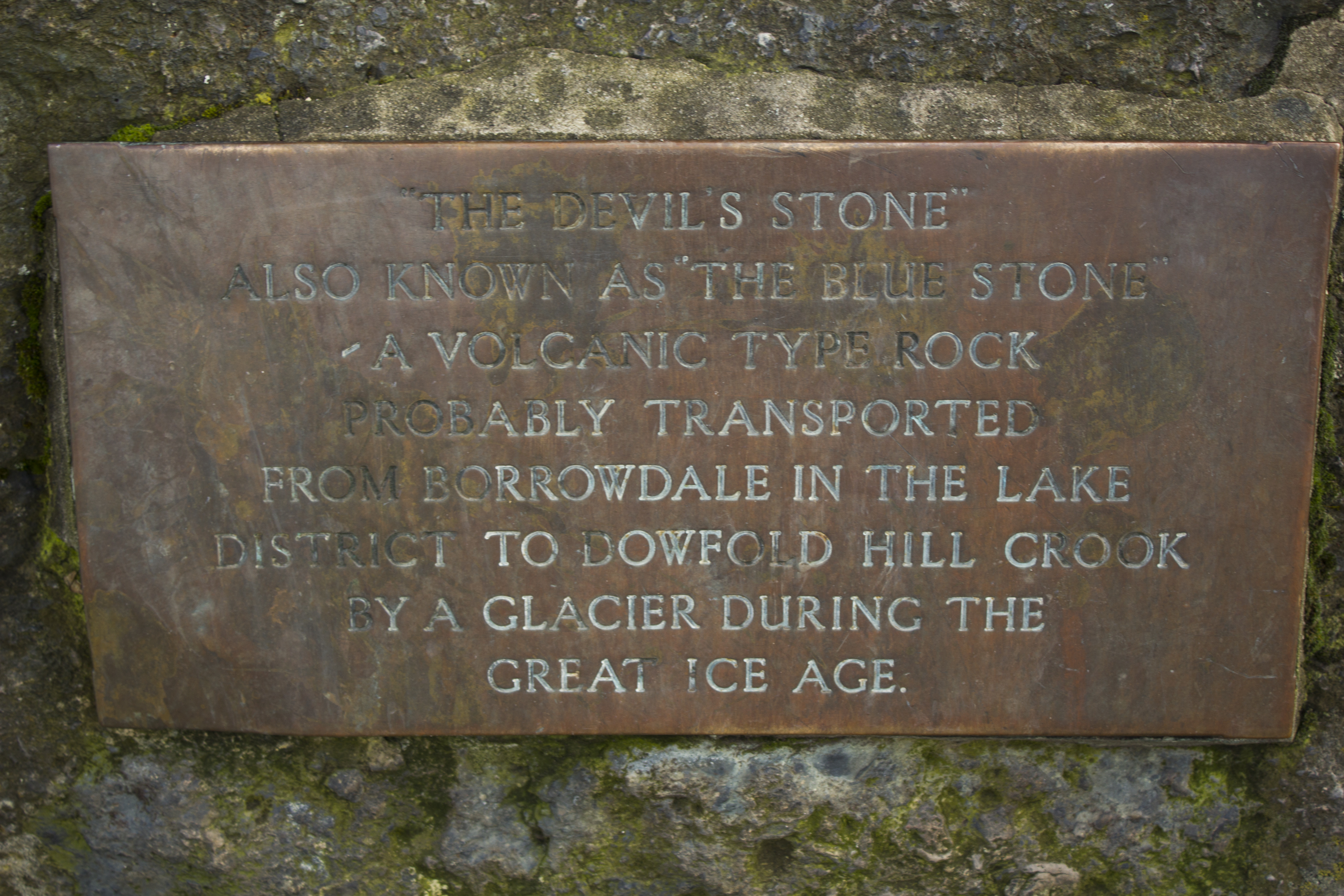
Plaque on The Devil's Stone

== Amenities ==
The centre of Crook, a designated conservation area, features a variety of shops and businesses with the market held on Tuesday mornings and a few stalls on a Saturday. There are prominent churches, the centrally located St Catherine's CE and Our Lady Immaculate & St Cuthbert's RC on Church Hill. Grade II listed St Andrew's Church is an LEP between URC and Methodist Churches. On top of the hills to the east sits Crook Golf Club.

Crook was home to the first purpose built cinema in the north of England, built as the Electric Palace and opened on 21 November 1910. Some of the building's original interior features remain.

== Education ==
=== Nursery ===
==== Crook Nursery School ====
Crook Nursery is an average-sized school that serves the immediate area.

=== Primary ===
==== Crook Primary School ====
Crook Primary School was opened formally in 1950. A larger than average community school that shares a site with Crook Nursery School, it has a pupil capacity of 371.

==== Hartside Primary School ====
A smaller than average primary academy, it has a pupil capacity of 210.

==== St Cuthbert's RC Primary School ====
An average-sized primary academy, with a pupil capacity of 210.

== Culture ==
Empire Electric Palace Theatre stage events including pantomimes.

Crook Carnival is held in early July and features a parade, rides, stalls and live music. Crook's annual Winter Light Parade is held at the end of November and culminates with switching on the town's Christmas lights.

Crookfest is a one day music festival held on the Sunday of the early May Bank Holiday weekend, across three stages, within Crook AFC's ground.

Crook has a relatively large number of public houses and eateries for a town of its size.

== Notable people ==
- Brian Foster, particle physicist and Donald H Perkins Professor of Experimental Physics at the University of Oxford
- Jack Greenwell, FC Barcelona's first official coach, won two Spanish Cups and four Catalan titles
- Darren Holloway, former professional footballer with English Premier League side Sunderland AFC. Also played for Wimbledon, Bradford City, Darlington and Gateshead (loans Carlisle United, Bolton Wanderers and Scunthorpe United)
- Doug McCarthy, former professional darts player; four time BDO World Darts Championship 1979–1982
- Bill Rowe, two time BAFTA Award for Best Sound winning sound engineer who worked on over 160 films between 1955 and 1992
- Constantine Scollen, missionary priest among the Blackfoot and Cree peoples of Canada in the late 19th century
- Nigel Wright, former three time English light welterweight professional boxing champion; two time challenger for British and Commonwealth titles

== Transport ==
Bus

To the north a once a day Crook to Consett service 765. A once an hour Arriva North East service 1 runs to Tow Law 7 days a week

Towards Willington and Durham the Arriva North East X46 services runs every 20 minutes Monday to Saturday and every 30 minutes on Sundays.

Towards the south (Bishop Auckland and Darlington) Weardale Travel run every hour to Bishop Auckland with their service 101 and Arriva North East service 1 runs every 30 minutes during the day Monday to Saturday, service 1 also runs 1 every hour on a Sunday

== Landscape ==
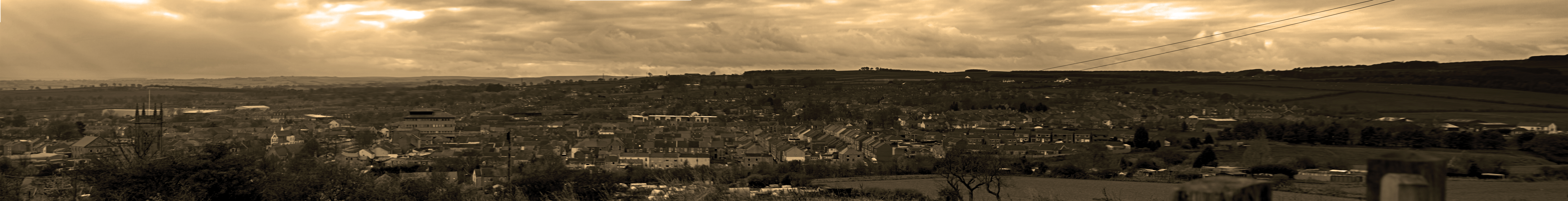
Crook landscape

Crook has a backdrop of traditional and modern buildings. The hills surround the town on all sides apart from the south side of the town. The tallest hill stands at 300 metres above the town, about 980 ft. The highest point in the town is on West Road where the height is 210 metres (about 690 ft).

Approximately 2 miles to the west of Crook on the A689, back towards Wolsingham and Weardale is the surviving World War II Harperley POW Camp 93.

== Gallery ==
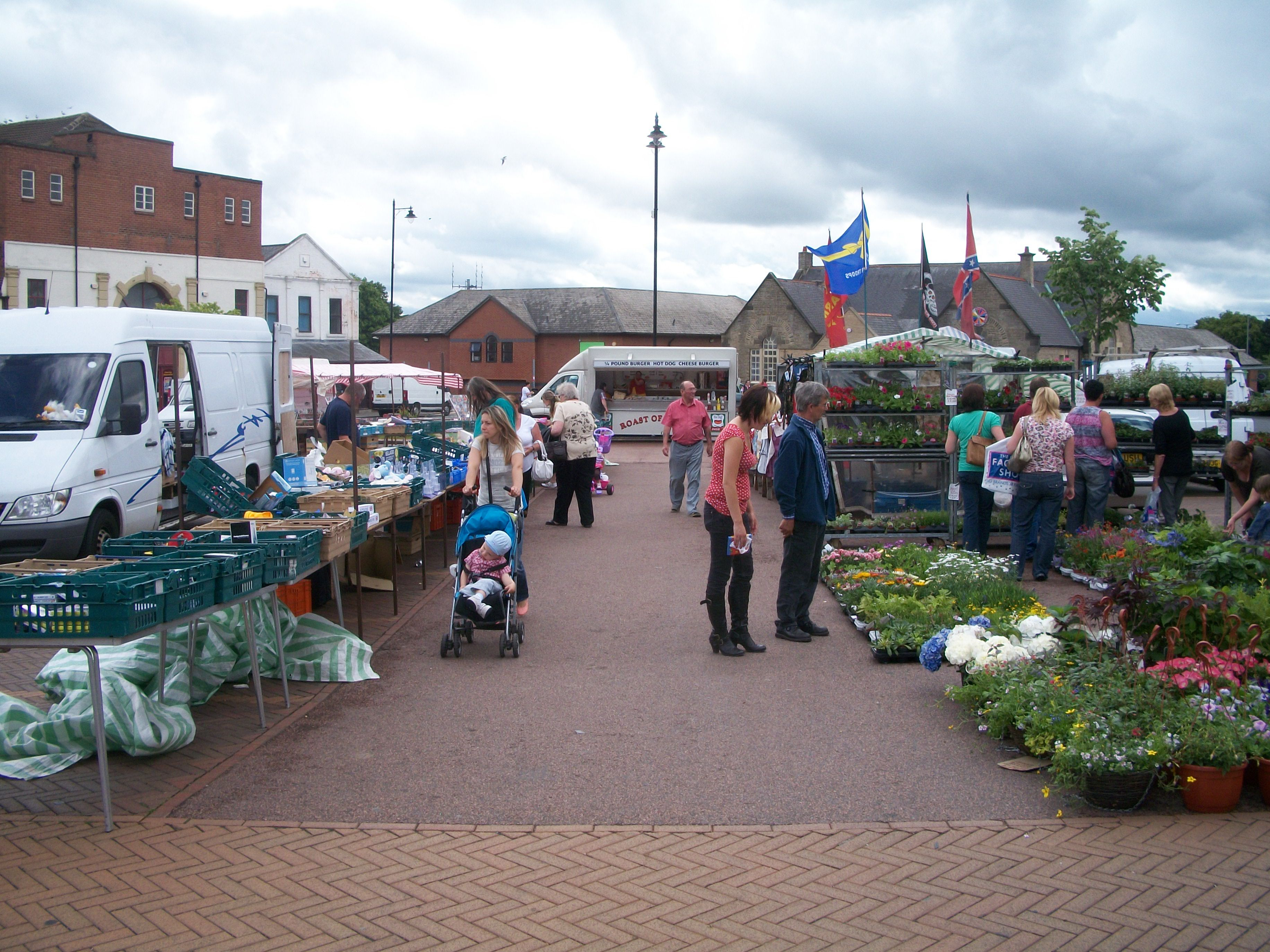
Crook Market

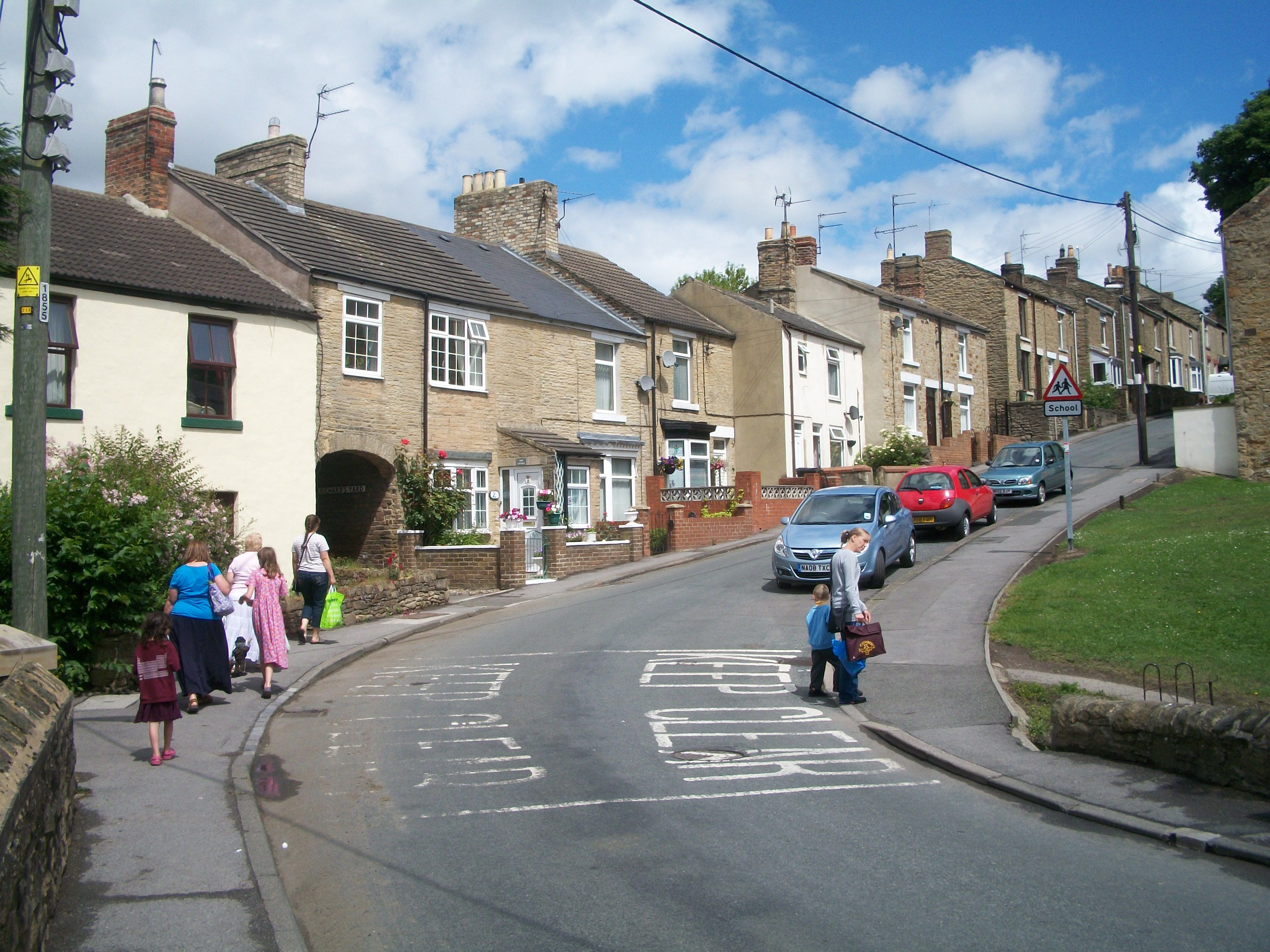
Looking up Church Hill

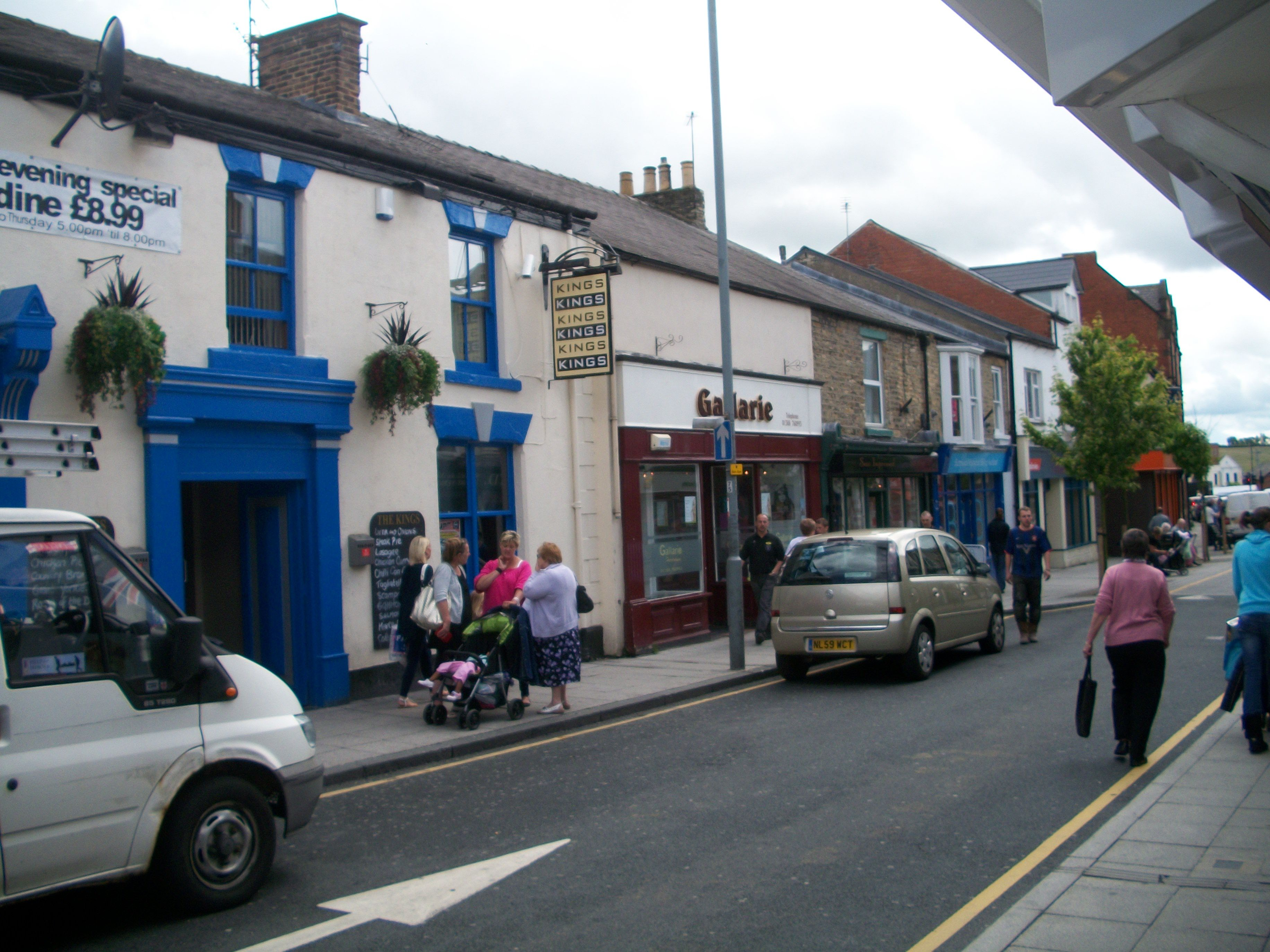
Shopping in Hope Street

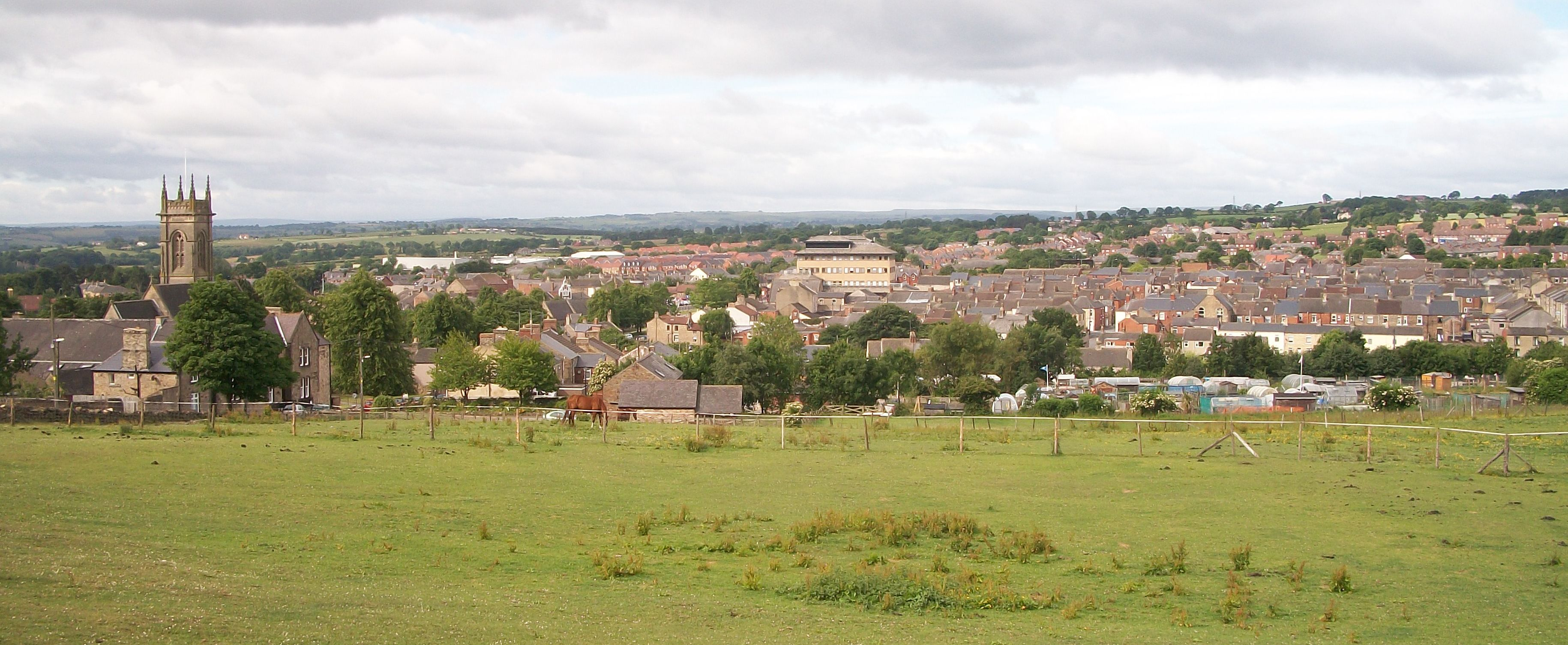
A view across Crook
