= Windlestone Hall =

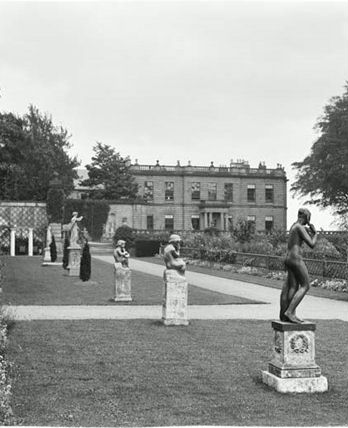
- Windlestone Hall, before 1910

- Location in County Durham

General information
- Location: County Durham, England, UK
- Coordinates: 54.653°N 1.593°W

Listed Building – Grade II*
- Designated: 9 January 1968
- Reference no.: 1160327

National Register of Historic Parks and Gardens
- Designated: 27 November 1998
- Reference no.: 1001407
- OS grid: NZ263287

Windlestone Hall is a mid-16th century Elizabethan country house, heavily rebuilt in 1821 to form a Greek revival stately home, situated near Rushyford, County Durham, England. The Hall sits within 400 acres of designed parkland. It is a Grade II* Listed building. As of 2022 it is back in private family ownership, with the surrounding estate maintained and conserved by a dedicated heritage charitable trust.

== History ==
=== Early history ===
The Eden family who held the manor of Windlestone in the 17th century were Royalists during the English Civil War, and Colonel Robert Eden who had served in the King's army, was obliged to campaign for the return of his confiscated estate. Following the Restoration of the Monarchy in 1660, his grandson, also Robert Eden, was created a baronet in 1672, (see Eden baronets).

=== Construction ===
In 1821, the fifth Baronet, Robert Johnson Eden, replaced the 16th-century manor house with a new mansion designed by architect Ignatius Bonomi. The two-storey house presents a twelve-bay balustraded frontage to the east. A balustraded Doric order colonnade extends across nine bays of the ground floor. The north ends in a large apse. A billiard room was attached to the north east in the late-19th century.

=== People associated with the house ===
On the death of the fifth Baronet in 1844, the estate and Baronetcy passed to his first cousin once removed, Sir William Eden, who was already the fourth Eden of Maryland Baronet. He was High Sheriff of Durham in 1848.

The house was the birthplace in 1897 of Anthony Eden, the younger son of the sixth baronet; Eden entered parliament as a Conservative Party Member of Parliament in 1923, later serving as a cabinet minister before serving as Prime Minister from 1955 to 1957. Eden's brother Timothy inherited the baronetcies and the estate on the death of their father in 1915, and sold the Hall (along with 4,500 acres, a London property at Hyde Park Gardens and the village of Rushyford) in 1936 to John Todd of Northallerton. By that time, the Hall had been leased for three years to the Wayfarers' Benevolent Fund, a charity helping to train young homeless people. The lease still had seven years remaining at the time of the sale.

=== Later history ===
The house and estate were used as a prisoner of war camp during World War II, a satellite camp of Harperley POW Camp 93. Durham County Council acquired the Hall around 1954 and, between 1957 and 2006, it was occupied by Windlestone Hall School, a local authority residential special school. The school closed in 2006, and was sold for £240,000 by Durham County Council to William Davenport in 2011. Durham County Council was criticised for the sale, especially when Windlestone Hall was put back on the market three years later for £2,500,000 – over ten times the previous sale price. Davenport was jailed for 6 years in 2016 for using forged documents to acquire a mortgage when purchasing the house and estate, and the property was repossessed by the bank.

Windlestone Hall was listed for auction with an entry guide price of £400,000 in July 2017. On 17 July 2017 it was removed from the auction and marked as "sold prior to auction" to an, as yet, unknown buyer. The BBC later reported that the Hall had been purchased by Carlauren, a property developer, for £850,000; it intended to turn the Hall into a high-end care home and attracted £8.5m in investment through the sale of 53 residential units which investors would lease to care-home residents. The BBC reported in October 2019, however, that the property was "still derelict" and not operating as a care home.

=== Phased construction of the 1821 Hall ===
The 1821 reconstruction of the 1650s Elizabethan Hall was carried out in 4 main phases, likely around the demolition of parts of the 1560s mansion. The picture below shows the 4 key phases:

- First Phase: main mansion house
- Second Phase: extended entertainment wing with apsidal termination c.1844
- Third Phase: service range c.1844
- Fourth Phase: billiard room addition c.1890
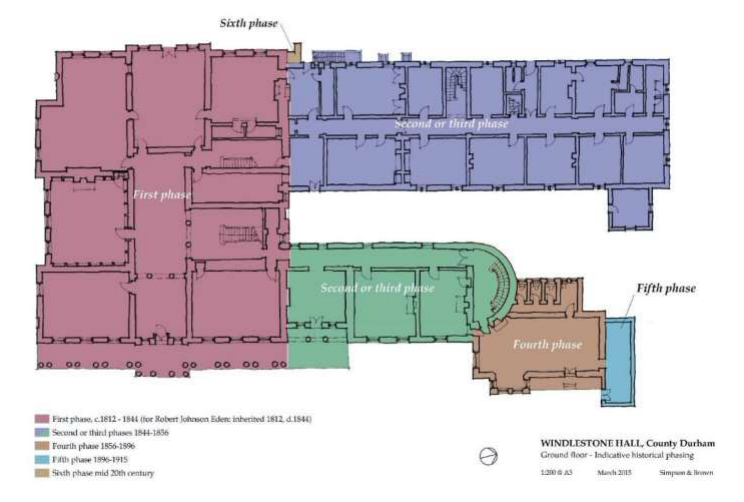
Windlestone Hall Phased Construction

=== Chronology ===
Evolution and chronology of the Windlestone Park Estate
1197
Windlestone village referred to (Windlesden)
1448
Reference to a village settlement when Cecilia, wife of John Windliston

deceased, confirmed to her son and heir his half heritage which included, 2 messuages, 5 oxgangs and 12 acres of land, 3 of meadow in the village of Wyndlistone

1538
Some of the Windlestone lands were purchased by John Eden
1576
Christopher Saxton's map shows a settlement at Windlestone
1635
After the Dissolution Neasham Abbey land at Windlestone was acquired by

John Eden of Windlestone

1681
Durham Freehold Book includes ‘Sir Robert Eden, Bart at West Auckland and

Sir Timothy Eden, Bart JP lord of the Manor of Windlestone

1730
No 3 South Bailey (Grade II*. List Entry Number 1161313), Durham City

(Grade II*)built as Sir Robert Eden's town house.

1768
Andrew Armstrong The County Palatine of Durham shows enclosed park at

Windleston, buildings lining road between Rushyford and Crawlaw. A689 not on line of this road. Road shown leading south to Woodham, possible remains of medieval village.

1800
The medieval settlement was removed, earlier hall demolished, roads rerouted
c19
Early c19th estate amounted to 4000 acres and 20 farms
1801
Jones & Smith Map of County Durham depicts enclosed parkland
1817
Windlestone clock set up on New Year’s Day by John Bolton of Durham
1820
Greenwood map of County Durham. Extensive parkland depicted to south

and west of hall with rides and meandering route to the hall from the south. Serpentine lake shown in south park

1821
Windlestone Hall built by Ignatius Bonomi (1787 - 1870). Durham Advertiser,

June 1821 recorded laying of foundation stone (Brigantiap.9)

1830
Windlestone township. No separate tithe apportionment or plan (no tithes

payable, due to either earlier commutation or imminent merger) DUL Tithe Records

1848
North Lodge built
1896
Ordnance Survey shows South Lodge
1897
Sir Anthony Eden (1897 - 1977) born at Windlestone
1920
The hall became the Wayfarers Benevolent Association Headquarters
1936
Eden family sold the mansion and estate

== Preservation ==
Having been exposed to the elements since the major roof metal (lead) theft of 2017, the building is now considered to be beyond economical repair - costing more to repair than its completed value.

In November 2019 Durham County Council secured the property and gave notice for no access due to safety. The interior was deteriorating rapidly although it seems work had been started by someone, as yet unknown, to secure the exterior from further damage and deterioration.

In July 2020 the Hall and Estate were purchased by a dedicated preservation trust, a registered UK charity, with the sole aim of protecting, restoring and preserving the heritage assets. The Trust have ambitious plans for complete restoration of Windlestone Hall to its former glory as a significant private residence, reinstatement of the walled gardens and grounds, returning the designed landscape and reinstating a working and viable country estate with significant access for the public.

=== 2021 Planning Consent ===
On 5 July 2021 Durham County Council's County Planning Committee met to consider both FPA (Full Planning Application) and LBC (Listed Building Consent) applications made by the Windlestone Park Estate Preservation Trust. The meeting was the first to be held in person at County Hall, Durham, since the COVID-19 pandemic began, the meeting was streamed live to the public. Both applications were unanimously approved by Durham County Council and paved the way for the complete restoration of the Windlestone Park Estate. The planning application contains:

- Complete restoration of Grade II* listed Windlestone Hall, being returned to a single private residence
- Complete restoration of the Grade II* listed Clocktower, with new clock faces and mechanism being installed alongside major masonry conservation
- Complete restoration of the private parterre gardens of Windlestone Hall
- Complete restoration of the large walled garden to the west of Windlestone Hall
- Restoration of the Grade II listed 'Old Stables' to form staff accommodation and an estate energy centre and service yard
- Restoration of the Grade II listed 'Clocktower Stables' to form a commercial hub containing: offices, a cafe, a coffee shop, estate farm shop and independent retail units
- Reinstatement of the mid 19th century ornamental lake, complete with island and temple
- Construction of an Ionic Temple on the site of the former estate mausoleum
- Restoration of North Lodge to form the estate office
- Significant landscape improvements
- Enabling development in the form of 13 4 and 5 bedroom detached dwellings, and 4 leasehold apartments

Urgent repairs and conservation work had already been underway since the Windlestone Park Estate Preservation Trust purchased the site in July 2020, but the grant of planning permission will see an immediate start to the major works at the site.

== The Clocktower ==
The Clocktower and surrounding c-plan stables pre-date the major rebuilding of the main hall, with the estate archives showing that the clock mechanism was commissioned and set to work in 1817. The Clocktower is Grade II* listed in its own right, and has a striking resemblance to that at Wallington Hall, Northumberland.
