= Eden Camp Museum =

Museum in North Yorkshire, England

Coordinates: 54°09′05″N 000°46′47″W

Eden Camp Modern History Museum is a large Second World War-related museum near Malton in North Yorkshire in England.

It occupies a former Second World War prisoner-of-war camp of 33 huts. After the prisoners left, the camp was used for storage and then abandoned. Its grounds then became overgrown. As the museum was being set up, much clearing, as well as repair and renovation of the buildings, was required.

One of its buildings contains three human torpedoes and a "Sleeping Beauty" Motorised Submersible Canoe.The museum has fully restored a Super Sherman (M50) to its original working classic, amongst many other military vehicles which are now on display in the Heritage Hall - a new purpose built events and exhibition centre.

The museum also has a reproduction V1.

== Timeline ==
Original Use

- Early 1942: The War Office identified and requisitioned the site from Fitzwilliam Estates. Tents were established inside a barbed wire enclosure.
- Mid-1943: A permanent camp was completed and the first Italian prisoners of war were moved in.
- End of 1943: The Italian prisoners of war were moved out.
- Early 1944: The camp provided accommodation for Polish forces amassed in the North Yorkshire area in preparation for an invasion of Europe.
- Mid-1944: The first German prisoners of war arrived at Eden Camp.
- Early 1949: The last German prisoner of war left the camp.
- 1950 to 1955: Eden Camp was used as an agricultural holiday camp where guests paid for board and lodgings to work on local farms. School children stayed at Eden Camp during school holidays to learn more about the countryside and agriculture.
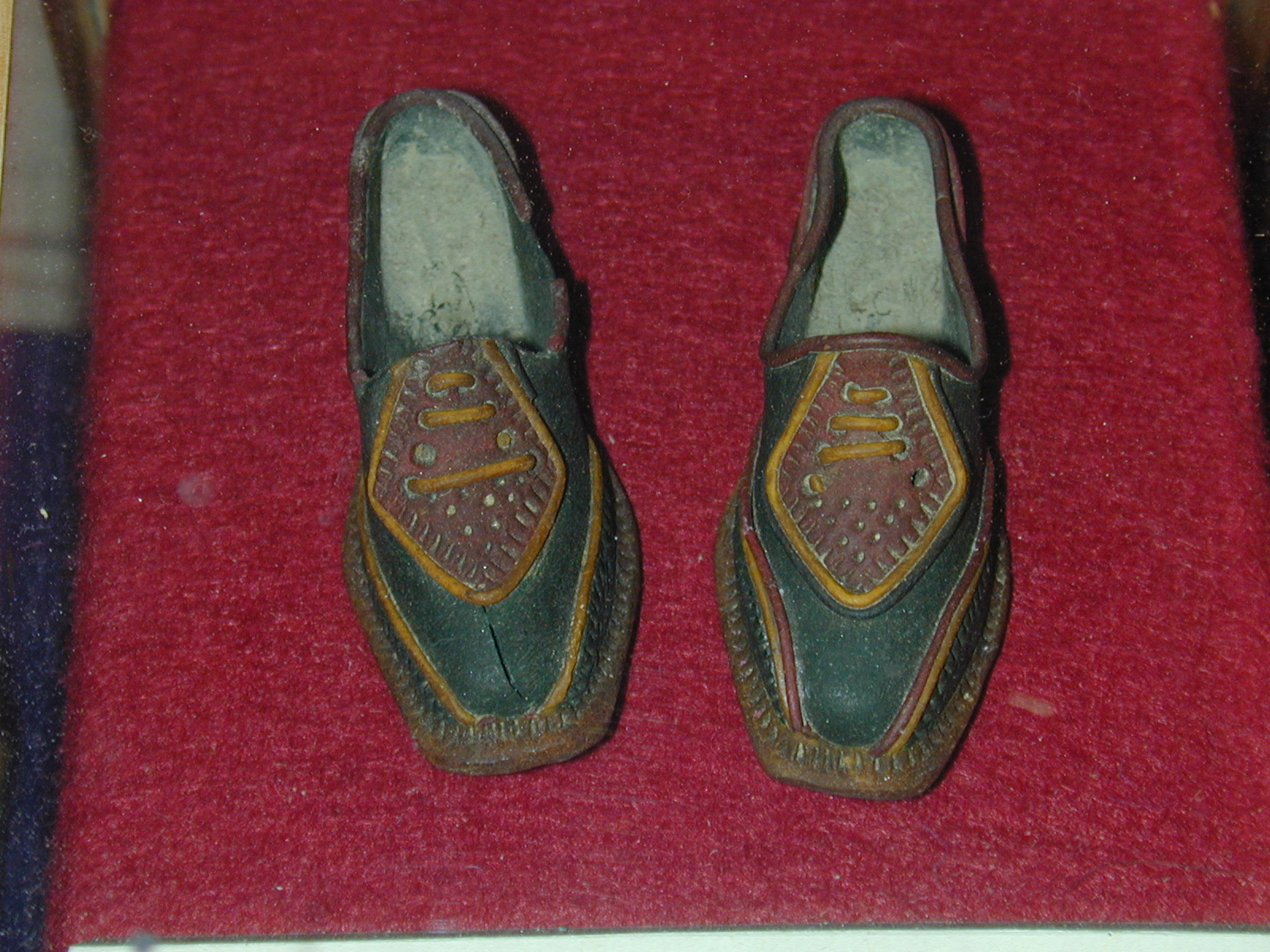
  Shoes made by an Italian POW at Eden Camp
- 1952: It was used as a Ministry of Agriculture and Fisheries depot.
- 1955: The site was returned to Fitzwilliam Estates who leased it to Headley Wise and Sons who owned Malton Minerals. The huts were used for drying and storing grain and rearing pheasants on grain.
- 1985: Stan Johnson bought the site intending to set up a potato crisp factory. But three Italian ex-Eden Camp prisoners of war approached him seeking permission to look around the camp, and thus the idea of preserving the camp and opening it as a museum was born. By then the site had become severely overgrown with wild vegetation, which had to be cleared.

Museum Use

- 21 March 1987: Eden Camp Museum opened to the public. It was billed as the world's first Modern History Theme Museum and ten huts were used for display.
- 1990: Hut 24, the first of a series of five huts designated to display the military and political events worldwide between 1919 and 1945, opened.
- 1992: Eden Camp won the Yorkshire Tourist Board's 'Visitor Attraction of the Year' and came second in the England for Excellence English Tourist Board's Awards for Tourism.
- 1995: The last remaining empty hut opened and was dedicated to coincide with the 50th Anniversary VE Day celebrations. The museum also won its second Yorkshire Tourist Board 'Tourism for All' award.
- 1996: It won the award again.
- 1998: Eden Camp won the Yorkshire Tourist Board's 'Visitor Attraction of the Year' award.
- 1999: Hut 13 opened to cover military conflicts which British Commonwealth forces have been involved in since the end of the Second World War up to the present day.
- 2000: Hut 11 opened to include the events of the First World War.
- 2001: Eden Camp was voted runner up attraction to the London Eye by the readers of Group Travel Organiser magazine.
- 8 November 2002: Prince Philip visited the museum.
- 2002: Start of refurbishment of Hut 10, which now houses a comprehensive collection of P.O.W artefacts
- 2006: Medal Room set up.
- 2009: Completion of redevelopment of Hut 22, Forces Reunion, where hundreds of photos of personnel can be seen.
- 2021: Eden Camp announce redevelopment of Hut 5's Blitz Experience, by Technically Creative.
- 2022: Following closures during the pandemic, the museum invested approximately a quarter of a million pounds into refurbishing in the camp. New roofing, doors and windows were installed on the 80 year old building, the front of site was re-landscaped, and the museum launched its Green Policy with an aim to become Carbon Neutral by 2030. Multiple wild flower sites were sown across the site, and a new toilet block with self sufficient solar panels was erected. In addition the Museum replaced the diesel generator with a new electricity cable, reducing the annual carbon footprint by over 77%.
- April 2022: The new BLITZ EXPERIENCE was launched, using historic artefacts and modern technology. The new Heritage Hall was also launched to house the restored military vehicles on site. The Hall also doubles as a wedding and events space, available to hire. It houses a stage, bar and full AV equipment.
- January 2023: Eden Camp acquired its ceremony license to hold Wedding ceremonies as well as receptions from January 2023.

There have been more changes since January and more are coming soon.

== See also ==
- List of POW camps in Britain
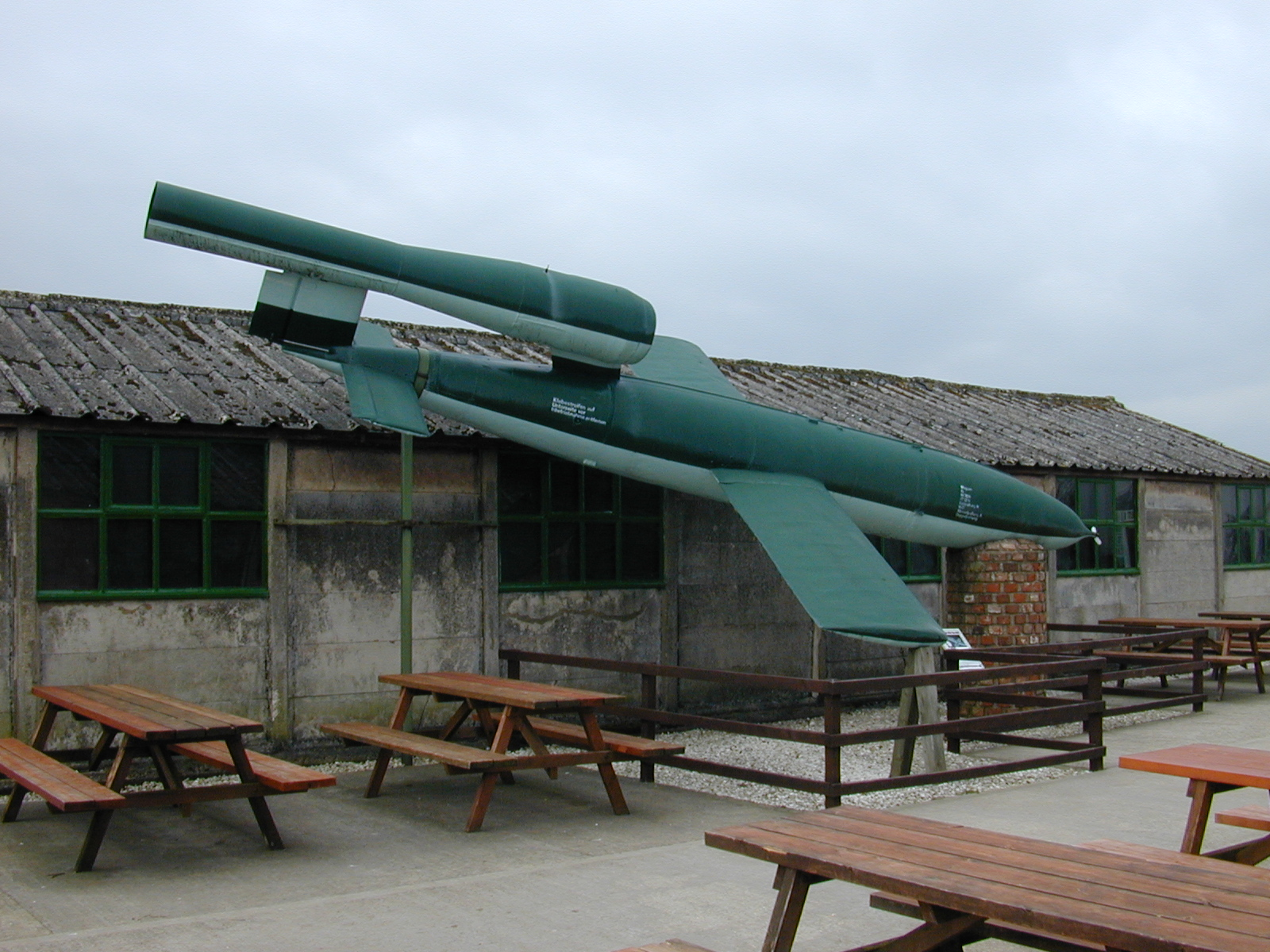
  German V-1 flying bomb at Eden Camp with POW hut behind Hut 5 (The Blitz)
