= Rushyford =

Village in County Durham, England

Coordinates: 54.653°N 1.563°W

- Location within County Durham
- OS grid reference: NZ282286
- Unitary authority: County Durham
- Ceremonial county: County Durham
- Region: North East
- Country: England
- Sovereign state: United Kingdom
- Post town: FERRYHILL
- Postcode district: DL17
- Dialling code: 01388
- Police: Durham
- Fire: County Durham and Darlington
- Ambulance: North East

Rushyford is a village in County Durham, England. It is situated between Darlington and Durham, close to Newton Aycliffe and Chilton. About 1 mile (1.6 km) west of the village is Windlestone Hall, a 16th-century country house which was significantly enlarged in the early 19th Century, historically the seat of the Eden family. The Prime Minister between 1955 and 1957, and later Earl of Avon, Anthony Eden was born in the house in 1897. The intersection of the A167 and the A689 roads is to the village's immediate north-east.
