= Henry St John-Mildmay =

Henry St John-Mildmay may refer to:

- Sir Henry St John-Mildmay, 3rd Baronet (1764–1808), MP for Westbury, Hampshire and Winchester
- Sir Henry St John-Mildmay, 4th Baronet (1787–1848), MP for Winchester
- Sir Henry St John-Mildmay, 5th Baronet (1810–1902}, British Army officer
- Sir Henry St John-Mildmay, 6th Baronet (1853–1916), English cricketer and British Army officer

== See also ==
- St John-Mildmay Baronets
- Henry St John (disambiguation)
- Henry Mildmay (disambiguation)
