= Mildmay =

Mildmay may refer to:

== Places ==
- Mildmay, Islington, Greater London, United Kingdom
  - Mildmay (ward), electoral ward
- Mildmay, Ontario, Canada

== People ==
=== Title ===
- Baron Mildmay of Flete, a title in the Peerage of the United Kingdom

=== Surname ===
- Mildmay baronets, two baronetcies of Moulsham, Essex, created 1611 and 1765
- Audrey Mildmay (1900–1953), Canadian soprano
- Anthony Mildmay (died 1617), MP and diplomat
- Grace Mildmay (née Sharington; 1552–1620), diarist, medical practitioner, and wife of Sir Anthony
- Henry Mildmay (disambiguation)
- Thomas Mildmay (disambiguation)
- Walter Mildmay (bef. 1523–1589), an Elizabethan Chancellor of the Exchequer

=== Given name ===
- Mildmay Fane (disambiguation)

== Other ==
- Mildmay line, a railway line in London
- Mildmay Mission, a health and welfare charity founded in the 1860s by William Pennefather
- Mildmay Mission Hospital, a cottage hospital founded by Catherine Pennefather in the memory of William Pennefather; later became UK's first HIV/AIDS hospice
- Mildmay Monarchs, an ice hockey team from Mildmay, Ontario
- Mildmay Library, near Newington Green in London

== See also ==
- Mildmay Park railway station, now closed, also near Newington Green in London
- St John-Mildmay baronets
