= Mildmay baronets of Moulsham (second creation, 1765) =

Escutcheon of the Mildmay baronets of Moulsham

The Mildmay baronetcy, of Moulsham in the County of Essex, was created in the Baronetage of Great Britain on 5 February 1765 for William Mildmay. He was a descendant of William Mildmay, uncle of the 1st Baronet of the 1611 creation. The title became extinct on his death in 1771.

William Mildmay was born in Surat, the son of William Mildmay, chief official of the East India Company factory there, and his wife Sarah Willcox. He matriculated in 1723 at Emmanuel College, Cambridge, where he graduated M.A. in 1728, and the same year entered the Middle Temple, where he was called to the bar in 1729.

A bencher of the Middle Temple, Mildmay was during the 1750s involved in diplomatic negotiations with France over colonial possessions. He inherited property on the death in 1756 of Benjamin Mildmay, 1st Earl FitzWalter.

His estates devolved after his death to his kinsman Carew Mildmay, who in his turn bequeathed the estates to his grand-niece, Jane Mildmay, wife of Sir Henry St John, 2nd Baronet. Their son Sir Henry St John-Mildmay, 3rd Baronet assumed the additional surname of Mildmay.

== Mildmay baronets, of Moulsham (1765) ==
- Sir William Mildmay, 1st Baronet (c. 1706–1771)

== See also ==
- St John-Mildmay Baronets

== Notes ==
Baronetage of Great Britain
Preceded by Pigot baronets	Mildmay baronets of Moulsham; 5 February 1765	Succeeded by Major baronets
