= Henry Mildmay (disambiguation) =

Henry Mildmay (c. 1593–1668) was one of the regicides of Charles I.

Henry Mildmay may also refer to:

- Henry Mildmay (of Graces) (1619–1692), English MP for Essex and Maldon
- Sir Henry Mildmay, 6th Baronet (1853–1916), English cricketer
- Henry St John-Mildmay (disambiguation)

== See also ==
- Mildmay (disambiguation)
