= Henry St John =

Henry St. John may refer to:

- Henry St John (MP for Stockbridge) (c. 1568–1621), MP for Stockbridge, 1589 and 1593
- Sir Henry St John (MP for Huntingdon) (fl. 1621–25), English politician
- Sir Henry St John, 1st Viscount St John (1652–1742), father of the 1st Viscount Bolingbroke and MP for Wootton Bassett, 1679–1700
- Henry St John, 1st Viscount Bolingbroke (1678–1751), English philosopher and MP for Wootton Bassett, 1701–1708
- Sir Henry St John, 2nd Baronet (1737–1784), British politician
- Henry St John (British Army officer) (1738–1818), MP for Wootton Bassett, 1761 and 1802
- Henry St John, 13th Baron St John of Bletso (1758–1805), British peer
- Henry St. John (Ohio politician) (1783–1869), American politician from Ohio
- Henry St John, 4th Viscount Bolingbroke, 5th Viscount St John (1786–1851)
- Henry St John, 5th Viscount Bolingbroke, 6th Viscount St John (1820–1899)
- Henry St John (Royal Navy officer) (1837–1909), British admiral
- Henry St John, 18th Baron St John of Bletso (1876–1920), English peer

== See also ==
- Henry St John-Mildmay (disambiguation)
- Henry St. John Cooper (1869–1926), English author
- John Creasey (1908–1973), who used the pen name Henry St. John Cooper
- Viscount Bolingbroke, for several other Viscounts Bolingbroke named Henry St John
