= Abraham Tucker =

English country gentleman

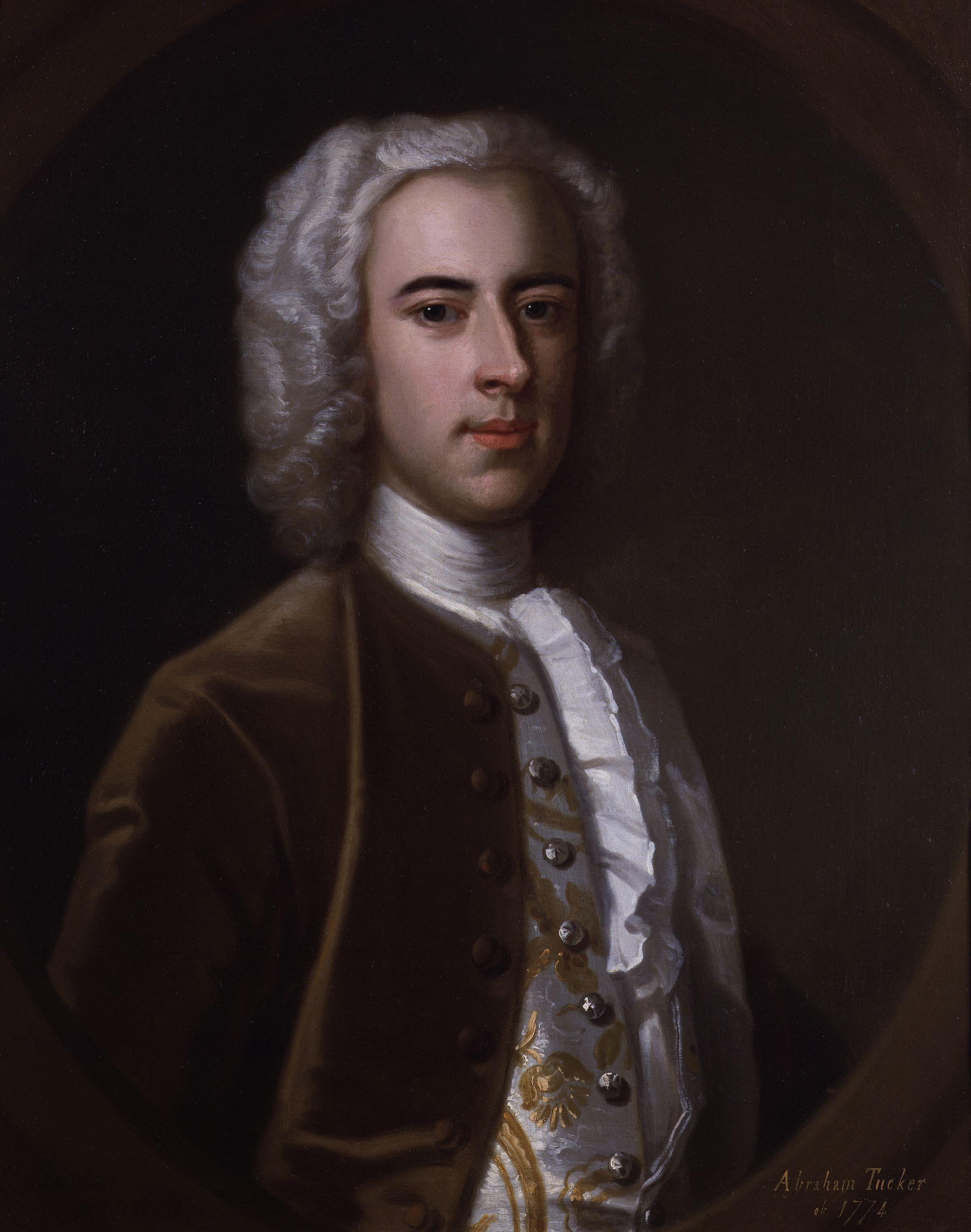
1739 portrait of Abraham Tucker by Enoch Seeman

Abraham Tucker (2 September 1705 – 20 November 1774) was an English country gentleman, who devoted himself to the study of philosophy. He wrote The Light of Nature Pursued (1768–1777) under the name of Edward Search.

== Biography ==
Tucker was born in London of a Somerset family, the son of a wealthy city merchant. His parents died during his infancy, and he was brought up by his uncle, Sir Isaac Tillard. In 1721, he entered Merton College, Oxford, as a gentleman commoner, and studied philosophy, mathematics, French, Italian and music. He afterwards studied laws at the Inner Temple, but was never called to the bar.

In 1727 he bought Betchworth Castle, near Dorking, where he passed the remainder of his life. In 1736 Tucker married Dorothy Barker, daughter of Edward Barker of East Betchworth, cursitor baron of the exchequer. They had two daughters, Judith (died 1794), and Dorothea Maria, who married in 1763 Sir Henry St John, 2nd Baronet of Dogmersfield Park. On his wife's death in 1754, Tucker occupied himself in collecting together all the letters that had passed between them, which, we are told, he transcribed twice over under the title of "The Picture of Artless Love."

He then concentrated on his major work, The Light of Nature Pursued, of which in 1763 he published a specimen under the title of Free Will, Foreknowledge, and Fate, by "Edward Search". The strictures of a critic in the Monthly Review of July 1763 drew from him a pamphlet called Man in Quest of Himself, by "Cuthbert Comment" (reprinted in Samuel Parr's Metaphysical Tracts, 1837), "a defence of the individuality of the human mind or self." In 1768 the first two volumes of his work were published. The remaining volume appeared posthumously. His eyesight failed him completely in 1771, but he contrived an apparatus which enabled him to write legibly enough that the result could be transcribed by his daughter. The final volume was ready for publication when he died.

Tucker took no part in politics, and wrote a pamphlet, The Country Gentleman's Advice to his Son on the Subject of Party Clubs (1755), cautioning young men against its snares.

== Work ==
Tucker's magnum opus is The Light of Nature Pursued, originally published in three volumes:

- Volume 1: Human Nature (1768)
- Volume 2: Theology (1768)
- Volume 3: Lights of Nature and Gospel Blended (1777)

The author's intention is to draw up "a scheme of nature and the fundamentals of natural religion, founded upon the basis of experience and observations resulting therefrom". His work contains many psychological and more strictly metaphysical discussions, but it is chiefly in connexion with ethics that Tucker's speculations are best remembered. In important points he anticipated the utilitarianism of William Paley, who expressed obligations to his predecessor. "Every man's own satisfaction" Tucker held to be the ultimate end of action; and satisfaction or pleasure is one and the same in kind, however much it may vary in degree. This universal motive is further connected, as by Paley, through the will of God, with the "general good, the root where out all our rules of conduct and sentiments of honour are to branch."

The Light of Nature Pursued was republished with a biographical sketch by Tucker's grandson Sir Henry St John-Mildmay, 3rd Baronet (1805, other editions 1831, 1834, &c.), and an abridged edition by William Hazlitt appeared in 1807.
