= Robert Henley, 2nd Earl of Northington =

British politician (1747-1786)

The Right Honourable The Earl of Northington KT PC
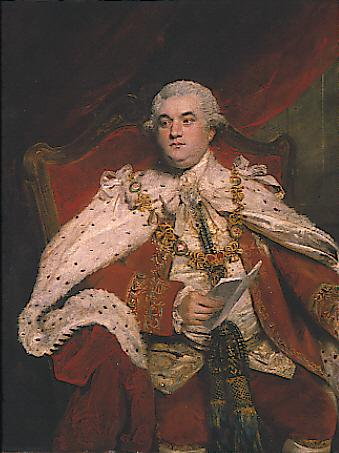

Lord Lieutenant of Ireland
- In office 3 May 1783 – 12 February 1784
- Preceded by: The Earl Temple
- Succeeded by: The Duke of Rutland

Arms of the Earl of Northington: Quarterly: 1st and 4th: Azure, a lion rampant argent ducally crowned or a bordure of the second charged with eight torteaux (Henley); 2nd and 3rd: Argent, three battering rams proper armed and garnished azure (Bertie).

Robert Henley, 2nd Earl of Northington (3 January 1747 – 5 July 1786), was a British politician.

He was born the eldest son of Robert Henley, 1st Earl of Northington, and educated at Westminster School and Christ Church, Oxford. He succeeded his father to the earldom in 1772, inheriting The Grange, Northington.

He was appointed a Teller of the Exchequer in 1763, a position he held until his death. He was also Clerk of the hanaper for life from 1771.

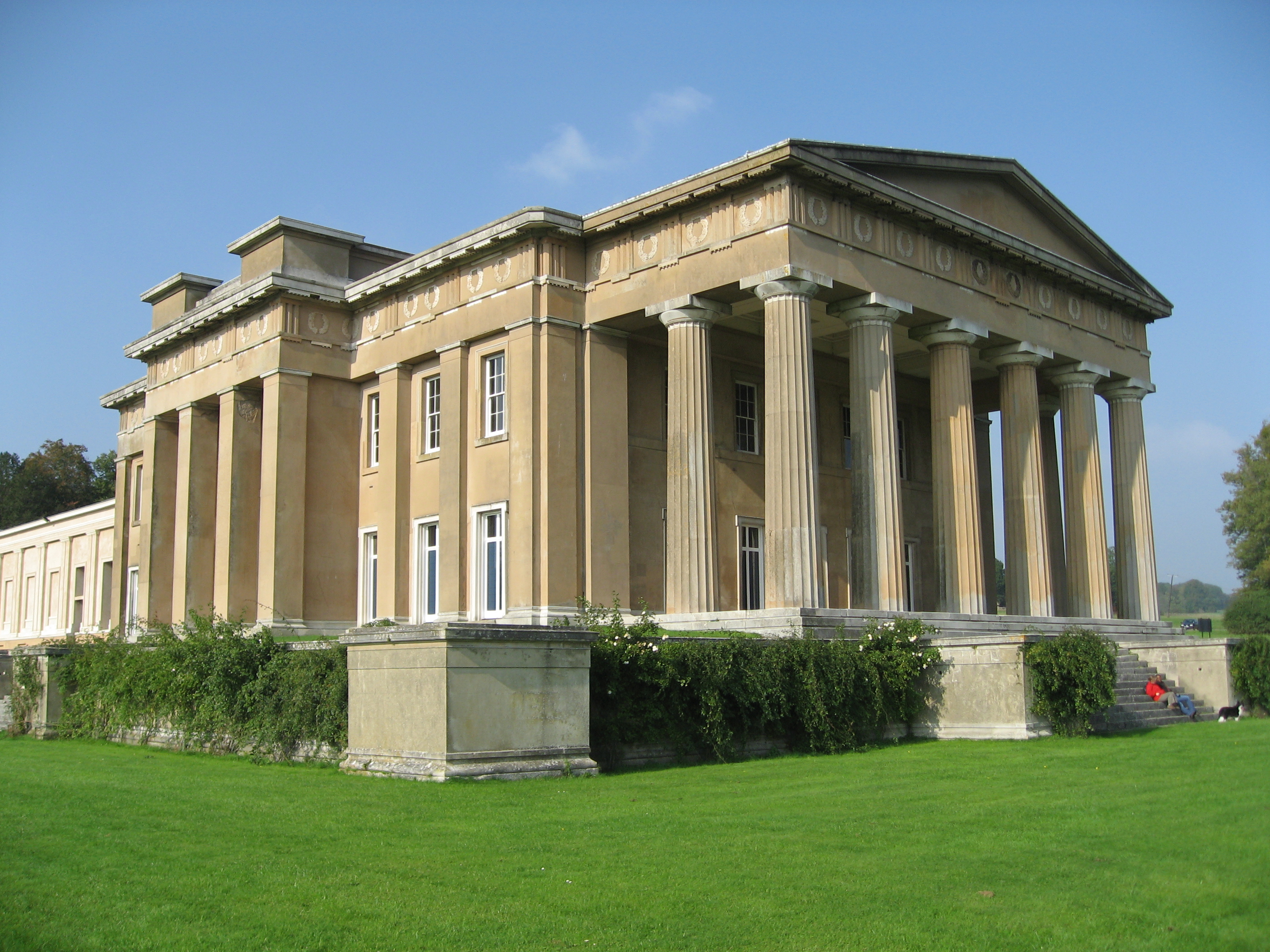
The Grange, Northington

He was elected a Member of Parliament (MP) for Hampshire on 30 March 1768, and sat until succeeding as 2nd Earl of Northington on 14 January 1772, when he moved to the House of Lords. He was made a Knight of the Thistle on 18 August 1773. In 1783 he served as Lord Lieutenant of Ireland in the Fox-North Coalition, being appointed a member of the Privy Council on 30 April. A 1787 portrait by Joshua Reynolds is in the Art Gallery of South Australia.

On his death, unmarried and without a male heir, at the age of thirty-nine, his titles became extinct. His sisters (Lady Bridget Tollemache, Lady Jane Aston, Mary, Dowager Countess Ligonier, and Lady Elizabeth Eden) inherited his estates. They sold The Grange to the Drummond banking family.

Parliament of the United Kingdom
Preceded by Sir Richard Mill, Bt; Sir Simeon Stuart, Bt	Member of Parliament for Hampshire; 1768–1772; With: Sir Simeon Stuart, Bt	Succeeded by Sir Henry St John, Bt; Sir Simeon Stuart, Bt
Political offices
Preceded by The Earl Waldegrave	Teller of the Exchequer; 1763–1786	Succeeded by The Lord Thurlow
Peerage of Great Britain
Preceded by Robert Henley	Earl of Northington; 1772–1786	Extinct
Peerage of Great Britain
Preceded by Robert Henley	Baron Henley; 1772–1786	Extinct
