= Blake baronets of Langham (1772) =

Escutcheon of the Blake baronets of Langham

The Blake baronetcy, of Langham in the County of Suffolk, was created in the Baronetage of Great Britain on 8 October 1772 for Patrick Blake, Member of Parliament for Sudbury, of the West India Interest. The title became extinct on the death of the 6th Baronet in 1975, leaving no heir.

== Blake baronets, of Langham (1772) ==
- Sir Patrick Blake, 1st Baronet (c. 1742–1784)
- Sir Patrick Blake, 2nd Baronet (c. 1768–1818)
- Sir James Henry Blake, 3rd Baronet (1770–1832)
- Sir Henry Charles Blake, 4th Baronet (1794–1880)
- Sir Patrick James Graham Blake, 5th Baronet (1861–1930)
- Sir Cuthbert Patrick Blake, 6th Baronet (1885–1975)

== Notes ==
Baronetage of Great Britain
Preceded by Cocks baronets	Blake baronets of Langham; 8 October 1772	Succeeded by St John baronets
