= Thomas Mildmay (disambiguation) =

Thomas Mildmay (c. 1540–1608) was a courtier and politician.

Thomas Mildmay may also refer to:

- Sir Thomas Mildmay, 1st Baronet (c. 1573–1626), MP for Maldon 1593
- Thomas Mildmay (died 1566), MP for Bodmin October 1553, Loswithiel 1559 and Helston 1547, March 1553, 1555 and 1558
