= Robert Henley, 1st Earl of Northington =

English politician (c. 1708 – 1772)

The Right Honourable The Earl of Northington PC MP
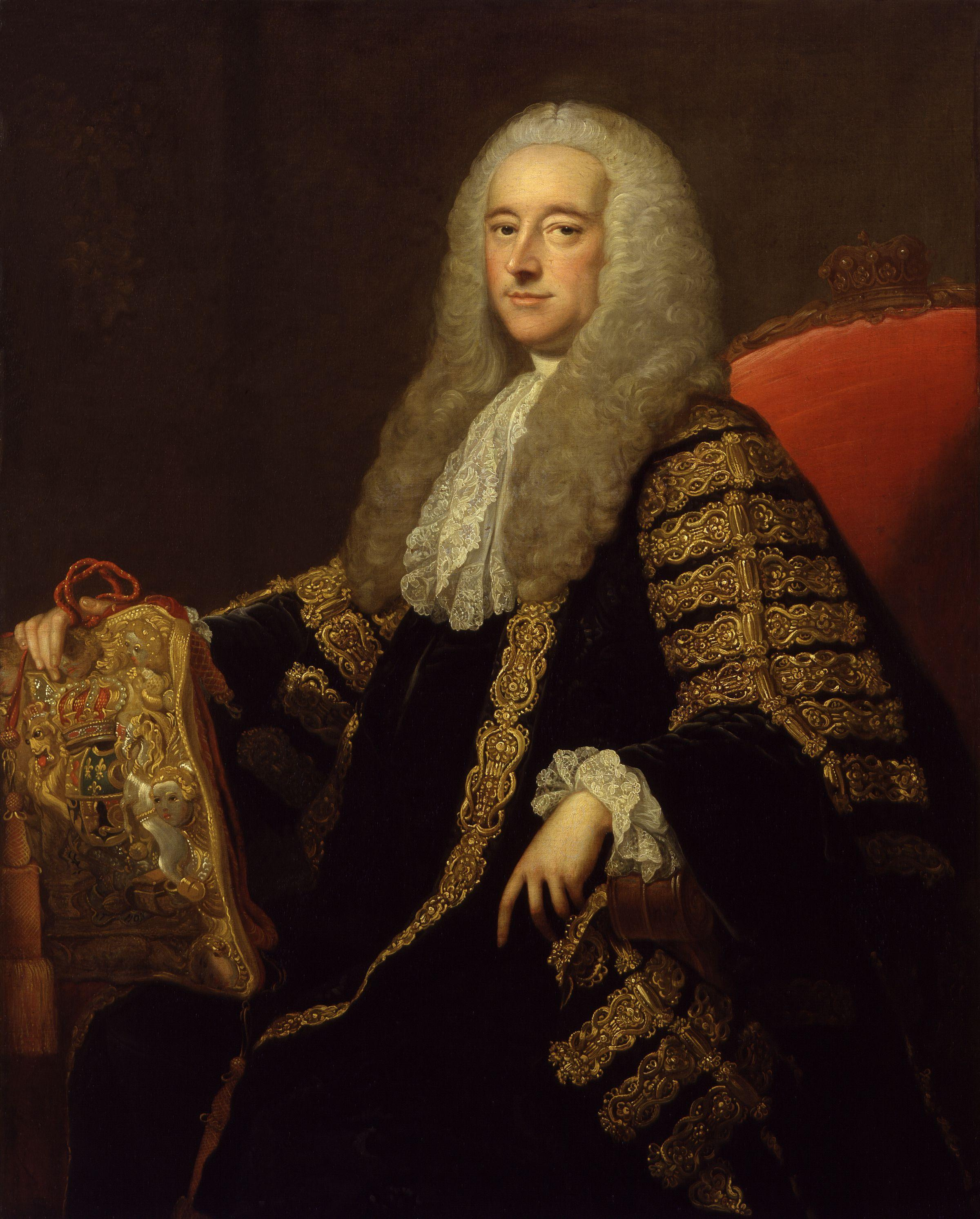
- Portrait by Thomas Hudson, 1761–1772

Lord Keeper of the Great Seal Lord High Steward for the trial of: List: The Earl Ferrers
- In office 30 June 1757 – 16 January 1761
- Monarchs: George II; George III
- Prime Minister: The Duke of Newcastle
- Preceded by: In Commission
- Succeeded by: himself as Lord Chancellor

Lord Chancellor Lord High Steward for the trial of: List: The Lord Byron
- In office 16 January 1761 – 30 July 1766
- Monarch: George III
- Prime Minister: The Duke of Newcastle; The Earl of Bute; George Grenville; The Marquess of Rockingham
- Preceded by: himself as Lord Keeper
- Succeeded by: The Lord Camden

Lord President of the Council
- In office 30 July 1766 – 22 December 1767
- Monarch: George III
- Prime Minister: The Earl of Chatham
- Preceded by: The Earl of Winchilsea and Nottingham
- Succeeded by: The Earl Gower

Personal details
- Born: 1708 Hampshire
- Died: 14 January 1772 (aged 63–64) Hampshire
- Party: Whig Party
- Spouse: Jane Huband
- Children: 8
- Parent: Anthony Henley

Arms of the Earl of Northington: Quarterly: 1st and 4th: Azure, a lion rampant argent ducally crowned or a bordure of the second charged with eight torteaux (Henley); 2nd and 3rd: Argent, three battering rams proper armed and garnished azure (Bertie).

Robert Henley, 1st Earl of Northington PC MP (c. 1708 – 14 January 1772) was the Lord High Chancellor of Great Britain. He was a member of the Whig Party in the parliament and was known for his wit and writing.

== Family ==
Born the second son of Anthony Henley, Robert Henley was from a wealthy family in Hampshire. His grandfather, Sir Robert Henley, had been Master of the Court of the King's Bench, essentially a defence counsel.

Henley's father Anthony Henley was educated at Oxford and interested in literature. When he moved to London, he became the friend of the Earls of Dorset and Sunderland, as well as a friend of Swift, Pope, and Burnet. After becoming a married man, Anthony Henley had been the Member of Parliament for Andover in 1698. He died in August, 1711 and was succeeded in turn by his eldest son, Anthony and his second son, Robert.

== Early life ==
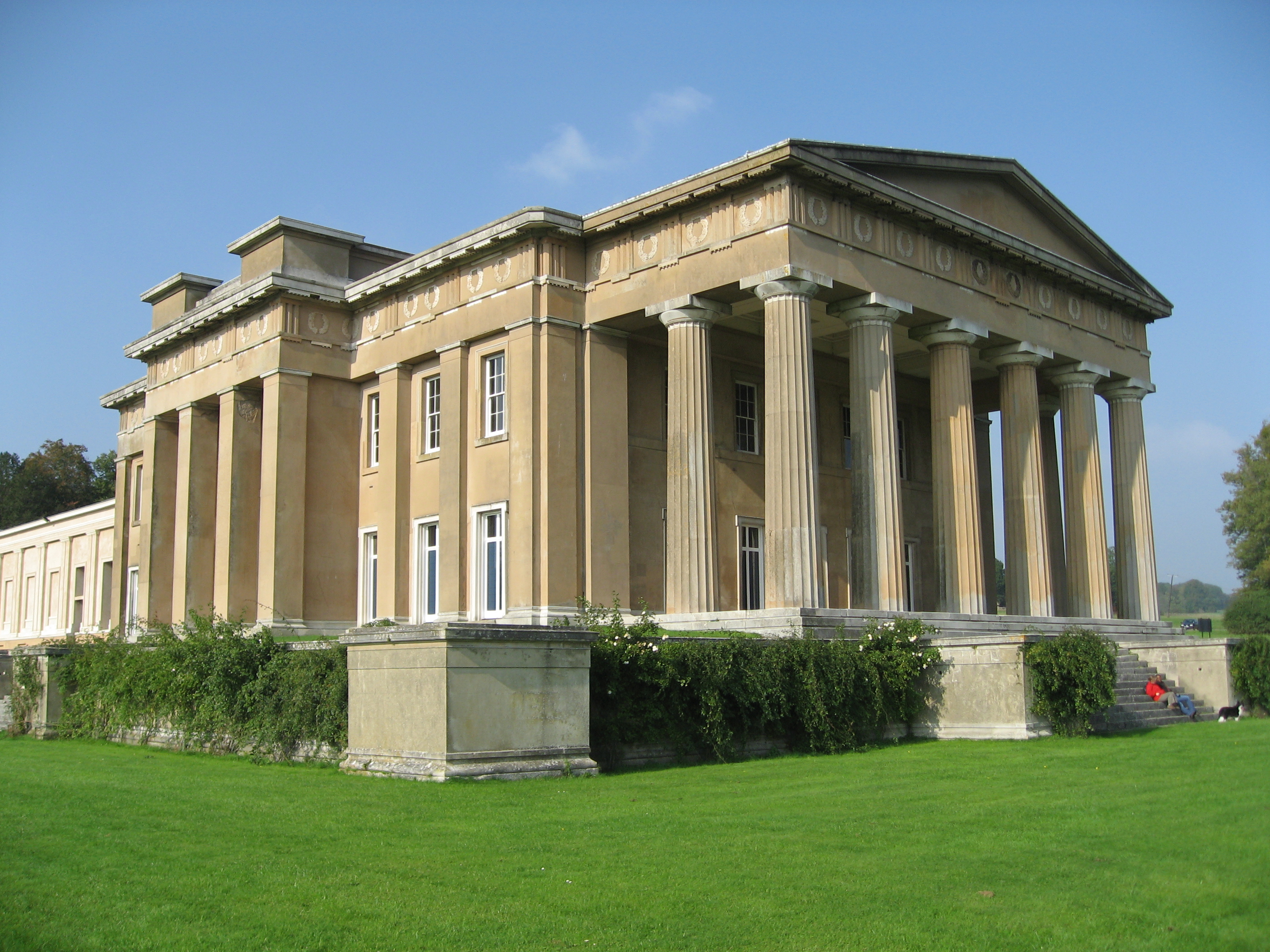
The Grange, Northington

Henley was educated at Westminster School and attended St. John's College, Oxford. He gained a fellowship at All Souls College, Oxford in 1727, entered the Inner Temple to study law in 1729 and was called to the bar on 23 June 1732. He succeeded his elder brother in 1746, inheriting The Grange, Northington in Hampshire which had been built for his grandfather by Inigo Jones.

== Career ==
He was elected a Member of Parliament for Bath in 1747 and became Recorder of the town in 1751. He was appointed Attorney General and knighted in 1756 and promoted the next year to Lord Keeper of the Great Seal, the last person to receive this title. Although as Lord Keeper he presided over the House of Lords, he was not made a peer until 1760 when he became Baron Henley of Grange in the County of Southampton. When George III ascended to power, Henley was appointed Lord High Chancellor of Great Britain in 1761 and made Earl of Northington in 1764.

The delay in raising him to the peerage was due to the hostility of George II, who resented Henley's former support of the Prince of Wales's faction, known as the Leicester House party; and it was in order that he might preside as Lord High Steward at the trial of the Earl Ferrers for murder in 1760 that he then received his patent. He resigned from his position in 1767 and died at his residence in Hampshire on 14 January 1772.

== Personal life ==
In 1743, Henley had married Jane Huband who was the daughter of Sir John Huband of Ipsley of Warwickshire. He had three sons and five daughters. The names of his daughters were:

- Catherine Henley (d. 9 Jan 1779);
- Bridget Henley (d. 13 March 1796), married Robert Lane
- Jane Henley (d. February 1823);
- Lady Elizabeth Henley (d. 20 August 1821);
- Mary Henley (1753–1814),

Henley was succeeded by his son Robert Henley, 2nd Earl of Northington.

== Cases ==
- Vernon v Bethell (1762) 28 ER 838, "necessitous men are not, truly speaking, free men, but, to answer a present exigency, will submit to any terms that the crafty may impose upon them."
- Shanley v Harvey (1763) 2 Eden 126, 127, as "soon as a man sets foot on English ground he is free".
- Brown v Peck (1758) 1 Eden 140, provisions discouraging cohabitation were void against public policy, as where a will promised £5 a month to a beneficiary to split up from her husband, or £2 otherwise. She was entitled to the £5.
- Hussey v. Dillon 2 Amb 603, 604, testament and meaning of "grandchildren"
- 1 Eden 5, "The Court has always in cases of this nature considered the question of consent with great latitude, adhering to the spirit and not the letter. The maxim Qui tacet satis loquitur has therefore been respected, and constructive consents have been looked upon as entitled to as much regard as if conveyed in express terms".
- Earl of Buckinghamshire v Drury
- Pike v Hoare, 2 Eden, 182; Amb. 428, on conflict of laws, a will affecting lands in the Colonies "is not triable" in this country.
- Burgess v Wheate 1 Eden, 251

== Notes ==
Legal offices
| Preceded by William Murray | Attorney General for England and Wales; 1756–1757 | Succeeded by Sir Charles Pratt |
Political offices
| Preceded by In commission | Lord Keeper of the Great Seal; 1757–1761 | Succeeded by The Lord Camden |
| Preceded by In commission | Lord High Chancellor of Great Britain; 1761–1766 | Succeeded by The Lord Camden |
| Preceded by The Earl of Winchilsea and Nottingham | Lord President of the Council; 1766–1767 | Succeeded by The Earl Gower |
Honorary titles
| Preceded by Marquess of Carnarvon | Lord Lieutenant of Hampshire; 1764–1771 | Succeeded by The Duke of Chandos |
Peerage of Great Britain
| New creation | Earl of Northington; 1764–1772 | Succeeded by Robert Henley |
| New creation | Baron Henley; 1760–1772 | Succeeded by Robert Henley |
