= Sir Henry St John-Mildmay, 4th Baronet =

English politician

The Right Honourable Sir Henry St John-Mildmay, Bt
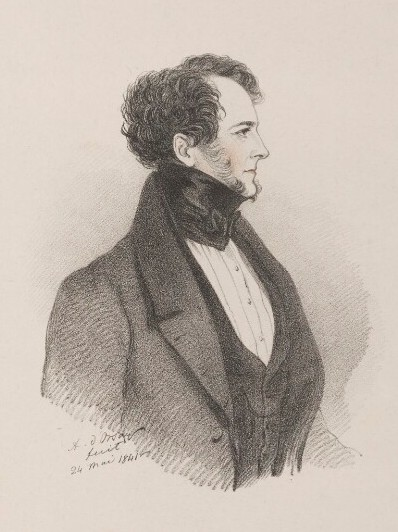

Member of Parliament for Winchester
- In office 1807–1818 Serving with Richard Grace Gamon, Richard Meyler
- Preceded by: Sir Henry St John-Mildmay, Bt; Richard Grace Gamon
- Succeeded by: James Henry Leigh; Richard Meyler

Personal details
- Born: Henry St John Carew St John-Mildmay; 15 April 1787
- Died: 17 January 1848 (aged 60)
- Spouse(s): Charlotte Bouverie (m. 1809; died 1810) Harriet Primrose, Countess of Rosebery (m. 1815; died 1848)
- Parent(s): Sir Henry St John-Mildmay, 3rd Baronet; Jane Mildmay
- Education: Winchester School; Christ Church, Oxford

Sir Henry St John Carew St John-Mildmay, 4th Baronet (15 April 1787 – 17 January 1848), of Dogmersfield Park, Hampshire, was an English politician.

== Early life ==
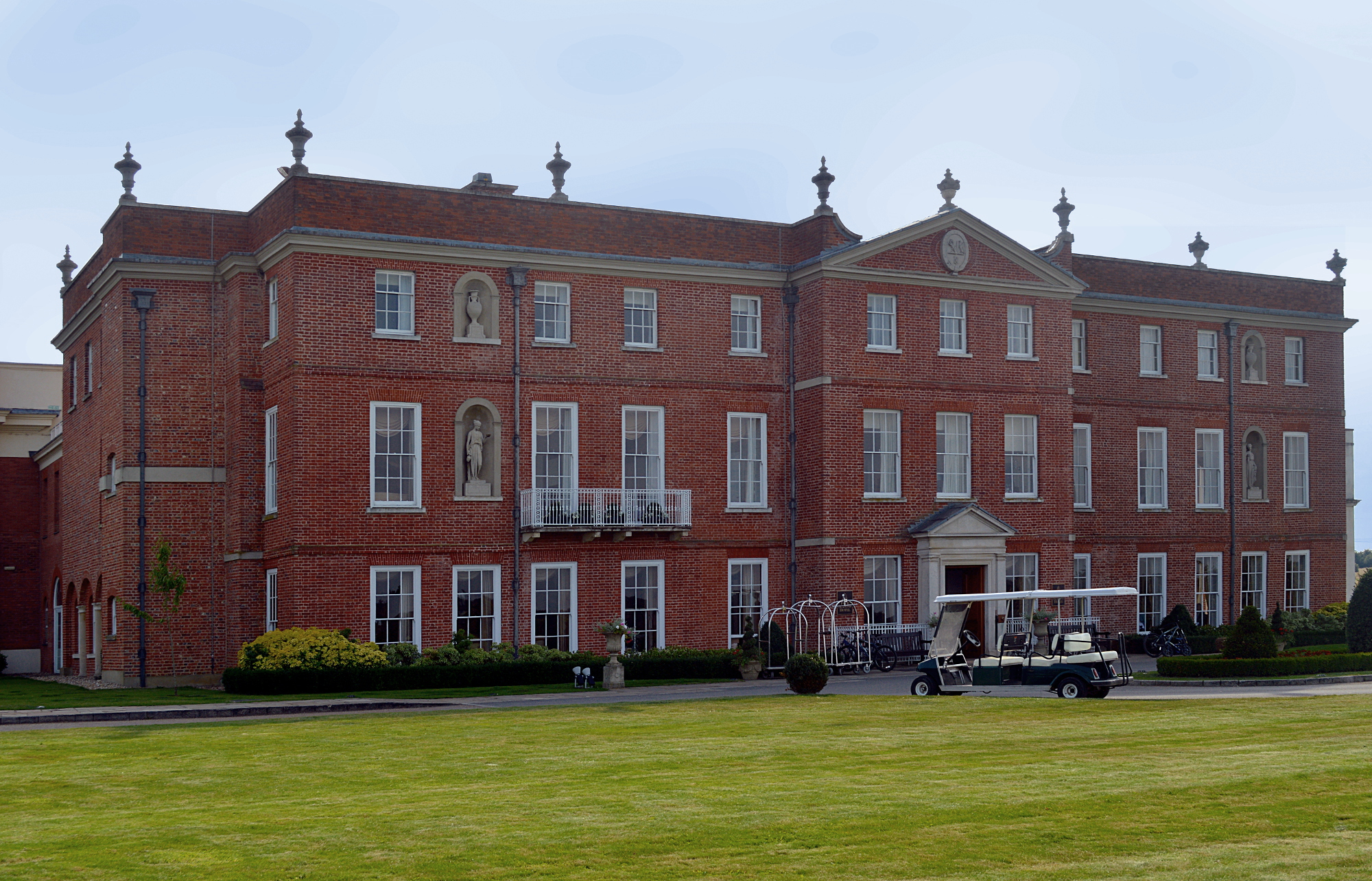
Dogmersfield Park, the St John Mildmay seat

St John-Mildmay was born on 15 April 1787. He was the son of Sir Henry St John-Mildmay, 3rd Baronet of Dogmersfield Park and Jane Mildmay, the daughter and co-heiress of Carew Mildmay of Shawford House, Hampshire.

He was educated at Winchester School from 1798 to 1802, and Christ Church, Oxford, graduating in 1805.

== Career ==
He was a Member of Parliament (MP) for Winchester 1807–1818 and Mayor of Winchester for 1808.

He succeeded his father in the baronetcy on 11 November 1808.

== Personal life ==
On 7 August 1809 he married Charlotte Bouverie, the daughter of Hon. Bartholomew Bouverie and Mary Wyndham Arundell. Before her death following childbirth, they were the parents of one son:

- Sir Henry Bouverie Paulet (1810–1902), who married Hon. Helena Shaw-Lefevre, daughter of Charles Shaw-Lefevre, 1st Viscount Eversley, in 1851.

In 1815, five years after Charlotte's death from giving birth to their son, he eloped with her sister Harriet, Countess of Rosebery (née Bouverie), the wife of Archibald Primrose, 4th Earl of Rosebery in Stuttgart, Württemberg. Before Harriet eventually left him, they had three sons:

- Edmund Henry St John-Mildmay (1815–1905), who married Louisa Josephine Saunders, former wife of Sir Henry de Hoghton, 9th Baronet. After her death in 1865, he married his cousin, Augusta Jane St John-Mildmay, daughter of the Ven. Carew Antony St John-Mildmay.
- Horace Osborne St John-Mildmay (1817–1866), an officer in the 5th Austrian Hussars; he married Jane Dombach in 1844.
- Augustus Fitzwalter St John-Mildmay (d. 1839), an officer in the 7th Austrian Hussars; he died unmarried.

Plagued by financial problems, he shot himself on 17 January 1848.

Parliament of the United Kingdom
| Preceded by Sir Henry St John-Mildmay, Bt; Richard Grace Gamon | Member of Parliament for Winchester; 1807–1818; With: Richard Grace Gamon 1807–1812; Richard Meyler 1812–1818 | Succeeded by James Henry Leigh; Richard Meyler |
Baronetage of Great Britain
| Preceded by Henry St John-Mildmay | Baronet (of Farley); 1808–1848 | Succeeded by Henry St John-Mildmay |
