= Sir Henry St John-Mildmay, 5th Baronet =

English aristocrat and army officer (1810–1902)

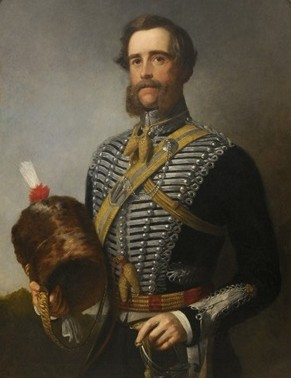
Sir Henry St John-Mildmay, 5th Baronet

Sir Henry Bouverie Paulet St John-Mildmay, 5th Baronet (31 July 1810 – 16 July 1902), of Dogmersfield Park, Hampshire, was an English landowner and British Army officer.

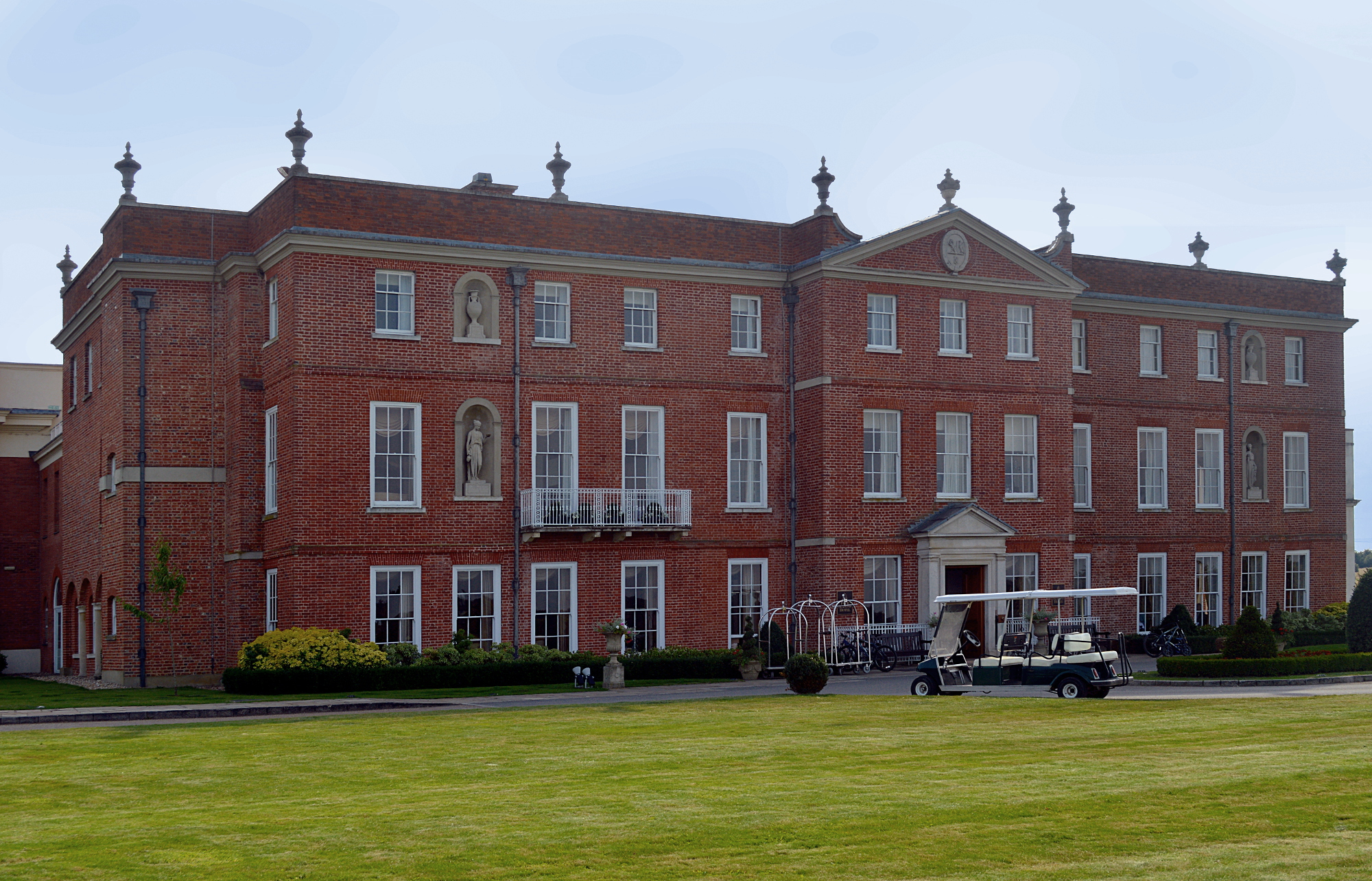
Dogmersfield Park - the St John-Mildmay seat

== Biography ==
St John-Mildmay was born in 1810, the son of Sir Henry St John-Mildmay, 4th Baronet and Charlotte Bouverie, who died on 5 August 1810. He succeeded his father as baronet on 17 January 1848.

He was commissioned an officer in the 2nd Dragoon Guards, where he advanced to major before he resigned. He was later Commanding Officer and later Honorary Colonel of the North Hampshire Yeomanry. Serving as High Sheriff of Hampshire in 1862, he was also a Deputy Lieutenant of the county.

Sir Henry St John-Mildmay died at Dogmersfield Park on 16 July 1902. He was succeeded by his eldest son Henry Paulet St John-Mildmay.

== Family ==
St John-Mildmay married, in 1851, Honourable Helena Shaw Lefevre, daughter of Charles Shaw-Lefevre, 1st Viscount Eversley by his wife Emma Laura Whitbread. Lady St John-Mildmay died in 1897. They had seven children, of whom two daughters died young:

- Jane Emma (1851–1928), who married in 1889 James Martin Carr-Lloyd.
- Sir Henry Paulet St John-Mildmay (1853–1916), 6th Baronet
- Helena Charlotte (1854–1867)
- Laura Catherine (1856–1866)
- Constance Mary (1859–1930), who married, firstly in 1888 Sir John Arthur Beach Wallington, KCB (died 1901), and secondly in 1912 Algernon Forbes Randolph CMG DSO.
- Sir Gerald Anthony Shaw-Lefevre-St John-Mildmay, 7th Baronet (1860–1929)
- Rev. Carew Hervey Mary (1863–1937); married Elizabeth Roper, youngest daughter of Sir Henry Roper and Charlotte Lydia Pleydell-Bouverie, granddaughter of Jacob Pleydell-Bouverie, 2nd Earl of Radnor. He was a Catholic convert in 1923.

Baronetage of Great Britain
| Preceded by Henry St John-Mildmay | Baronet (of Farley); 1848–1902 | Succeeded by Henry St John-Mildmay |
