= Enoch Seeman =

British painter

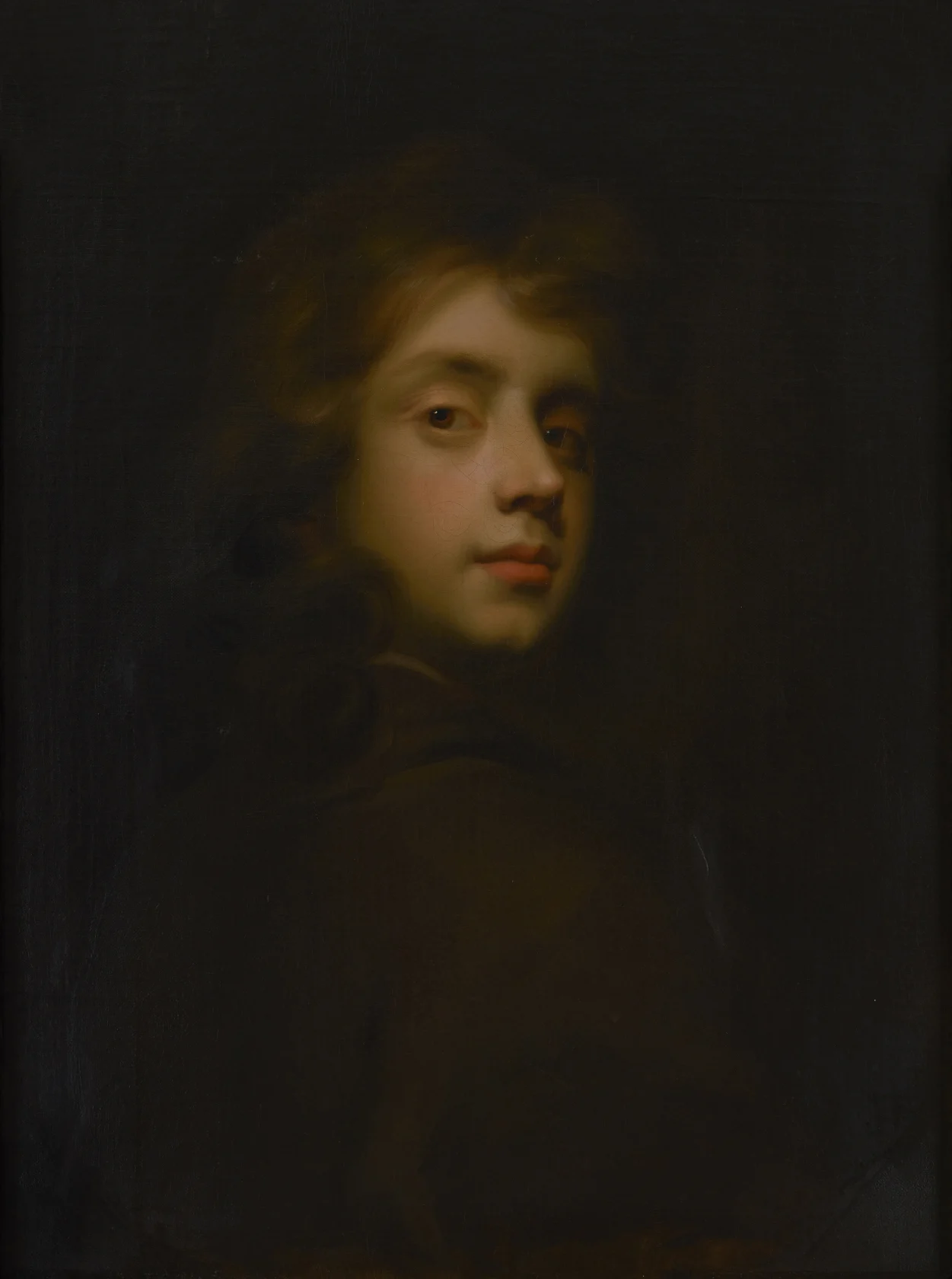
- A self-portrait of Seeman made c. 1710
- Born: c. 1689; Gdańsk, Kingdom of Poland
- Died: 1745; London, Kingdom of Great Britain
- Occupation: painter

Enoch Seeman the Younger (c. 1689 – April 1745) was a British painter who was active during the first half of the Georgian era. He was born into a family of painters in Gdańsk, Poland.

== Career ==
Seeman was brought to London from Danzig (Gdańsk) by his father, also Enoch (born circa 1660), in around 1704. The earliest known painting by the younger Seeman is a group portrait of the Bisset family in the style of the portraitist Godfrey Kneller, now held at Castle Forbes in Grampian, Scotland, and dated by an inscription to 1708.

As a painter to the British royal court, Seeman the Younger completed coronation portraits of George II and his wife Queen Caroline of Ansbach in around 1730. These pictures are held at Windsor Castle in Berkshire, England, as part of the Royal Collection.

In 1734, Seeman painted a portrait of Jane Pratt Taylor, daughter of Lord Chief Justice John Pratt. The portrait was sent to William Byrd, II of Westover, in Virginia, where it became part of the largest colonial portrait collection of the early eighteenth century. The painting is now part of the collection of the Virginia Historical Society.

The Metropolitan Museum in New York, US, owns his rendering of Sir James Dashwood, described by the Grove Dictionary of Art as 'Exceptionally lively'. Also by Seeman the younger are a 1739 portrait of Abraham Tucker, held by the National Portrait Gallery, London, and various copies of sixteenth- and seventeenth-century portraits. The National Trust owns two examples of this set of his work – at Dunham Massey in Cheshire, England, a copy of a portrait of Lady Diana Cecil, and at Belton House in Lincolnshire, England, of Lady Cust and her nine children. His portrait of Lady Caroline D'Arcy, Countess of Ancram, wife of the Earl of Ancram, sold at Christie's in 2000 for £11,750. It had previously been owned by George Osborne, 10th Duke of Leeds and hung in the dining room at Hornby Castle.

A portrait of George I held at Middle Temple was previously attributed to Seeman the Younger but it has now been established that it was painted by his father, Enoch Seeman the Elder. It is also almost certain that the 1717 portrait of Elihu Yale held by Yale University Art Gallery is not by Seeman the Younger, as attributed, but also by his father.

Despite royal commissions, Seeman the younger's work is thought of as less accomplished than that of the top flight of portraitists because of his lesser attention to detail in the facial features of different sitters. This is more apparent in male than in female subjects of Seeman's.

Seeman the younger died in London in April 1745.

== Gallery ==
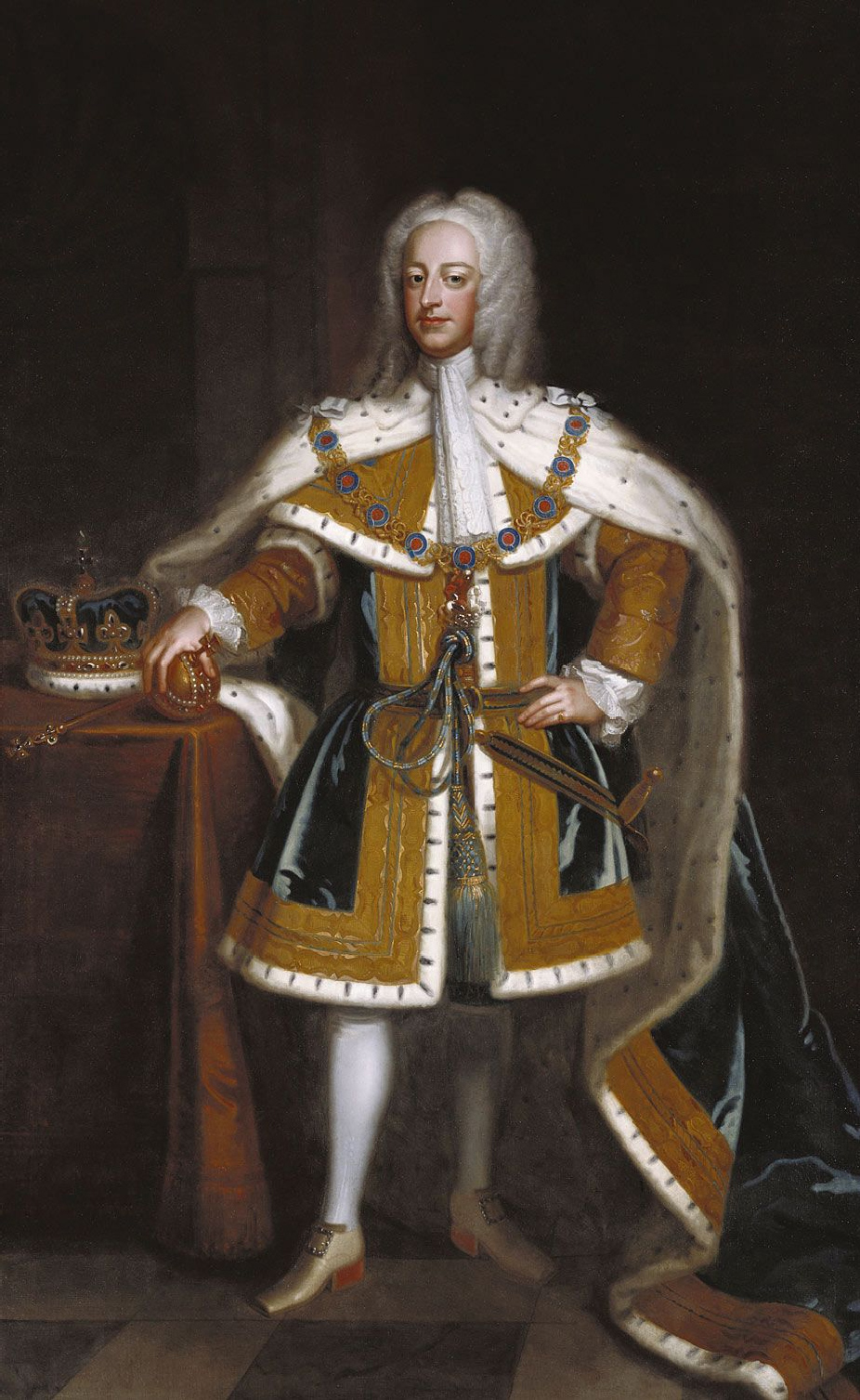
George II of Great Britain

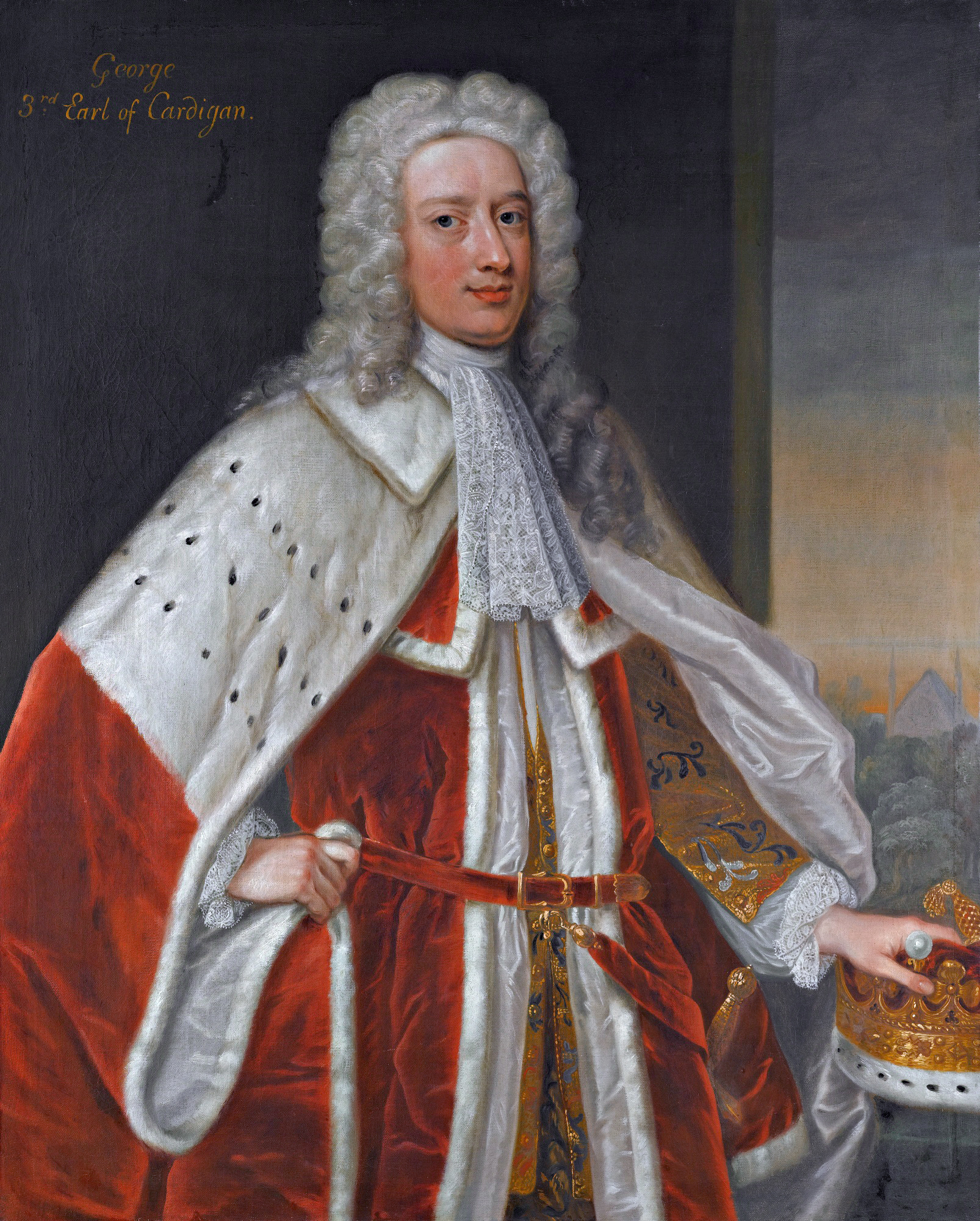
George Brudenell, 3rd Earl of Cardigan

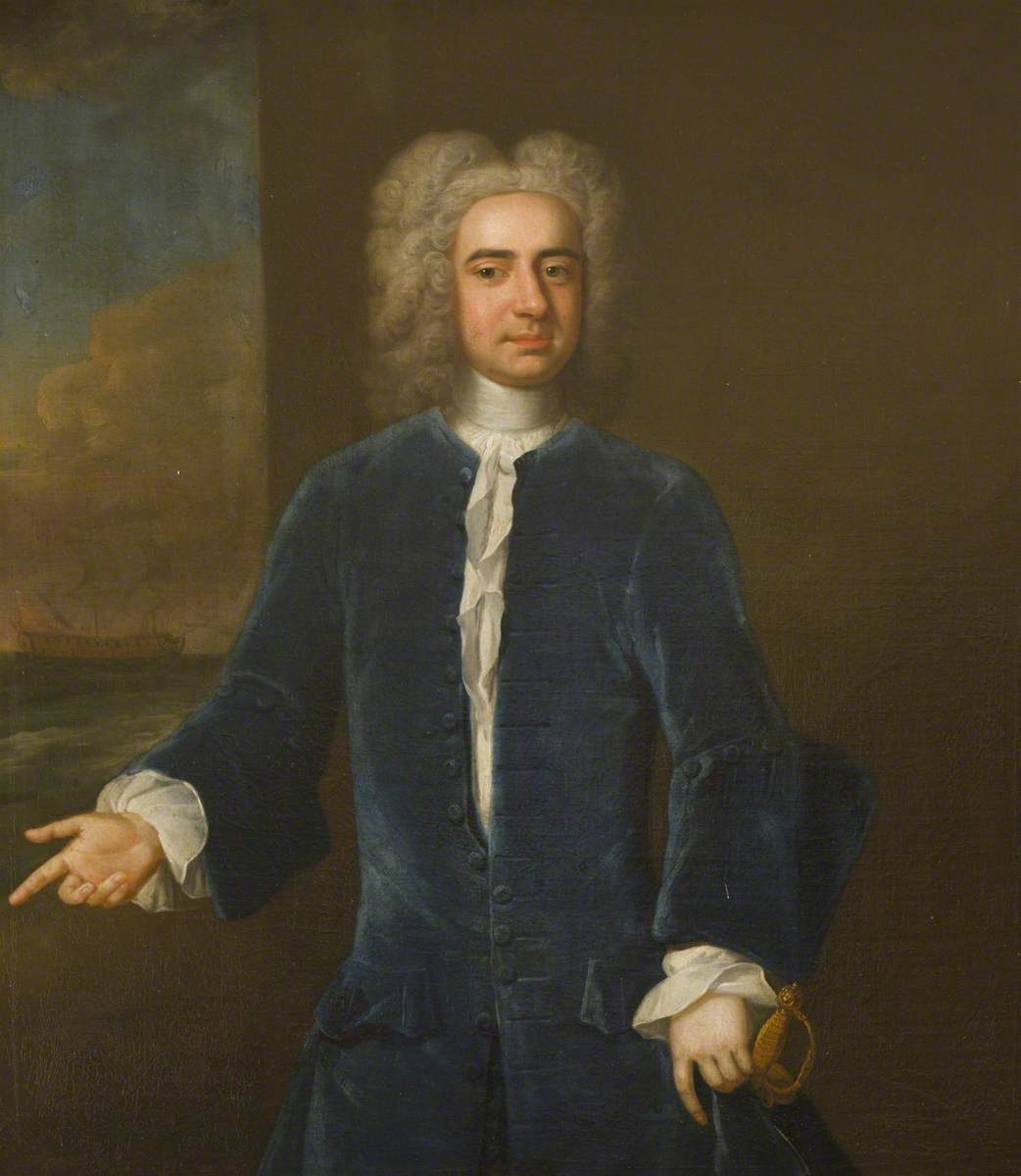
Thomas Davers

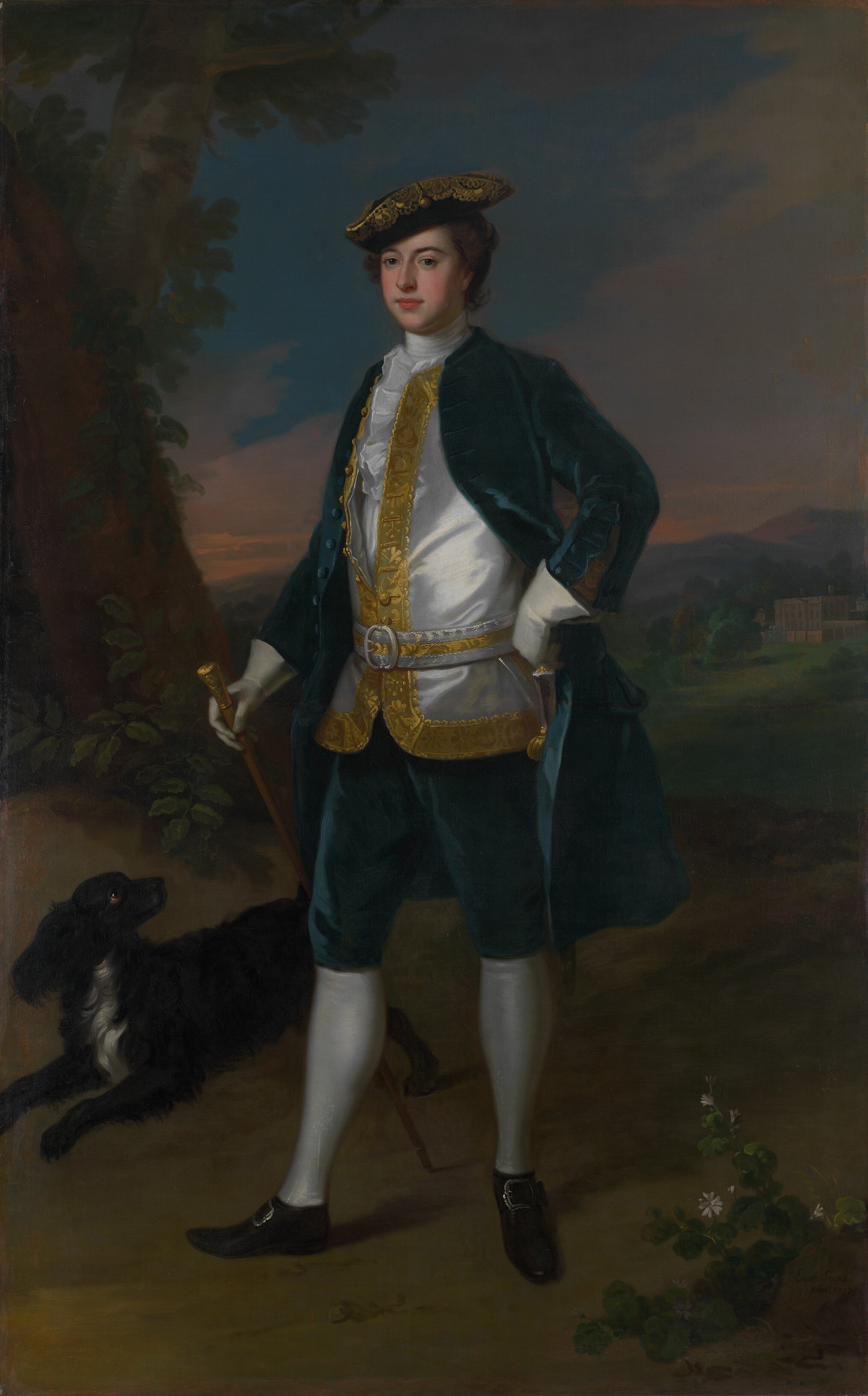
Sir James Dashwood

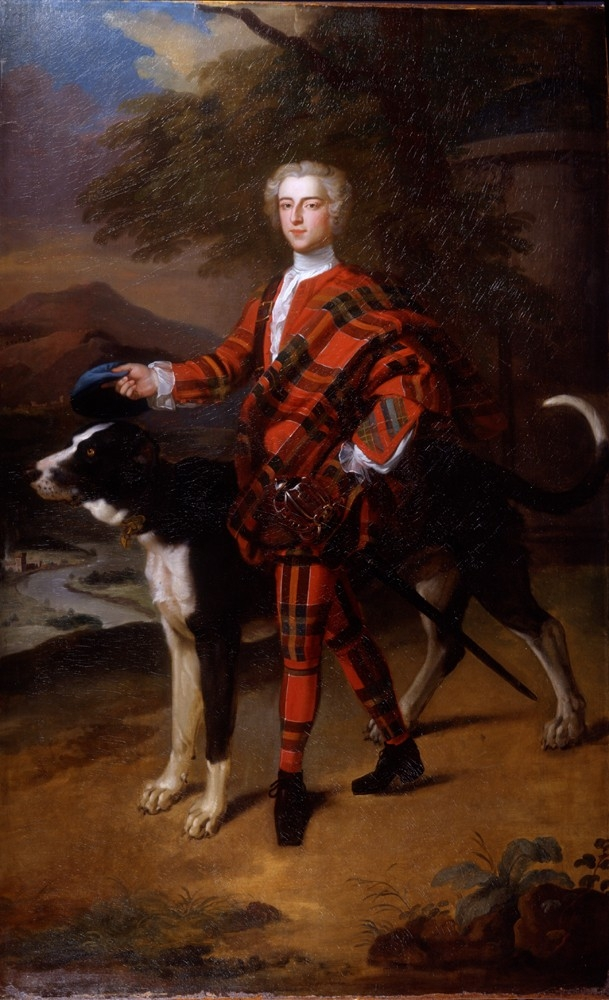
John Campbell, 3rd Earl of Breadalbane and Holland

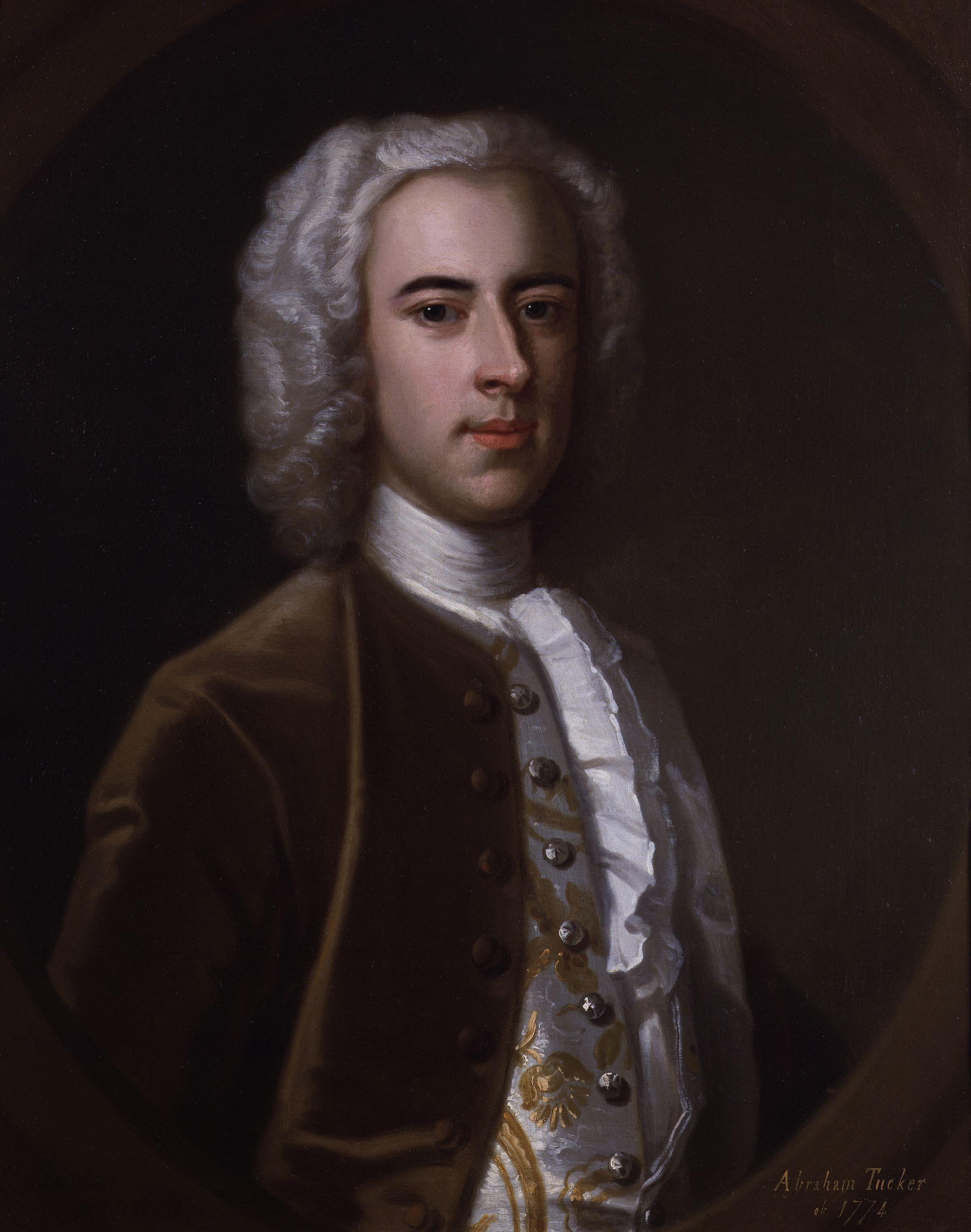
Abraham Tucker

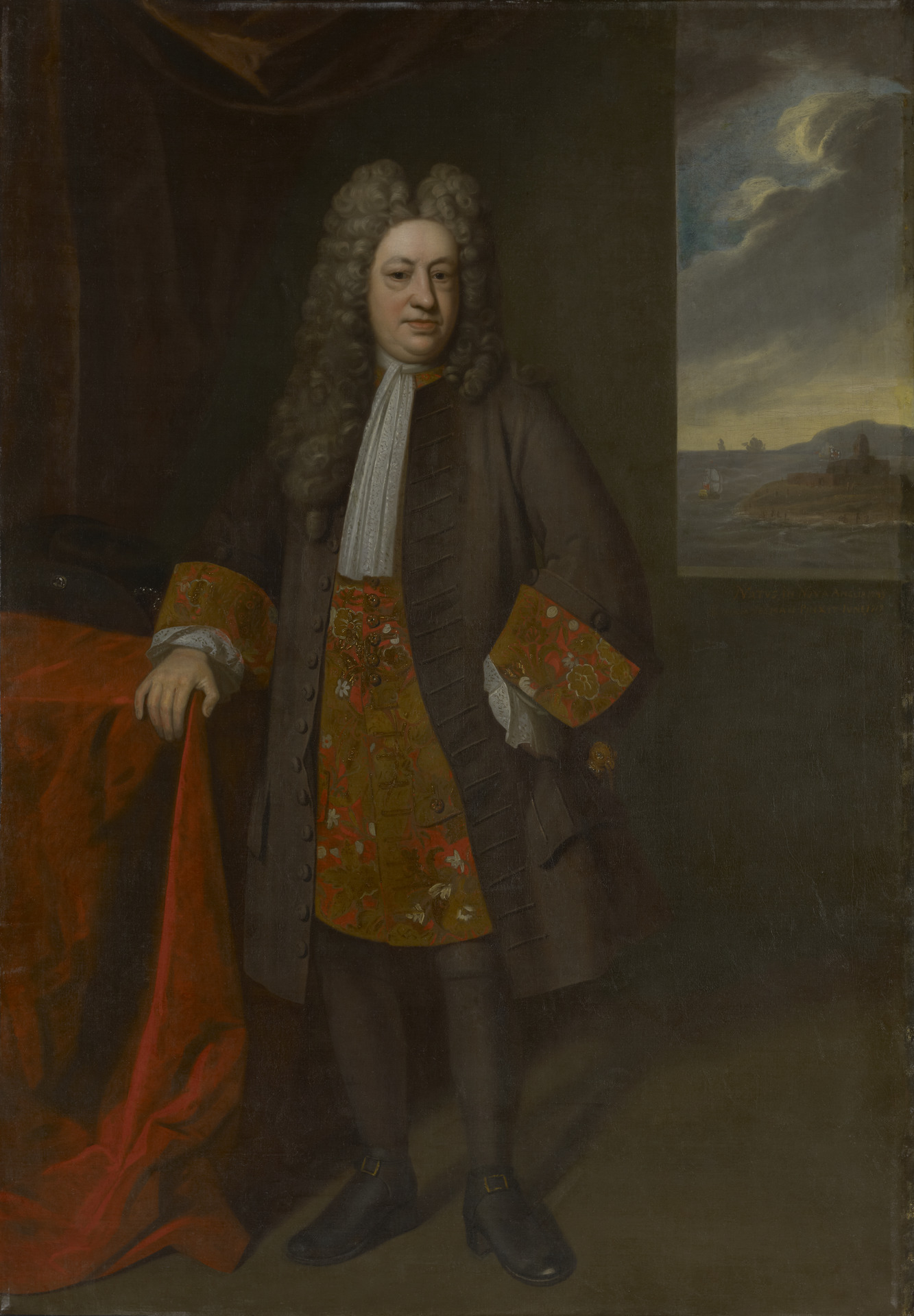
Elihu Yale
