= Sir Simeon Stuart, 3rd Baronet =

British politician and Militia officer

Sir Simeon Stuart, 3rd Baronet (c. 1721 – 1779), was a British politician and Militia officer who sat in the House of Commons from 1761 to 1779.

Stuart was born the son of Sir Simeon Stuart, 2nd Baronet and his wife Elizabeth Dereham, daughter of Sir Richard Dereham, 3rd Baronet, and educated at Westminster School between 1734 and 1737. He succeeded to the baronetcy on the death of his father on 11 August 1761 and also succeeded his father as Chamberlain of the Exchequer the same year.

Stuart canvassed for a seat in Parliament for Hampshire for several months from August 1754 but, perceiving he stood no chance, yielded the seat to Lord Winchester when he was also put up. However, in the 1761 general election he was successfully returned as Member of Parliament for Hampshire. He was also re-elected in the 1768 and 1774 general elections.

He was appointed Colonel of the South Hampshire Militia in 1770 and retained the command until his death.

Stuart died on 19 Nov. 1779. He had married Miss Hooke, daughter of Lt.-Col. William Hooke, Governor of Minorca, and was succeeded by his only son Sir Simeon Stuart, 4th Baronet.

Parliament of Great Britain
Preceded by Henry Bilson-Legge; Alexander Thistlethwayte	Member of Parliament for Hampshire; 1761–1779; With: Henry Bilson-Legge; Sir Richard Mill, Bt; Lord Henley; Sir Henry St John, Bt	Succeeded by Sir Henry St John, Bt; Jervoise Clarke Jervoise
Baronetage of England
Preceded by Simeon Stuart	Baronet (of Hartley Mauduit); 1761–1779	Succeeded by Simeon Stuart
