= Mildmay baronets =

Set index for Mildmay baronets

There have been two baronetcies created for persons with the surname Mildmay, one in the Baronetage of England and one in the Baronetage of Great Britain. Both are extinct.

- Mildmay baronets of Moulsham (first creation, 1611): see Sir Thomas Mildmay, 1st Baronet (died 1626)
- Mildmay baronets of Moulsham (second creation, 1765)
