= Anthony Bingham Mildmay, 2nd Baron Mildmay of Flete =

English amateur jockey (1909–1950)

Anthony Bingham Mildmay, 2nd Baron Mildmay of Flete (14 April 1909 – 12 May 1950) was an English amateur steeplechaser, who raced in the Grand National. He also inspired the Queen Mother's interest in National Hunt racing.

== Early life ==
Mildmay was the son of Francis Bingham Mildmay, 1st Baron Mildmay of Flete and his wife Alice Grenfell.

He was educated at St Cyprian's School, Eastbourne, where he was encouraged to ride on the South Downs, and at Eton. He then went up to Trinity College, Cambridge, where he was a member of the University Pitt Club.

He fought in World War II, as an officer in the Welsh Guards, rising to the rank of captain. He succeeded to the title of 2nd Baron Mildmay of Flete on 8 February 1947.

== Steeplechasing ==
"Nitty" Mildmay, a gaunt, stoop-shouldered six-footer, was a well-known and popular amateur steeplechaser. He rode in the Grand National before and after the war, becoming known as a persistent 'trier', despite several episodes of bad luck. In 1933 he rode his first winner called Good Shot at Wye in March but also rode in the National for the first time falling at the first from Youtell.

In 1936, riding he loses his claim to 5lb (15 wins) winning the Boxhill Handicap Chase at Gatwick on Davy Jones. In the Grand National the same year the 100-1 Davy Jones, he was leading at the 2nd to last fence when a buckle on the reins broke and the horse ran out. He shared the amateur championship with Mr R Petre in 1937/38.

Mildmay’s association with Peter Cazalet, a fellow Etonian and established figure in National Hunt racing, became an important part of his career. Their friendship led to a long working relationship in training and riding steeplechasers, based largely at Cazalet’s family home, Fairlawne. Over time, Fairlawne developed into a prominent training establishment, and Cazalet’s racing connections included Queen Elizabeth, who became one of his principal patrons. Mildmay moved to Fairlawne because it provided a practical base for their shared racing interests, and the arrangement continued through Cazalet’s two marriages until Mildmay’s death.

In 1947, he fell at Folkestone Racecourse and injured his neck, which gave rise to a number of disabling attacks of cramp. In the 1948 Grand National, he finished third on his favourite horse Cromwell, after an attack of the cramp meant he was just a passenger.

During his career, he rode 197 winners from 1,037 rides under National Hunt Rules. His highest was 38 winners in 1949/50 season. He was the Leading Amateur 4 times and shared the title in 1937/38. He rode eight winners at Cheltenham, including three at The Festival. His final winner was on his own good hunter chaser Prince Brownie at the now defunct Kent racecourse of Wye on Monday 8 May 1950. His final ride was in the following Handicap Hurdle when he was placed 5th riding Peter Cazalet's Lady Beware "making up a lot of late ground".

However, Mildmay's most notable legacy was probably in kindling an interest in jump-racing in the Queen Mother. At a dinner in Windsor Castle in 1949, Mildmay sat next to the Queen and persuaded her that he should buy her a horse, to share with her daughter, Princess Elizabeth. Mildmay's trainer Peter Cazalet selected Monaveen for them. Monaveen won his first race for them, at Fontwell Park, finished second in the Grand Sefton Chase at Aintree, and then took the prestigious Queen Elizabeth Chase at Hurst Park. The result was a passion for the sport that lasted the Queen Mother for the rest of her life.

== Early death ==
In 1950, Mildmay suffered an attack of cramp while swimming off the south Devon coast. He drowned at the age of 41.

He was unmarried and the title became extinct.

== Commemoration ==
Mildmay left his horses to his old racing and wartime colleague Peter Cazalet. Among them was Manicou, which became the Queen Mother's second steeplechaser.

The Times called him "The Last of the Corinthians" and wrote: "there never was a harder rider, a better loser or a more popular winner: and though he has always valued the race more than the victory and the victory more than the prize, he would not perhaps have disdained the reward he has won - which is a kind of immortality among the English".

He was commemorated in several events initiated by his friends. These include: the Mildmay of Flete Handicap Chase at Cheltenham Racecourse, the Mildmay Stakes at Newton Abbot Racecourse, and the Anthony Mildmay, Peter Cazalet Memorial Chase at Sandown Park Racecourse.These races have all now changed their names. The Grade 2 Mildmay Novices 'Chase is run at Aintree over the Mildmay Course on the 2nd day of the Grand National Meeting.

He was commemorated in The Mildmay Course at Aintree Racecourse, which opened in memory of him, in 1953.Aintree Liverpool Grand National History . The Mildmay course at Aintree was designed by Lord Mildmay and Sir John Crocker Bulteel to introduce novice horses to Aintree. The original layout of the track had mini National fences designed to introduce horses to the type of fences seen on the Grand National Course itself. However they were never all that popular with trainers and fields over the course tended to be small. At the time Aintree staged NH only meetings in December and January. After the mid-1960s when only the National meeting took place at Aintree the Mildmay course was only used once a year for a 2-mile Novices 'Chase called the Mildmay Novices 'Chase. A 2m Novices 'Chase is still run at Aintree on Grand National Day now a Grade 1 race called the Maghull Novices 'Chase. The mini National fences were replaced by conventional birch Steeplechase fences in 1975 the year in which flat racing ceased at Aintree. In 1990 the layout of the Mildmay Course was changed.

P.G. Wodehouse cited Mildmay as "very much the type" of the character of Bertie Wooster, but as the first Bertie Wooster stories appeared in 1916, when Mildmay was only seven, he cannot have been the inspiration as is sometimes claimed.

Peerage of the United Kingdom
Preceded by Francis Mildmay	Baron Mildmay of Flete; 1947–1950	Extinct
