= Baron Mildmay of Flete =

Extinct barony in the Peerage of the United Kingdom

Arms of Mildmay: Argent, three lions rampant azure

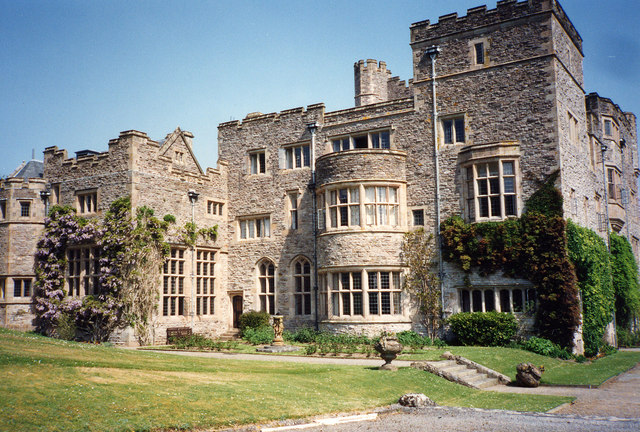
Flete House, the seat of the Barons Mildmay of Flete.

Baron Mildmay of Flete, of Totnes in the County of Devon, was a title in the Peerage of the United Kingdom. It was created on 20 November 1922 for Francis Mildmay, for many years Member of Parliament for Totnes. He was the grandson of Humphrey St John-Mildmay, younger son of Sir Henry Paulet St John-Mildmay, 3rd Baronet (see St John-Mildmay Baronets for earlier history of the family). The title became extinct on the death of his son, the second Baron, on 12 May 1950.

The family seat was Flete House, Devon.

== Barons Mildmay of Flete (1922) ==
- Francis Bingham Mildmay, 1st Baron Mildmay of Flete (1861–1947)
- Anthony Bingham Mildmay, 2nd Baron Mildmay of Flete (1909–1950)

== See also ==
- St John-Mildmay Baronets
