= Sir Henry St John, 2nd Baronet =

British politician

Sir Henry Paulet St John, 2nd Baronet (1737–1784), was a British politician who sat in the House of Commons from 1772 to 1780.

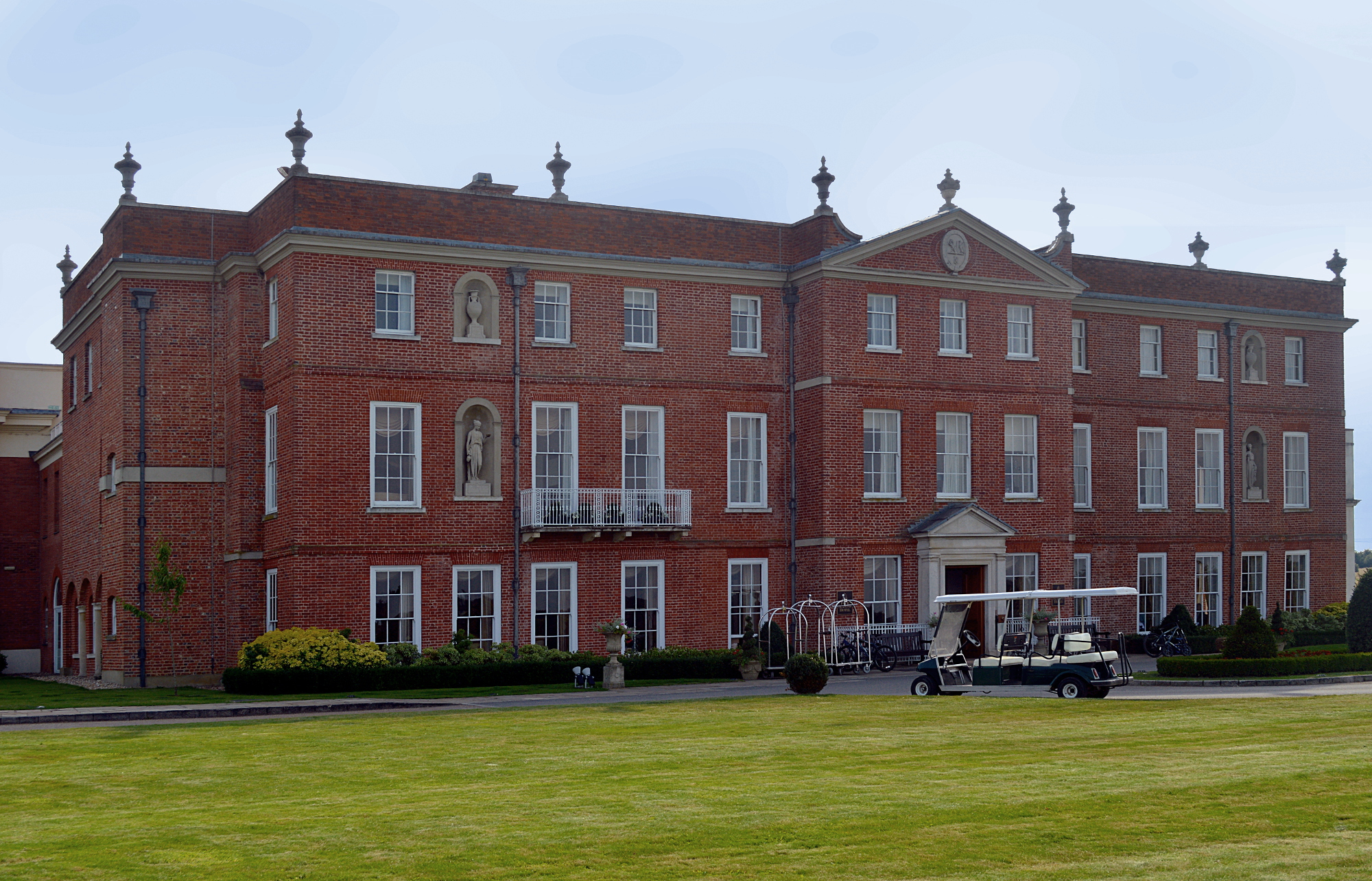
Dogmersfield Park

== Early life ==
St John was the eldest son of Sir Paulet St John, 1st Baronet, MP. of Dogmersfield Park, Hampshire and his wife Mary Waters, daughter of John Waters of Brecon. In 1750 he was at Winchester College. He entered New College, Oxford on 15 October 1755 and was awarded MA on 5 July 1759. At the age of 23, he was knighted on 24 December 1760. He married Dorothy Maria Tucker, daughter of Abraham Tucker of Betchworth Castle Surrey on 27 October 1763.

== Political career ==
With the backing of the Duke of Chandos, St. John was returned unopposed as Member of Parliament for Hampshire at a by-election in February 1772. In the 1774 general election he retained the seat. He is not recorded as speaking in the House and he did not stand in 1780.

== Later life and legacy ==
St John succeeded his father in the baronetcy and the Dogmersfield Park estate on 9 June 1780 and died on 7 August 1784. He was succeeded by his only son Henry. He and his wife Dorothy also had two daughters.

Parliament of Great Britain
Preceded by Lord Henley; Sir Simeon Stuart, Bt	Member of Parliament for Hampshire; 1772–1780 1772-1779; With: Sir Simeon Stuart, Bt 1779-1780; Jervoise Clarke Jervoise	Succeeded by Robert Thistlethwayte; Jervoise Clarke Jervoise
Baronetage of Great Britain
Preceded by Paulet St John	Baronet (of Farley); 1780-1784	Succeeded by Henry Paulet St John-Mildmay
