= Francis Mildmay, 1st Baron Mildmay of Flete =

British politician (1861-1947)

The Right Honourable The Lord Mildmay of Flete TD, DL
- Mildmay in 1895

Member of Parliament for Totnes
- In office 1885–1922
- Preceded by: New constituency
- Succeeded by: Samuel Harvey

Lord Lieutenant of Devon
- In office 1928–1936
- Preceded by: The Earl Fortescue
- Succeeded by: The Earl Fortescue

Personal details
- Born: 26 April 1861
- Died: 8 February 1947 (aged 85)
- Party: Liberal; Liberal Unionist; Conservative
- Spouse: Alice O. St. J. Grenfell (m. 1906)
- Children: 2
- Parents: Henry Bingham Mildmay (father); Georgiana Frances Bulteel (mother)
- Relatives: Anthony Mildmay (son)
- Education: Eton College; Trinity College, Cambridge
- Military career
- Allegiance: United Kingdom
- Branch: British Army
- Service years: 1900-1918
- Units: West Kent Yeomanry (Queen's Own); Imperial Yeomanry
- Conflicts: Second Boer War; World War I; Second Battle of Ypres
- Awards: Territorial Decoration

Francis Bingham Mildmay, 1st Baron Mildmay of Flete, TD, DL (26 April 1861 – 8 February 1947) was initially a Liberal and later a Conservative politician who sat in the House of Commons from 1885 until 1922 when he was raised to the peerage.

Mildmay was the son of Henry Bingham Mildmay and his wife, Georgiana Frances (née Bulteel). He was educated at Eton and Trinity College, Cambridge. He became a partner in the firm of Baring Brothers.

At the 1885 general election, Mildmay was elected Liberal Member of Parliament (MP) for the Totnes division of Devon. He was one of the Liberal Unionists who combined to oppose the Home Rule Bill in 1885, and was returned in subsequent parliaments as a Liberal Unionist, and from 1912 as a Conservative. He held the seat for 37 years until he retired from the Commons at the 1922 general election and was ennobled.

Mildmay held a commission in the West Kent Yeomanry (Queen's Own), a cavalry Yeomanry regiment, where he was first lieutenant, promoted to captain on 17 May 1893, and to major on 20 March 1901. He saw active service in the Second Boer War when he volunteered for the Imperial Yeomanry, where he was appointed a lieutenant in the 11th battalion on 10 February 1900, leaving Liverpool for South Africa on the SS Cymric in March 1900. After the war had ended, he returned to a commission in the West Kent Yeomanry in August 1902. He later served in World War I between 1914 and 1918. At one stage he was divisional interpreter of Lieutenant-General Sir Thomas D'Oyly Snow, who referred to him with affection and some wonderment at his tireless work and bravery in doing his duty at the Second Battle of Ypres. Mildmay was often found to be carrying messages across the battlefield. Snow described him as a colourful and brave chap and recommended him for a decoration more than once though he never got one apart from the Territorial Decoration (TD).

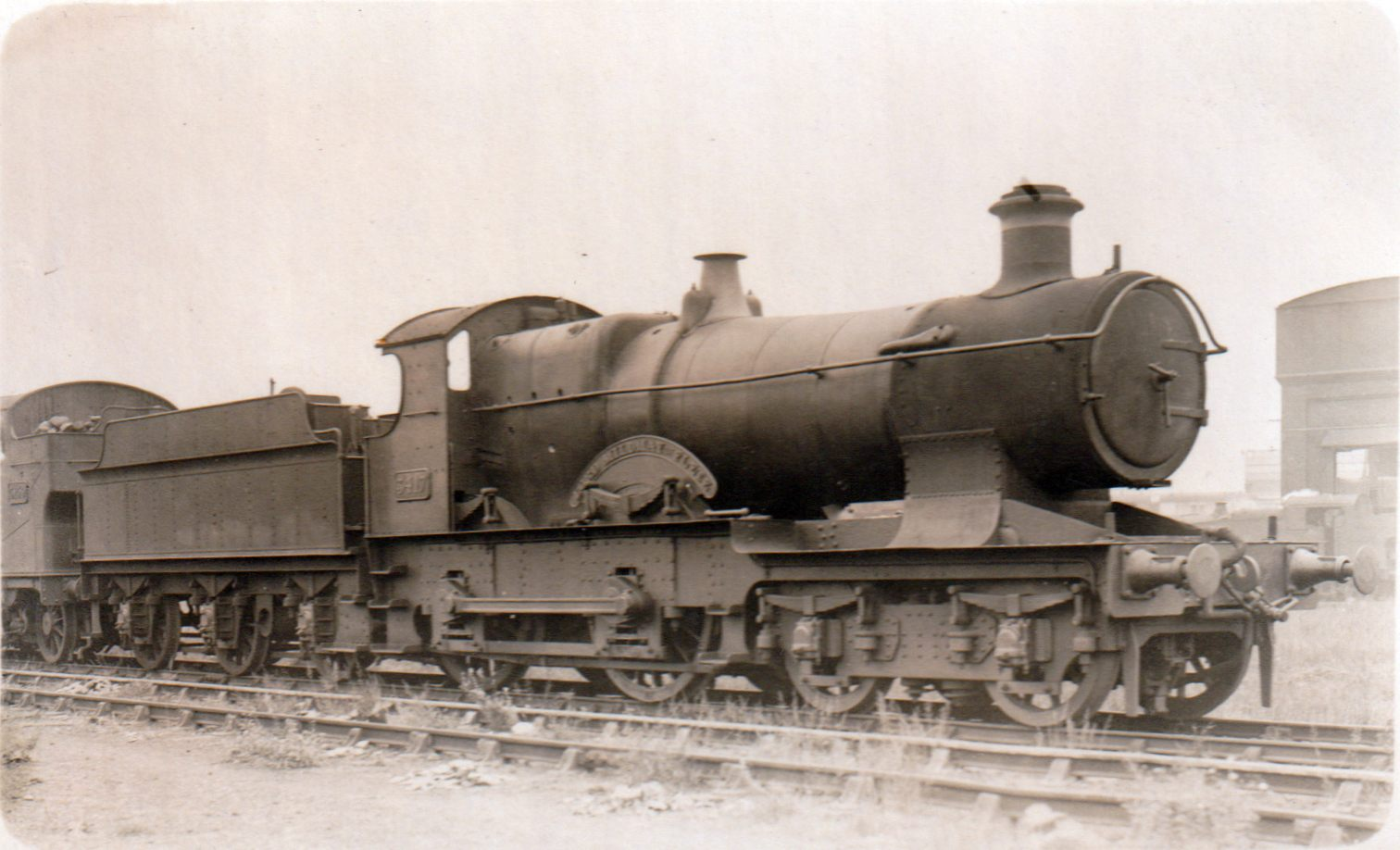
GWR 'Bulldog' class 3417 Lord Mildmay of Flete (named in 1923)

Mildmay was created Baron Mildmay of Flete, of Totnes in the County of Devon, on 20 November 1922 and was a member of the Committee for Review of Political Honours Commission between 1923 and 1924. Appointed a deputy lieutenant of Devon on 31 March 1913, he became Lord-Lieutenant of Devon in 1928. He lived at Flete House, a mansion near Plymouth built by his father which remodelled and extended the original house of the Elizabethan era. He was an extensive breeder and exhibitor of South Devon Cattle and was President of the Royal Agricultural Society of England in 1932 and from 1941 to 1943. He was a member and treasurer of the Medical Research Council and a director of the Great Western Railway, who named 'Bulldog' class locomotive 3417 after him.

== Family ==
Mildmay married Alice O. St. J. Grenfell, daughter of Charles Seymour Grenfell, in 1906. They had two children: a son, Anthony, and a daughter, Helen Mildmay-White.

Parliament of the United Kingdom
New constituency	Member of Parliament for Totnes; 1885–1922	Succeeded by Samuel Harvey
Honorary titles
Preceded by The Earl Fortescue	Lord Lieutenant of Devon; 1928–1936	Succeeded by The Earl Fortescue
Peerage of the United Kingdom
New creation	Baron Mildmay of Flete; 1922–1947	Succeeded by Anthony Bingham Mildmay
