= Sir Thomas Mildmay, 1st Baronet =

English politician (d. 1626)

Escutcheon of the Mildmay baronets of Moulsham

Sir Thomas Mildmay, 1st Baronet (ca. 1573 – 1626) of Moulsham, Essex, was an English politician.

He was the eldest son of Sir Thomas Mildmay of Moulsham and Lady Frances Radclyffe and was educated at Queens' College, Cambridge (1589) and Corpus Christi College, Cambridge (1590).

He was a Member of Parliament (MP) for Maldon 1593, knighted in 1603 and created a baronet in 1611.

He married twice; firstly Elizabeth, the daughter of Sir John Puckering and secondly Ann, the daughter of Sir John Savile. He had no children and the baronetcy died with him.

Baronetage of England
New creation	Baronet (of Moulsham); 1611–1626	Extinct
Preceded by Monins baronets	Mildmay Baronets; 29 June 1611	Succeeded by Maynard baronets
