= Sir Henry St John-Mildmay, 3rd Baronet =

English politician

Sir Henry Paulet St John-Mildmay, 3rd Baronet (30 September 1764 – 11 November 1808), of Dogmersfield Park, Hampshire, was an English politician.

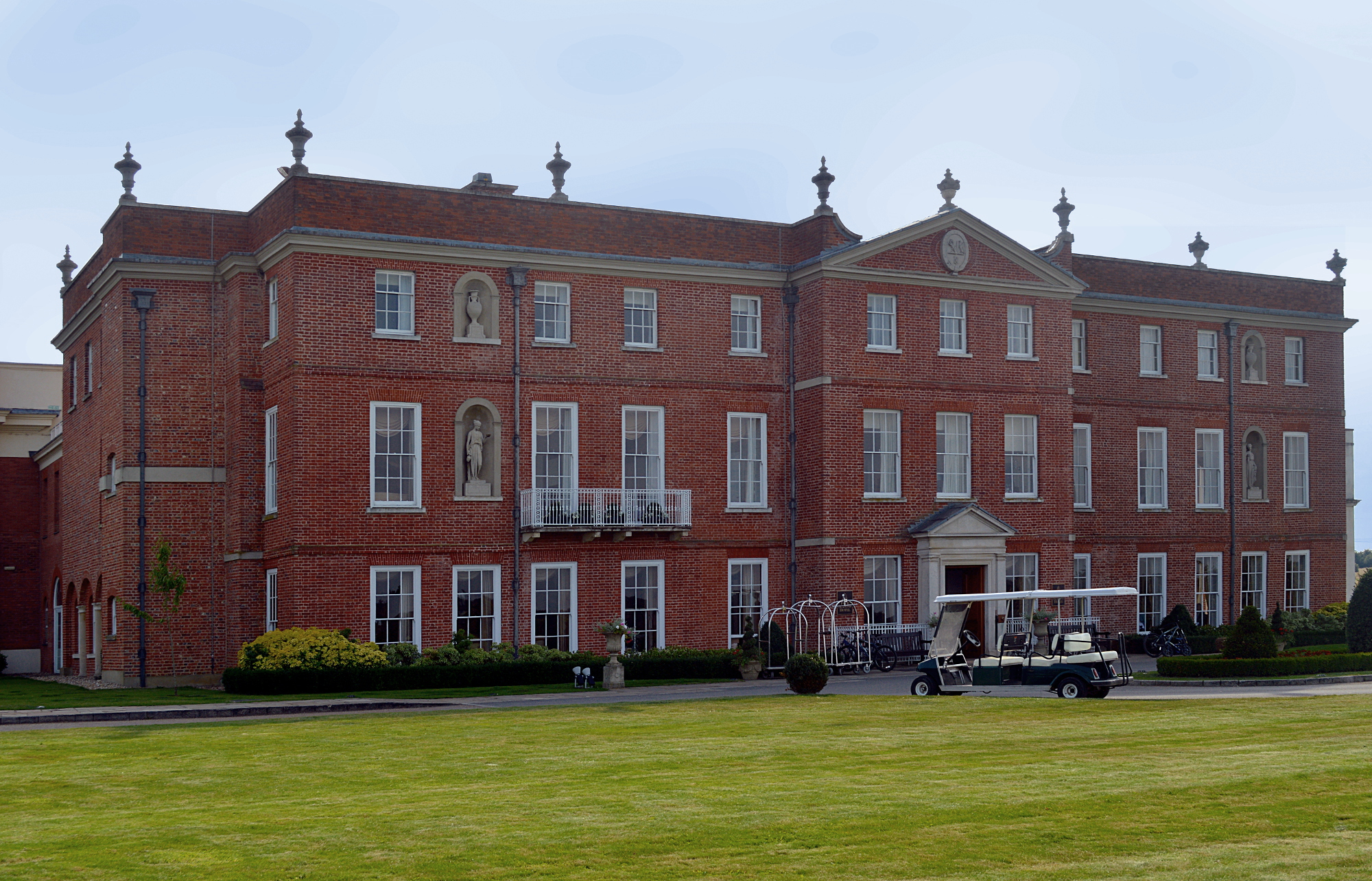
Dogmersfield Park

== Life ==
St John was the only son of Sir Henry Paulet St John, Bt and his wife Dorothea Maria Tucker, daughter of Abraham Tucker of Betchworth Castle, Surrey, and was born on 30 September 1764. He matriculated at St John's College, Cambridge in 1781, graduating M.A. in 1785.

St John succeeded to the baronetcy and Dogmersfield Park on 7 August 1784. He was High Sheriff of Hampshire in 1787 and a member (MP) for Westbury 1796 – 1802, for Winchester 1802–1807 and for Hampshire 1807 – 11 November 1808.

In 1790 St John succeeded his wife's great-uncle Carew Hervey Mildmay to Marks Hall, Essex and Hazelgrove, Somerset and took the additional name of Mildmay. In 1796 he also succeeded his wife's aunt Anne, widow of Sir William Mildmay, 1st Bt., to Moulsham Hall, Essex.

St John-Mildmay died in 1808 and was succeeded by his eldest son Sir Henry St John-Mildmay, 4th Baronet.

== Family ==
St John married, in 1786, Jane, the daughter and coheir of Carew Mildmay of Shawford House, Hampshire and had 11 sons and 3 daughters.

- Sir Henry St. John Carew (15 Apr 1787 – 17 Jan 1848)
- Jane Dorothea (11 Apr 1788 – 15 Mar 1846); Paul Methuen, 1st Baron Methuen. They had four children.
- Judith Anne (2 Apr 1790, d. 27 Apr 1851); married William Pleydell-Bouverie, 3rd Earl of Radnor. They had five children.
- Maria (2 Apr 1790 – 21 Dec 1836); married Henry St John, 4th Viscount Bolingbroke. They had six children.
- Paulet (8 Apr 1791 – 19 May 1845); married Anna Maria Wyndham Bouverie, daughter of the Hon. Bartholomew Bouverie MP. They had four children.
- Capt. George William (20 Apr 1792 – 14 Feb 1851); married Mary Baillie, daughter of Peter Baillie MP for Inverness Burghs. They had a son, and daughter.
- Humphrey (11 Jul 1794 – 9 Aug 1853); married first the Hon. Anne Eugenia Baring, daughter of Alexander Baring, 1st Baron Ashburton. After her death he married Marianne Frances Harcourt-Vernon, daughter of Granville Harcourt-Vernon MP. He had two sons with Anne, and three daughters with Marianne.
- Capt. John Francis (8 Dec 1795 – 1 Sep 1823); unmarried.
- Capt. Edward (7 Jul 1797 – 16 May 1868); married first Marianne Catherine Sherson, and together had four children. They divorced in 1830, and five years later he married Frances Lucy Penelope Percival. They had one daughter.
- Rev. Walter (12 Oct 1798 – 31 Jul 1835); married Kitty Anne Warde. No known issue.
- Ven. Carew Antony (2 Feb 1800 – 13 Jul 1878); married the Hon. Caroline Waldegrave, daughter of Adm. William Waldegrave, 1st Baron Radstock. They had two daughters.
- Letitia (1803 – 18 Aug 1844); unmarried.

Parliament of Great Britain
Preceded by Samuel Estwick; Edward Bootle-Wilbraham	Member of Parliament for Westbury; 1796–1801; With: George Ellis 1796; George William Richard Harcourt 1796–1800; John Simon Harcourt 1800–1801	Succeeded by Parliament of the United Kingdom
Parliament of the United Kingdom
Preceded by Parliament of Great Britain	Member of Parliament for Westbury; 1801–1802; With: John Simon Harcourt	Succeeded by William Baldwin; Charles Smith
Preceded by The Viscount Palmerston; Richard Grace Gamon	Member of Parliament for Winchester; 1802–1807; With: Richard Grace Gamon	Succeeded by Henry St John-Mildmay; Richard Grace Gamon
Preceded by Thomas Thistlethwayte; The Hon. William Herbert	Member of Parliament for Hampshire; 1807–1808; With: William John Chute	Succeeded by Thomas Freeman-Heathcote; William John Chute
Baronetage of Great Britain
Preceded by Henry St John	Baronet (of Farley); 1784–1808	Succeeded by Henry St John-Mildmay
