= Sir Henry St John-Mildmay, 6th Baronet =

English cricketer and baronet

Henry St John-Mildmay
Personal information
- Full name: Henry Paulet St John-Mildmay
- Born: 28 April 1853; Westminster, London, England
- Died: 24 April 1916 (aged 62); Dogmersfield, Hampshire, England
- Batting: Right-handed
- Bowling: Unknown

Domestic team information
- Years: Team
- 1881–1884: Hampshire

Career statistics
Competition	First-class
Matches	7
Runs scored	137
Batting average	11.41
100s/50s	–/–
Top score	26
Balls bowled	104
Wickets	1
Bowling average	51.00
5 wickets in innings	–
10 wickets in match	–
Best bowling	1/26
Catches/stumpings	4/–
- Source: Cricinfo, 19 January 2010

Sir Henry Paulet St John-Mildmay, 6th Baronet JP (28 April 1853 – 24 April 1916) was an English first-class cricketer and British Army officer.

The son of Sir Henry St John-Mildmay, 5th Baronet and his wife, Helena Shaw Lefevre, he was born at Westminster in April 1853. Mildmay was educated at Eton College, before joining the Grenadier Guards as a sub-lieutenant. He was promoted to lieutenant in July 1874. Mildmay, who played services cricket for the Household Brigade, made his debut in first-class cricket for Hampshire against Sussex at Hove in 1881. He made three further three appearances for Hampshire in that season, followed by a further appearance in May 1882. His participation in the 1882 season was likely cut-short by his service in the Anglo-Egyptian War of July—September 1882, in which he gained the Khedive's Star. Returning to England following the conflict, Mildmay made two further first-class appearances for Hampshire, against Sussex in 1883 and Kent in 1884. Described by Wisden as "a good, steady bat and safe field", he scored 137 runs at an average of 11.41, with a highest score of 26.

In the Grenadier Guards, he was promoted to captain in July 1884. In 1885, he saw action in the Mahdist War, partaking in the Nile Expedition to relieve Khartoum and was mentioned in dispatches. Mildmay was promoted to brevet major in August 1885, and later retired from active service in June 1894. Mildmay succeeded his father as the 6th Baronet of the St John-Mildmay baronets upon his death 1902. He later served as a justice of the peace for Hampshire. Mildmay died in April 1916 at Dogmersfield Park in Dogmersfield, Hampshire. Having died without issue, he was succeeded as the 7th Baronet by his younger brother, Sir Gerald St John-Mildmay.

Baronetage of Great Britain
Preceded by Henry St John-Mildmay	Baronet (of Farley); 1902–1916	Succeeded by Gerald St John-Mildmay
