= St John-Mildmay baronets =

Title in the Baronetage of Great Britain

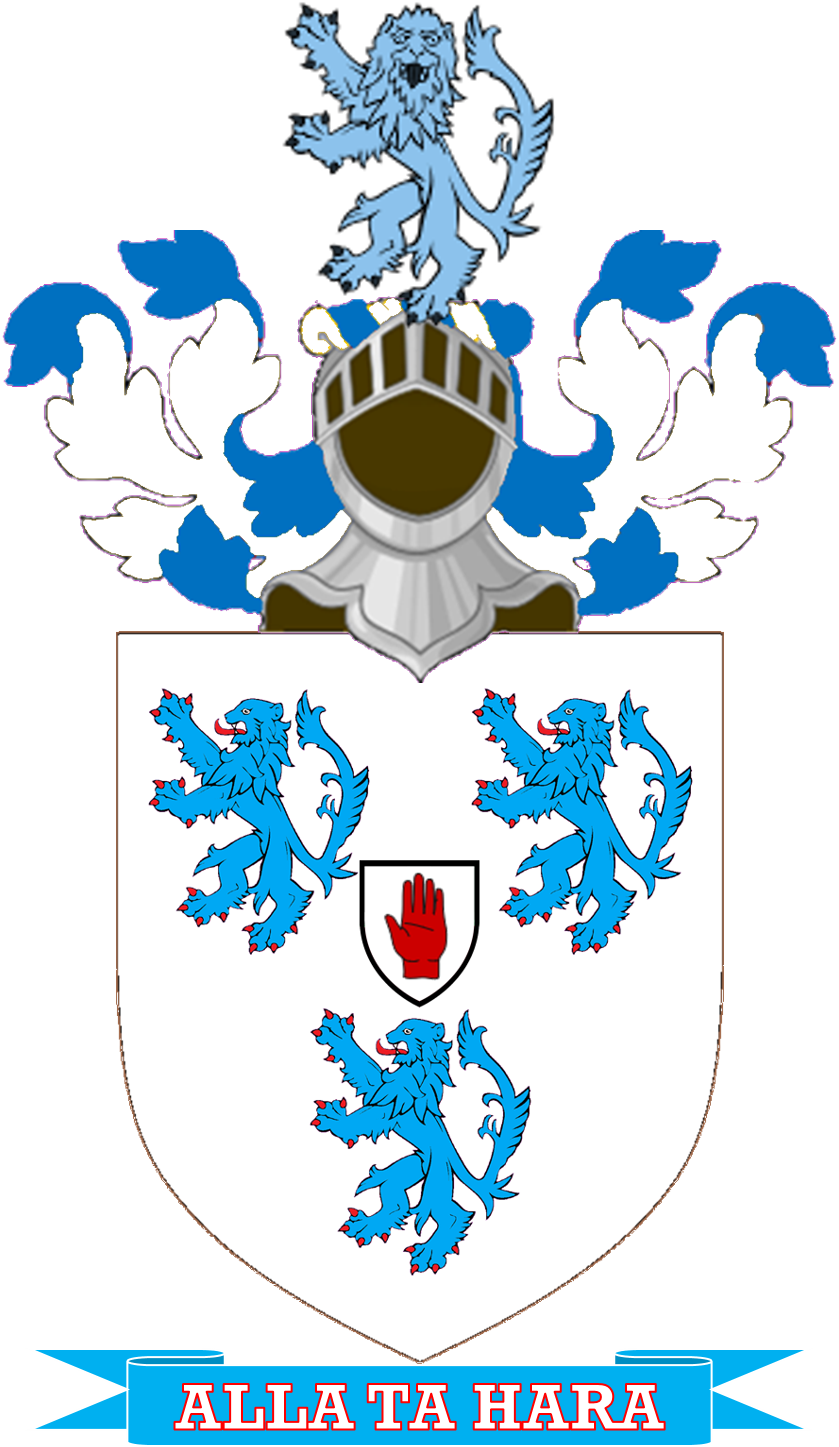
Arms: Argent three lions rampant Azure armed and langued Gules. Crest: lion rampant guardant Azure.

The St John, later St John-Mildmay Baronetcy, of Farley in the County of Southampton, is a title in the Baronetage of Great Britain. It was created on 9 October 1772 for Paulet St John, Member of Parliament for Winchester and Hampshire. The second Baronet represented Hampshire in the House of Commons. The third Baronet was Member of Parliament for Westbury, Winchester and Hampshire. He married Jane, daughter of Carew Mildmay, and assumed the additional surname of Mildmay. The fourth Baronet sat as Member of Parliament for Winchester. The title became dormant in 1955 on the death of the tenth Baronet. In 1998 Walter John Hugh St John-Mildmay successfully proved his right to the title and became the eleventh Baronet.

Several other members of the family have also gained distinction. Hervey George St John-Mildmay (1817–1882), son of Paulet St John-Mildmay (1791–1845), second son of the third Baronet, was a captain in the Royal Navy. George William St John-Mildmay (1792–1851), third son of the third Baronet, was a captain in the Royal Navy. John Francis St John-Mildmay (1795–1823), fourth son of the third Baronet, was a captain in the Royal Navy. Humphrey St John-Mildmay, sixth son of the third Baronet, was Member of Parliament for Southampton. His son Humphrey St John-Mildmay was Member of Parliament for Herefordshire. Francis Mildmay, son of Henry Bingham Mildmay, another son of Humphrey St John-Mildmay, sixth son of the third Baronet, was elevated to the peerage as Baron Mildmay of Flete in 1922 (see this title for further information on this branch of the family). The Venerable Carew Antony St John-Mildmay (1800–1878), seventh son of the third Baronet, was Archdeacon of Essex. Grace Audrey Louisa St John-Mildmay, wife of the founder of the Glyndebourne opera festival John Christie, was the daughter of the tenth baronet, Aubrey Neville St.-John.

== St John, later St John-Mildmay baronets, of Farley (1772) ==
- Sir Paulet St John, 1st Baronet (1704–1780)
- Sir Henry Paulet St John, 2nd Baronet (1737–1784)
- Sir Henry Paulet St John-Mildmay, 3rd Baronet (1764–1808)
- Sir Henry St John Carew St John-Mildmay, 4th Baronet (1787–1848)
- Sir Henry Bouverie Paulet St John-Mildmay, 5th Baronet (1810–1902)
- Sir Henry Paulet St John-Mildmay, 6th Baronet (1853–1916)
- Sir Gerald Anthony Shaw-Lefevre St John-Mildmay, 7th Baronet (1860–1929))
- Sir Anthony St John-Mildmay, 8th Baronet (1894–1947)
- Sir Henry Gerald St John-Mildmay, 9th Baronet (1926–1949)
- Sir Aubrey Neville St John-Mildmay, 10th Baronet (1865–1955) (dormant)
  - Verus Arundell St John-Mildmay, presumed de jure Baronet (1906–1965)
  - Michael Paulet St John-Mildmay, presumed de jure Baronet (1903–1993)
- Sir Walter John Hugh St John-Mildmay, 11th Baronet (1935–2022) (claimed title 1998)
- Sir Michael Hugh Paulet St. John-Mildmay, 12th Baronet (b. 1937)

The heir apparent is the present holder's eldest son Henry Walter St. John-Mildmay (born 1971).

== Notes ==
Baronetage of Great Britain
Preceded by Blake baronets	St John baronets of Farley; 9 October 1772	Succeeded by Wilmot baronets
