= Dogmersfield Park =

Grade I listed country house in Hampshire, United Kingdom

Coordinates: 51.258346°N 0.896029°W

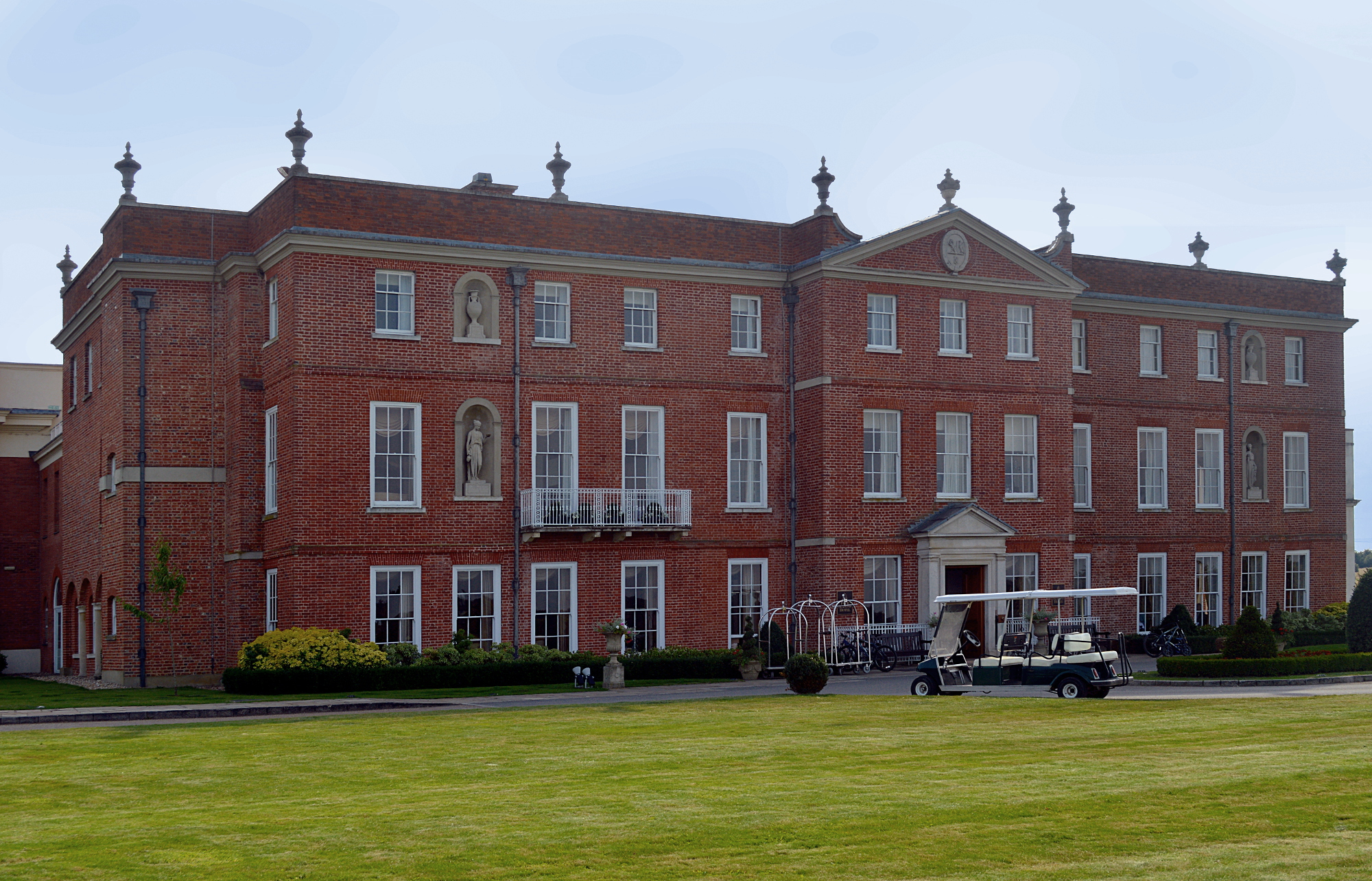
Dogmersfield House

Dogmersfield Park or Dogmersfield House is a Grade I listed Georgian country house, now being used as a hotel. It is located in Dogmersfield, a small village in Hampshire, England. The land was recorded in the Domesday Book of 1086 as "Doccemere feld".

Construction of the present building began in 1728 when a 3-storey rectangular block was built in brick in the Georgian style. Additional wings were added in the late 18th century and in the Victorian era to form a three-sided square enclosing a courtyard. The square was later completed with the addition of a modern chapel.

== History ==
In medieval times the manor of Dogmersfield belonged to the Bishops of Bath and Wells, who built a palace there in the 13th century, probably on the site of the present house. Henry VI was a frequent visitor and Henry VII took his eldest son Prince Arthur there to meet the latter's future wife, Katherine of Aragon, for the first time.

The manor was acquired in 1539 by Henry VIII and in 1547 granted to Thomas, Lord Wriothesley, who built a house and dovecote there. During the 17th century it passed through a number of hands until being possessed by Ellis St John. He started to build the present house in 1748 but died the same year. His son and heir Sir Paulet St John, 1st Baronet completed the task, later extending both the house and the estate. During the ownership of his son Sir Henry St John-Mildmay, 3rd Baronet, the Basingstoke Canal was built through the grounds (1790–92). Following the death of the 6th Baronet, much of the parkland was sold.

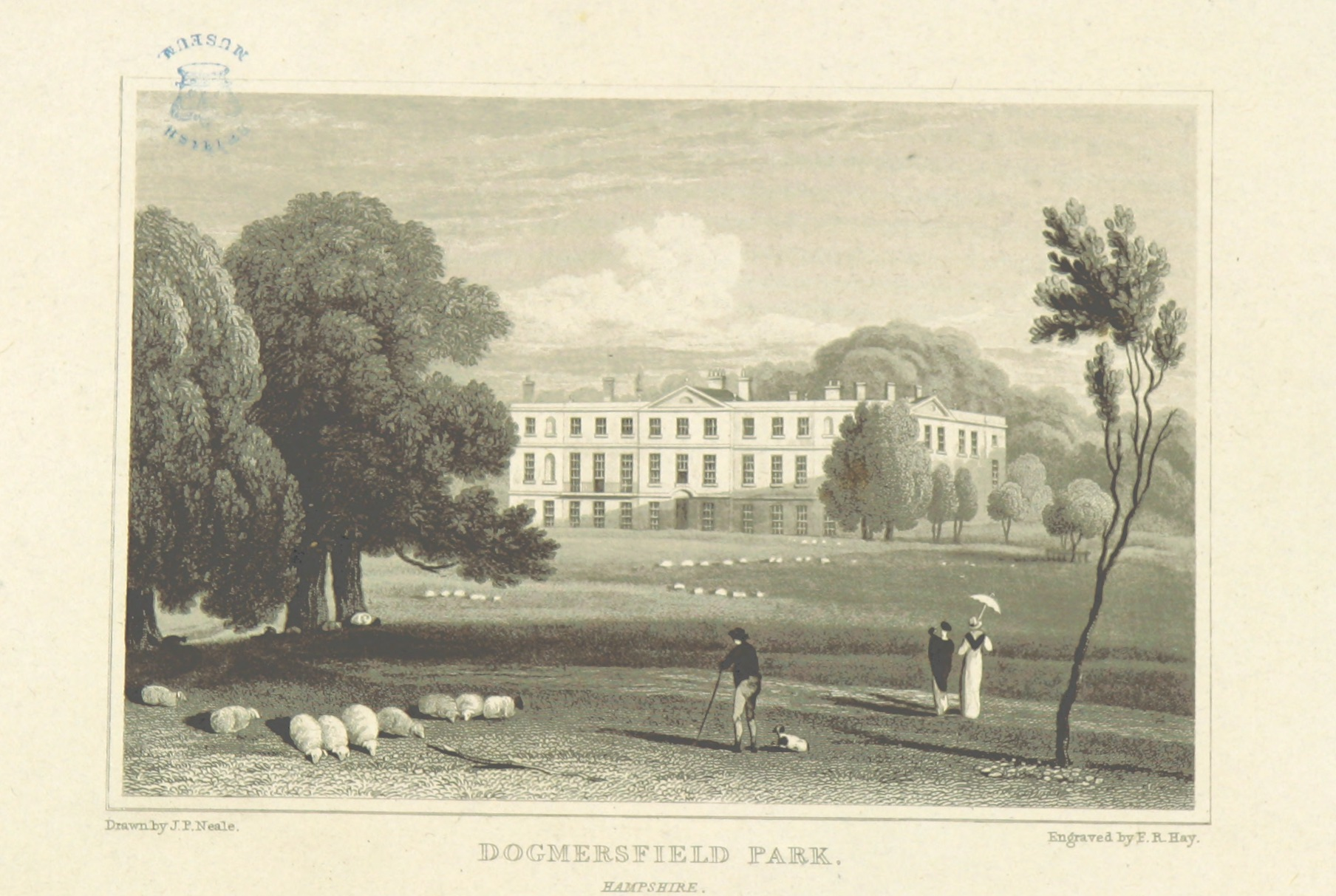
Engraving of Dogmersfield Park, after drawing by Neale (1818)

The 7th Baronet died childless in 1929 and the remaining estate was sold to Claud Ronald Anson and later became the Reeds School (1933), then a college of the De La Salle Brothers (1956) and then the Daneshill School (1973). The building was severely damaged by fire in 1981 and was purchased, renovated and extended for use as office accommodation by the American computer company Amdahl Corporation. They sold the property in 1996 to the software company Systems Union who in turn put it up for sale in 2000.

Since spring 2005, after completion of a major renovation, the manor, on 500 acres, has operated as the Four Seasons Hotel Hampshire.
