= Eden (surname) =

Eden or Éden is a surname. Notable people with the surname include:

- Alp Eden (born 1958), Turkish mathematician
- Anthony Eden (1897–1977), British Prime Minister
- Archibald Eden (1872–1956), British army officer
- Ashley Eden (1831–1887), British colonial administrator and diplomat
- Barbara Eden (born 1931), American actress and singer
- Billy Eden (1905–1993, English footballer
- Bobbi Eden (born 1980), Dutch pornographic actress
- Bradford Lee Eden (born 1960), American librarian and Tolkien scholar
- Brooke Eden (born 1988), American singer
- Cam Eden (born 1998), American baseball player
- Caroline Eden (c.1737–c.1803), First Lady of Maryland
- Chana Eden (1932–2019), Israeli-American actress
- Charles Eden (politician) (1673–1722), British Governor of North Carolina
- Charles Eden (Royal Navy officer) (1808–1878), Royal Navy Admiral
- Charles Page Eden (1807–1885), English Anglican priest and author
- Charlie Eden (1855–1920), American baseball player
- Chris Eden, British chef
- Clarissa Eden (1920–2021), English memoirist, wife of Anthony Eden
- Colin Eden, British management scientist
- Conrad William Eden (1905–1995), English cathedral organist
- Dana Eden (1973–2026), Israeli television producer
- Davidson Eden (born 1988), Ghanaian footballer
- Denis Eden (1878–1949), English artist
- Diana Eden (born 1940), Canadian costume designer
- Dorothy Eden (1912–1982), New Zealand writer
- Drozena Eden (1908–1973), Australian rules footballer
- Edwin Eden (1893–1939), English cricketer
- Elana Eden (born 1940), Israeli actress
- Eleanor Eden (1777–1851), British countess
- Elizabeth Eden (1946–1987), American transgender woman
- Emily Eden (1797–1869), English poet and novelist
- Esther Eden (born 1997), Indian singer-songwriter
- Frederick Eden (cricketer) (1829–1916), English barrister and cricketer
- Frederick Charles Eden (1864–1944), English church architect
- Frederick Morton Eden (1829–1917), English barrister and cricketer
- Sir Frederick Eden, 2nd Baronet (1766–1809), English writer on social conditions, son of Sir Robert Eden, 1st Baronet, of Maryland
- George Morton Eden (1806–1862), British Army general
- George Eden, 1st Earl of Auckland (1784–1849), English politician and colonial administrator
- Greg Eden (born 1990), English rugby league footballer
- Guy Eden (1864–1954), British-Australian lawyer and writer
- Harry Eden (born 1990), British actor
- Harry Eden (rugby league) (1943–2006), Australian rugby league footballer
- Helen Parry Eden (1885–1960), English poet
- Henry Eden (1798–1888), Royal Navy Admiral
- Hibi Eden (born 1983), Indian politician
- Jaap Eden (1873–1925), Dutch speed skater and cyclist
- Jessie Eden (1902–1986), British trade union activist
- Joanna Eden, English jazz singer, songwriter and pianist
- John Eden (athlete) (born 1955), New Zealand paralympic athlete
- John Richard Eden (1859 – after 1917, Canadian financial agent and politician from Ontario
- John R. Eden (1826–1909), American lawyer and politician from Illinois
- Sir John Eden, 2nd Baronet (1677–1728), British Member of Parliament
- Sir John Eden, 4th Baronet (1740–1812), British politician
- John Eden, Baron Eden of Winton (1925–2020), British politician
- Jules Eden (born 1962), British doctor and author
- Karise Eden (born 1992), Australian singer and songwriter
- Kathy Eden, American literary scholar
- Klein Eden (born 1996), Trinidadian footballer
- Lacey Eden (born 2002), American ice hockey player
- Lorna Eden, Fijian politician
- Lorraine Eden, Canadian-American business manager
- Malcolm Eden (born 1963), British musician
- Marc Eden (born 1969), English musician
- Mark Eden (1928–2021), English actor
- Michael Eden ((born 1960), Australian rugby league footballer
- Michal Eden (born 1970), Israeli attorney and politician
- Mike Eden (baseball) (born 1949), Panamanian baseball player
- Michael Eden, 7th Baron Henley (1914–1977), British peer
- Morton Eden, 1st Baron Henley (1752–1830), British diplomat
- Murray Eden (1920–2020), American physical chemist and academic
- Nicholas Eden, 2nd Earl of Avon (1930–1985), British Army officer and politician, son of Anthony Eden
- Oliver Eden, 8th Baron Henley (born 1953), British politician
- Peter Eden (born 1943), British record producer and executive
- Phil Eden (born 1963), English rugby league footballer
- Philip Eden (1951–2018), British weather journalist
- Ray Eden (1968–2011), British cyclist
- Richard Eden (actor) (born 1956), Canadian actor
- Richard Eden (translator) (c.1520–1576), English alchemist and translator
- Richard J. Eden (1922–2021), British theoretical physicist
- Rob Eden (1892–1947), Pseudonym of American writer Robert Ferdiand Burkhardt working as duo with his wife Eve
- Robert Eden (bishop) (1804–1886), British Anglican bishop, son of Sir Frederick Eden, 2nd Baronet
- Robert Eden (priest) (1701–1759), English Anglican priest
- Sir Robert Eden, 1st Baronet, of Maryland (1741–1784), British colonial administrator
- Sir Robert Eden, 1st Baronet, of West Auckland (c.1644–1720), English lawyer and politician
- Robert Eden, 3rd Baron Auckland (1799–1870), British Anglican bishop
- Rodney Eden (1853–1940), English Anglican suffragan bishop
- Rolf Eden (1930–2022), German actor
- Sally Eden (1967–2016), British geographer
- Terence Eden, British technologist and blogger
- Thomas Eden (civil servant) (1787–1844), British colonial adminstrator
- Thomas Eden (cricketer) (1855–1914), New Zealand farmer and cricketer
- Thomas Eden (politician) (died 1645), English jurist, academic and politician
- Tiff Eden (born 1994), English rugby union footballer
- Vilmos Éden (1914–1984), Hungarian rower
- Wiebke Eden, German writer
- William Eden (MP) (1782–1810), British soldier and politician
- William Hassell Eden (1800–1882), British Army general
- William Rushbrooke Eden (1873–1920), British Army officer
- Sir William Eden, 7th Baronet (1849–1915), English sportsman and artist, father of Anthony Eden
- William Eden, 1st Baron Auckland (1745–1814), British diplomat and politician

== See also ==
- Eden baronets, two English baronetcies
- Edén (surname)
- Edens
- Eeden
