= Frederick Eden (disambiguation) =

Sir Frederick Eden, 2nd Baronet was an English writer.

Frederick Eden may also refer to:

- Sir Frederick Eden, 3rd Baronet (died 1814), of the Eden baronets
- Frederick Charles Eden (1864–1944), English church architect and designer
- Frederick Eden (cricketer) (1829–1916), English cricketer and barrister
- Frederick Morton Eden (cricketer) (1829–1917), English cricketer and barrister
