= William Eden =

William Eden may refer to:

- William Eden, 1st Baron Auckland (1744–1814)
- William Eden (MP) (1782–1810), MP for Woodstock, son of the above
- Sir William Eden, 7th Baronet (1849–1915), British aristocrat and politician
- William George Eden, 4th Baron Auckland (1829–1890), Baron Auckland
- William Moreton Eden, 5th Baron Auckland (1859–1917), Baron Auckland

== See also ==
- Eden (surname)
