= Edén =

Edén may refer to:

- Edén (film), a 2022 Spanish psychological drama film
- Edén Muñoz, Mexican singer, songwriter and producer
- Edén Pastora, Nicaraguan politician and guerrilla
- Edén (surname)

== See also ==
- Eden (disambiguation)
