= Helen Parry Eden =

English poet (1885–1960)

Helen Parry Eden (1885 – 19 December 1960) was an English poet. She is credited with making popular in English the phrase "bread and circuses".

== Life ==
She was born Helen Parry, the daughter of Edward Abbott Parry. She was educated at Roedean School, Manchester University, and King's College Art School, where she studied 1903–5 under Byam Shaw and Vicat Cole.

In 1907 she married the artist Denis Eden, and they became Catholic converts in 1909. They had a son and two daughters.

== Works ==
Helen Parry Eden published:

- Bread and Circuses (1914)
- Coal and Candlelight (1918)
- The Rhyme of the Servants of Mary (1919)
- A String of Sapphires (1921)
- Whistles of Silver (1933)
- Poems and Verses (1943).
