= Archibald Eden =

British army officer (1872–1956)

Brigadier-General Archibald Eden CMG DSO
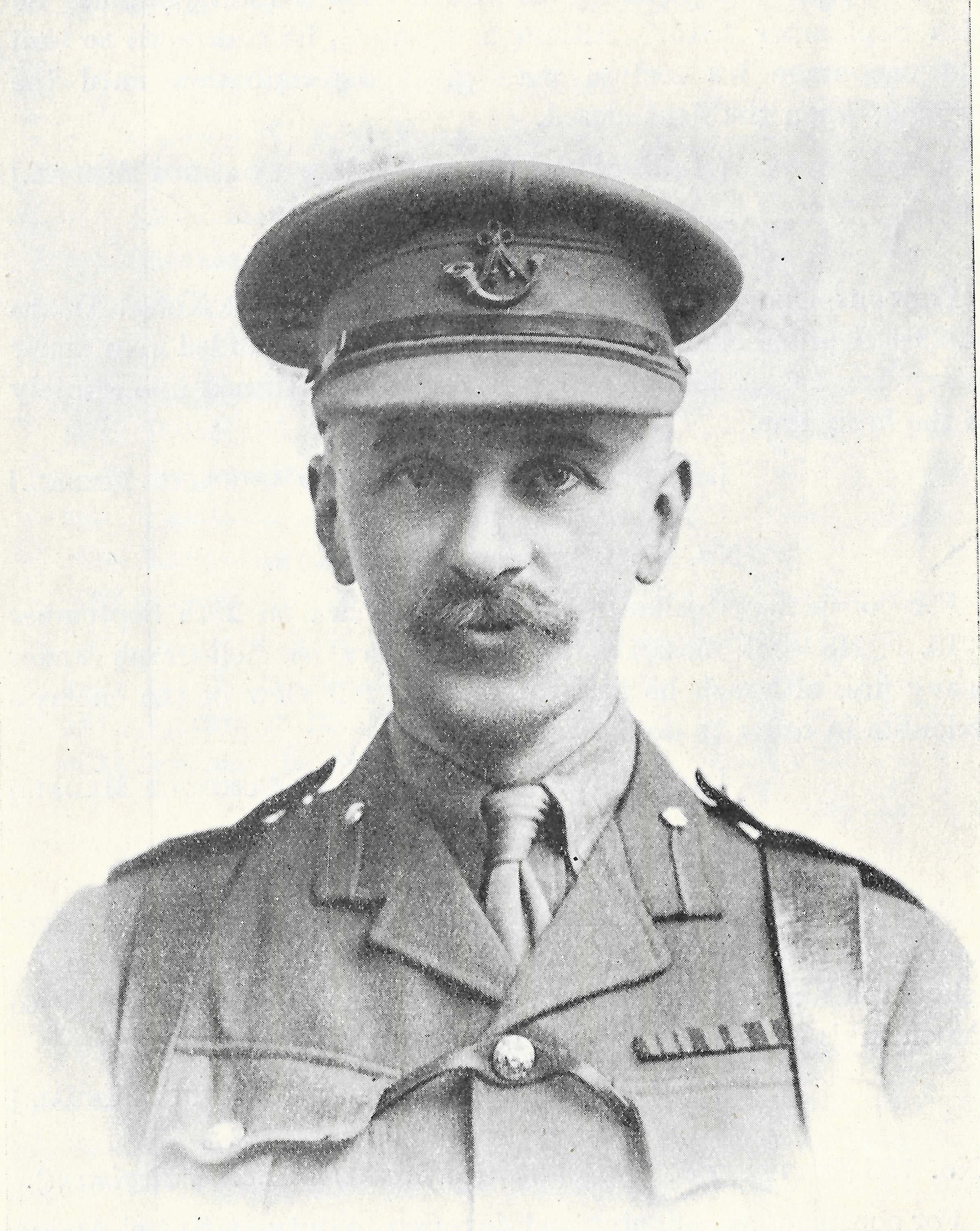
- Born: 20 January 1872; Faizabad, Bengal, India
- Died: 8 May 1956 (aged 84); Winchester, Hampshire
- Spouse: Isabella Ann Weir
- Children: 2
- Relatives: General William Hassell Eden (grandfather); Brigadier General William Rushbrooke Eden (brother)
- Military career
- Allegiance: United Kingdom
- Branch: British Army
- Service years: 1892–1924
- Rank: Brigadier-General
- Unit: Oxfordshire and Buckinghamshire Light Infantry
- Conflicts: War of the Golden Stool; Second Boer War; First World War; First Battle of Ypres; Battle of Loos; Battle of the Somme; Third Battle of the Aisne; Battle of the Sambre
- Awards: Companion of the Order of St Michael and St George; Distinguished Service Order; Mentioned in Despatches; Croix de Guerre (France)

Brigadier-General Archibald James Fergusson Eden, CMG, DSO (20 January 1872 − 8 May 1956) was a career officer in the British Army. He received his commission in 1892 and actively served until 23 March 1924, after which he remained a figure in military circles, organising memorials, overseeing parades and attending military dinners. He was also a direct descendant of Sir Robert Eden, 1st Baronet, of Maryland.

== Early life ==
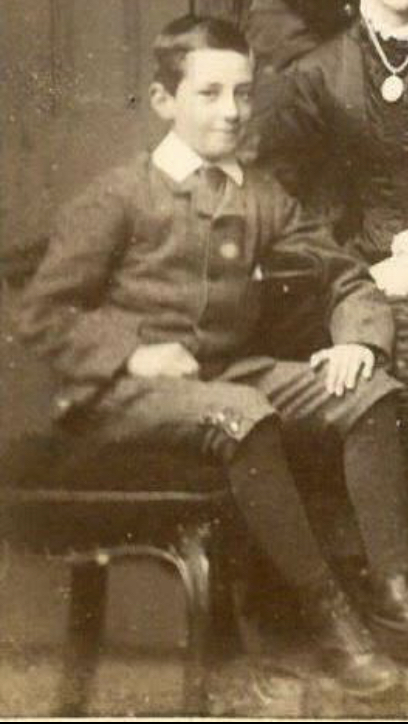
Archibald at age 10, 1882

Archibald Eden was born in Faizabad, British India, on 20 January 1872, the son of Major Archibald Duffield Eden and his wife Emma Louisa Jarvis. He was the oldest of three brothers, his two younger siblings being Cecil Harold Eden and Brigadier General William Rushbrooke Eden. His grandfather was General William Hassell Eden of the 90th Regiment of Foot. He was educated at Haileybury College from May 1885 to December 1889.

In 1903 Eden married Isabella Ann Weir, the daughter of the Rector of Tydavnet in County Antrim, Ireland, with his brother William serving as his best man. Eden and Isabella had two daughters, Louisa Marjorie on 12 September 1906 and Dorothy Isabella in 1909. Louisa died on 8 January 1907.

== Military career ==
Eden was commissioned from the Royal Military College, Sandhurst, on 18 June 1892 as a second lieutenant in the Oxfordshire Light Infantry (the regiment became the Oxfordshire and Buckinghamshire Light Infantry on 16 October 1908). He completed a musketry course at Hythe in 1894.

Eden was granted the temporary rank of captain for service in West Africa on 5 February 1898, and the 12 February 1898 edition of The Colonies and India newspaper lists Eden as bound from Liverpool for Forçados, Nigeria, on board the British and African Steam Navigation Company (Elder Dempster and Company) Steamship Batanga, with the end destination being Ibadan via Lagos. He was then serving in the hinterland of Lagos in Nigeria instructing a new regiment made up of Yoruba locals, entitling him to the East and West Africa Medal with 1897–1898 clasp.

=== War of the Golden Stool ===
On 23 September 1899 Eden is listed as being aboard the British and African Steam Navigation Company Royal Mail ship SS Bornu, embarking from Liverpool with the destination once again being Forçados. This time he was accompanied by a number of the officers who would go on to take part in the War of the Golden Stool. Then-Colonel Sir James Willcocks himself was among them, and he alludes to the journey in his own writings.

During the War of the Golden Stool, whilst serving with the 2nd Battalion of the West African Frontier Force, Eden (promoted to full captain on 24 February 1900 after a superior was taken prisoner of war) was mentioned twice in the London Gazette by Willcocks as part of his 14 August 1900 despatch and his conduct summed up as follows:

This officer has shown great aptitude for commanding native soldiers; under his able guidance the Yoruba has proved himself quite equal to the Hausa; he led the charge at Kumasi. I sincerely trust he will be rewarded.

Sir Francis Fuller‘s book A Vanished Dynasty: Ashanti references that Eden was left in command of the fort at Kumasi on the 17 July with two officers, a doctor, two British NCO’s and 175 men (Willcocks give an alternate number of 160 men with the five British officers and NCO's). This is corroborated by Captain C. H. Armitage DSO and Lieutenant Colonel A. F. Montanaro R.A. in their collaborative work The Ashanti Campaign of 1900. Eden is otherwise mentioned by name multiple times in the work, with one instance being a recollection that Eden and his men successfully took the village of Trede by means of a bayonet charge. His leading of his men in a flanking charge on a stockade is also mentioned, with various other actions being touched upon. The final mention of Eden in the book covers that it was his responsibility to march with his men to Inkawe, returning "reporting that there was no foundation for the news respecting the movement of the rebel leaders into the south". By this stage Eden has been consistently referred to as local Major, although his official rank remained Captain. In The Relief of Kumasi by Captain Harold C. J. Biss he mentions of the charge on Kumasi that "Captain Eden's company had been allotted the privilege of leading, on the ground that he had volunteered to remain in the fort after it had been relieved.". Willcocks also corroborates Eden's volunteering to remain at Kumasi in his book The Romance of Soldiering and Sport, as well as recounting that: "About two miles out from Kumassi the sound of guns from the fort could be heard, and we afterwards learnt that Eden had placed the garrison under cover, and thus drawn out the enemy to explore the precincts. When a good number had come out into the open, 7-pounders and Maxims were turned on them with excellent effect." Willcocks later said in The Great Drama Of Kumasi that: "In my opinion the garrison left behind at Kumasi was altogether unequal to the task of holding fort, and nothing less than fear of Ashantis to attack could have saved them notwithstanding strong fort", implying that if not for Eden's ruse in setting up an ordnance ambush to scare the Ashanti the garrison could have suffered severely.

His involvement in this campaign made him eligible for the Ashanti medal with Kumassi clasp, and he is mentioned as being one of the officers involved in Letters from a Bush Campaign by David Martineau Haylings, the war correspondent for Black & White.

=== Second Boer War ===
Eden was involved in the Second Boer War, having been sent there to join his regiment following his campaign in Ashanti. He was promoted to brevet major on 15 January 1901, and from December 1901 to May 1902 was taking part in operations in Orange River Colony.

In March 1902 The Daily News reports that he was discharged from hospital, indicating that he had either been wounded or fallen sick.

On 13 September 1902 Eden embarked from South Africa for Southampton along with the rest of the 1st Battalion of the Oxfordshire Light Infantry aboard the Winifredian, due back in Southampton on 5 October.

Following the war he was eligible for the Queen's South Africa Medal with five clasps; Cape Colony, Orange Free State, Transvaal, South Africa 1901 and South Africa 1902.

=== Early 1900s ===
On the 1 April 1902 Eden's rank of captain was instituted within his regiment.

During the period between the Second Boer War and the First World War Eden became the last adjutant of the 3rd (Militia) Battalion of The Oxfordshire Light Infantry, finishing this service on 31 March 1908. He was also posted in India for a period of time during this decade, serving as the Station Staff Officer and Assistant Cantonment Magistrate of the garrison at Subathu from October 1904. The Soldiers of Oxfordshire Museum holds a photograph of him and his company dated December 1906 taken in Lucknow with Eden named as a Major in this photograph due to his Brevet Major status, but he was fully promoted to Major on 18 September 1911. In October 1911 following his promotion to full Major he was transferred to the 2nd Battalion in Aldershot.

In 1909 he was a founding member of the Oxford and Buckinghamshire Light Infantry Regimental Association, being named as the Honorary Secretary (pro tem).

=== First World War ===
In 1914 Eden was part of the British Expeditionary Force along with the 2nd Battalion of the Oxford and Buckinghamshire Light Infantry as part of C Company and on 20 October 1914 is listed as the senior officer present, heading up the four companies. The diary for the period covering the First Battle of Ypres records an attack towards Poelcappelle on the 21 October 1914 as having resulted in Eden being wounded. The Story of the Oxfordshire and Buckinghamshire Light Infantry by Sir Henry Newbolt goes into more detail, explaining that the battalion was attempting to storm a gated gap in a hedge covered by machine guns and barbed wire that stood between them and the German defences, with Eden being one of ten officer casualties and circa 200 enlisted men casualties from this action. He was taken away by ambulance, returning on the 5 January 1915. On the 1 April 1915 he is listed as being part of the battalion headquarters and once again the commanding officer and was mentioned by Field Marshal French in his 31 May 1915 despatch, which was followed by his promotion to Brevet Lieutenant-Colonel on 3 June 1915, with this being recorded in the battalion diary on the 25 June 1915.

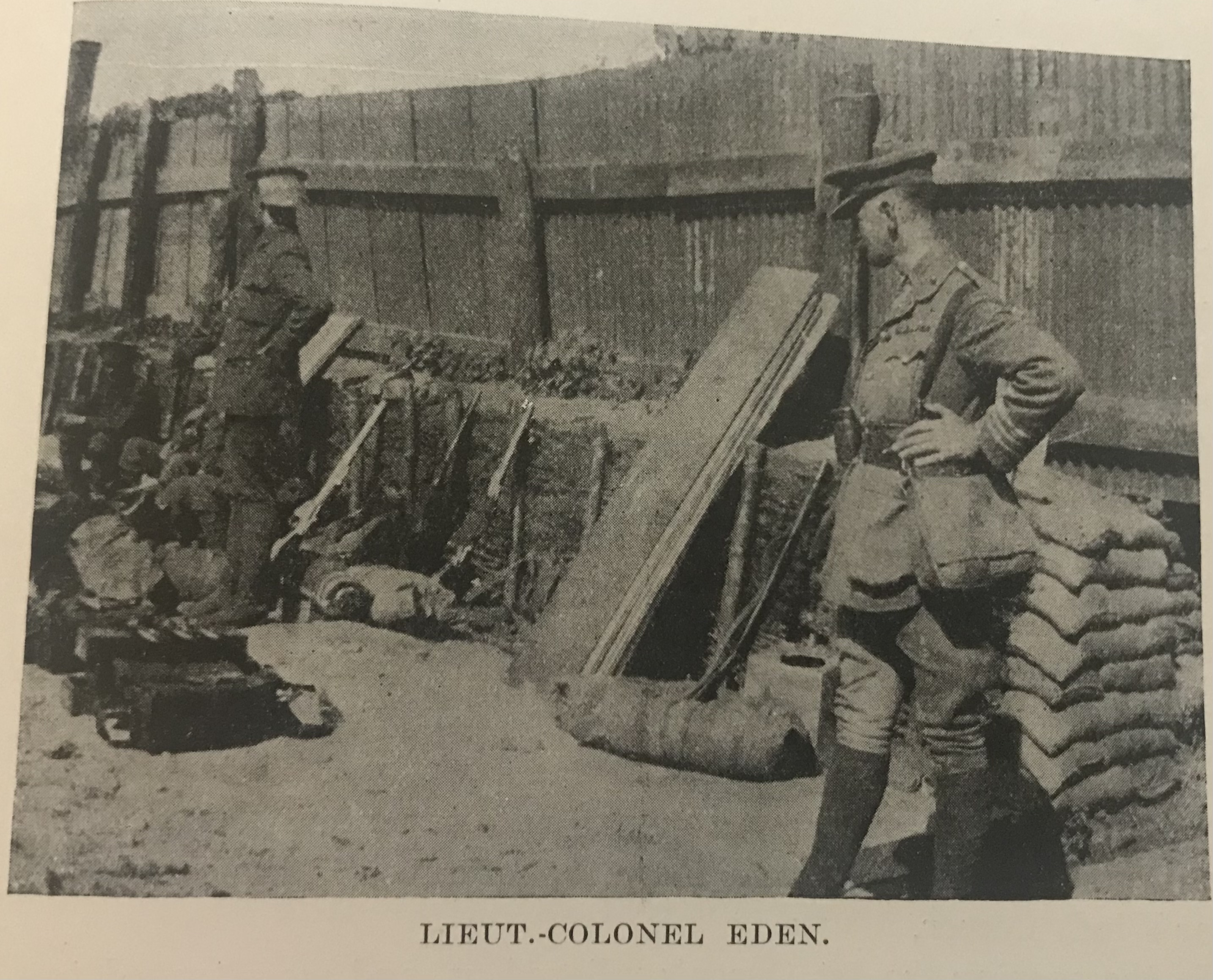
Eden in France

In April 1915 the following letter was published in The Bucks Herald:

To the Editor of The Bucks Herald.

Dear Sir, – Since the commencement of the war, now more than eight months ago, through the medium of your columns, very many kind friends have contributed to our "Regimental Comforts Fund." This has been most efficiently administered by Mrs. Davies, wife of our late Commanding Officer (now promoted Brigadier-General to command an Infantry Brigade). Through this fund the men have received innumerable presents of clothing (of all sorts) – sausages, milk, butter, sweets, chocolate, soap, stationary, cigarettes, tobacco, etc. – in fact, everything which could be reasonably purchased to provide the little extras which help so much to make their lot happier and time pass more quickly than it would ordinarily.

I cannot say how much all these comforts have been appreciated, or how grateful all ranks are for the kind thoughts which have prompted so many subscriptions. The end of the war cannot yet be foreseen, so I venture, with some diffidence, to ask for a continuance of the very kind support your readers have already given to the Fund.

Mrs. Davies has most kindly consented to continue the administration of it, and I feel sure the money will be, therefore, as usefully and economically expended in the future as heretofore.

Again assuring you of our very grateful thanks for all your labours for the Regiment in past years,

I remain, yours faithfully,

A. J. F. Eden, Major

Commanding 52nd Oxford & Bucks L.I.

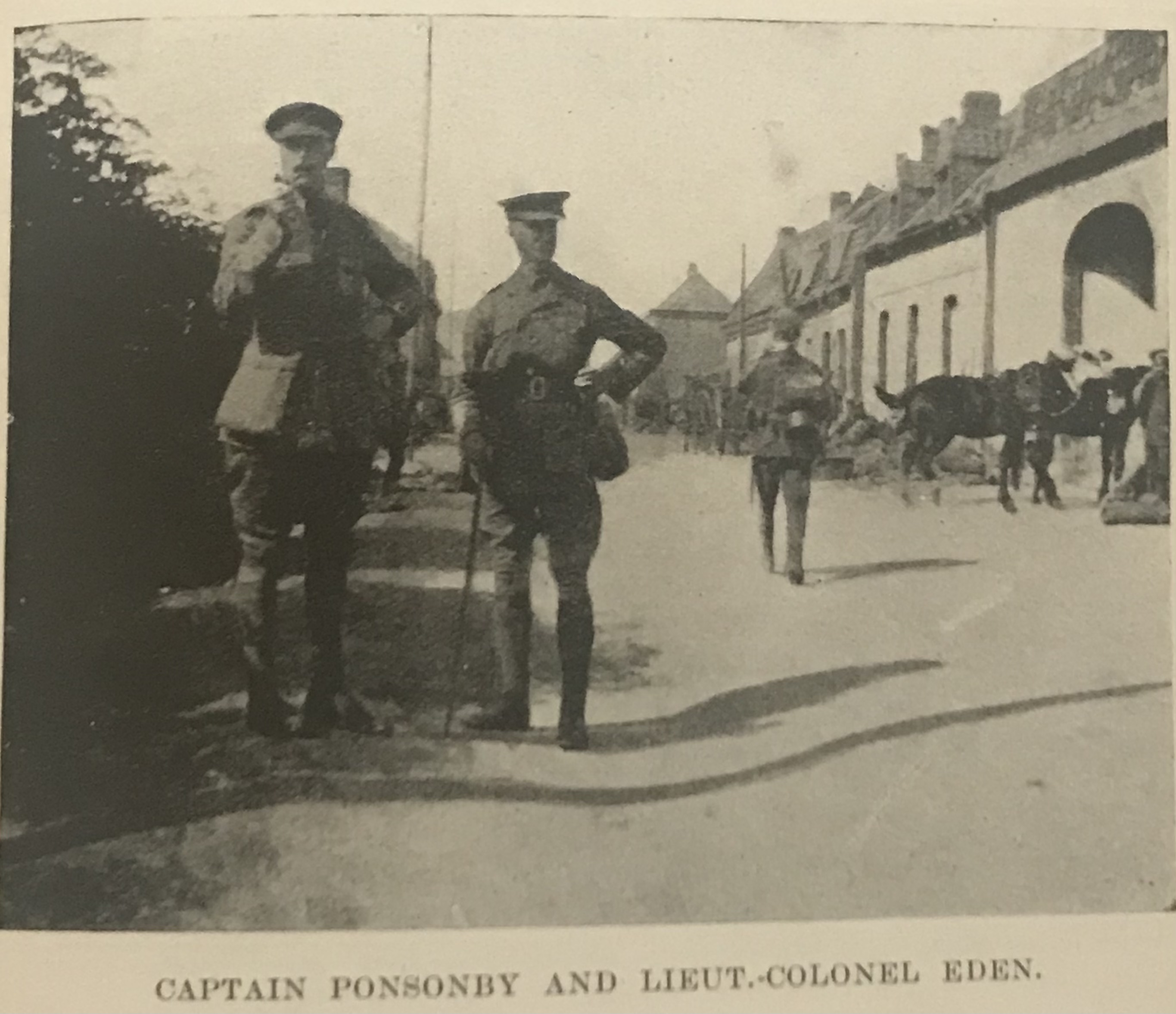
Eden with fellow officer Captain Ponsonby, KIA 09/09/1915, shot through the head and died across Eden’s knees

On 4 September 1915 Eden’s personal diary contained the following entry regarding the preparations for the Battle of Loos:

Very large fatigue parties found by the Regiment to-night – 3 or 4 platoons at a time – in the trenches and at the bomb store. We are going to use gas, though the word must not be breathed. The whole thing is an absolute secret. The cylinders were brought up by rail to within a mile of the village, whence they were transferred in transport wagons to a rendezvous about two miles from the front trenches. Then each cylinder (commonly called a “rat”) was carried on men’s shoulders, with other men in relief; the carrying parties conveying their awkward loads not only noiselessly but with the greatest care.

On 25 October 1915 he was hospitalised once again, returning to command on the 8–10 November 1915. He was mentioned again by Field Marshal French in his 30 November 1915 despatch and as of 15 December 1915 his battalion was part of the 5th Infantry Brigade with Eden in command of the battalion under Brigadier-General Corkran. His rank was increased to full Lieutenant-Colonel on 9 February 1916, backdated to the 18 September 1915.

In early 1916 Eden received a letter from then-Lieutenant-General Horne praising his battalion and regiment. An excerpt published in The Oxford Chronicle read as follows:

I wish I had the opportunity of seeing you to thank all ranks of the 52nd for all that they have done for me. It has been a great honour to be associated with a battalion with such grand traditions, and I cannot say more than that I am confident that you have all not only maintained, but added, to those traditions. I am very grateful for the good work done, gallant fighting, and loyal support of the 52nd, and I wish you farewell and all good fortune. I hope we may be associated again before long.

He was awarded the Distinguished Service Order on 3 June 1916 and was mentioned in despatches by General Haig on 13 June 1916.

On the 23 June 1916 the battalion diary reads: "In compliance with orders received Lt-Col A.J.F. Eden DSO proceeded on special duty to hdqts 4th Army", the Fourth Army being a field army formed to carry out the Battle of the Somme. He was wounded again at the Somme in October 1916.

On 11 July 1916 Eden became the General Officer Commanding of the 24th Infantry Brigade, but was stripped of his position along with multiple other officers following a full restructuring of command circa late December 1916. This does not seem to have stained his record as he is still referenced as being a Brigadier General in the battalion diary of the 2nd Oxford and Bucks dated 18 November 1917, noting a visit he made to his regiment. He appears to have been in command of the 52nd Brigade circa April 1918, but was knocked from his horse on 5 April 1918, wounding his leg. He was evacuated to hospital on 11 April 1918 and succeeded by Brigadier General Walter Allason. On 24 May Eden was recovered and, promoted again to temporary brigadier general, was placed in command of the 57th Infantry Brigade, taking over from Major General Thomas Cubitt. This placed him as part of the 19th (Western) Division, under Major General G.D. Jeffreys, during the Third Battle of the Aisne.

On 10 August 1918 Eden's HQ was hit by a bomb, wounding him with shell splinters to the head, but he made a swift recovery as shown by his return to the command of 57th Brigade on 30 August 1918, with his brigade in reserve at the Battle of the Sambre. The battalion diary of the 2nd Oxford and Bucks dated 14 November 1918, again noting a visit he made to his regiment, references his CMG award.

His medal card confirms his eligibility for the 1914 star with clasp, as he had been serving within at least artillery range of the German lines. He was promoted to full colonel on 3 June 1919 and on 18 September 1919 he was put onto the half-pay list. He was also awarded the French Croix de Guerre.

The later army lists confirm that he retained the rank of Honorary Brigadier General.

=== Inter-war period and Second World War ===
Following the war Eden was placed in command of the 48th (South Midland) Division, taking his official retirement as an honorary brigadier general on 23 March 1924.

During the Second World War Eden organised a local Home Guard branch, commanding it until it was brought to his attention that due to his advanced age it was not legal for him to hold the command. Following this Eden immediately stepped down from his position and enlisted into the same Home Guard branch as a Private, from there working in the branch depot. For this service he was entitled to the Defence Medal.

== Later life ==
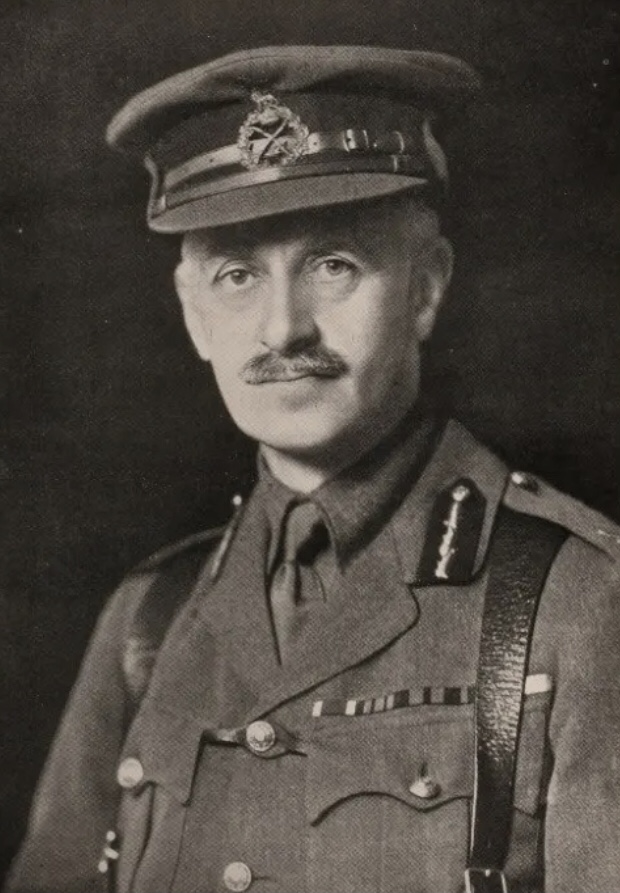
Eden in full Brigadier General uniform

Post-active service Eden remained a figure in military activities, local politics and local historical preservation. He wrote the ‘1925 Regimental Chronicle Militia and Volunteer Battalions Of The Regiment’ for the 4th Battalion of the Oxford and Bucks, signing off: "I am indebted to A History of the Oxfordsbire Regiment of Militia, by Lieut-Colonel Frank Willan, for much of the information in this article; also to Captain Philip Godsal, who has supplied me with the details of the Regiment s history since 1900." and he was a Chum of The Old Contemptibles' Association (being the President of the Winchester Branch), unveiled the Caversham War Memorial in Christchurch Meadows on 5 May 1928, and was also Chairman of the Regimental Committee in 1931 responsible for the organisation of the memorials in the Oxford and Bucks Regimental Chapel in Christ Church Cathedral, Oxford. He was personally responsible for initially compiling the names, and was in attendance at the Service of Dedication and Ceremony in Christ Church on 11 November 1931.

He remained a long-serving county vice-president of the Hampshire Branch of the British Legion.

In 1939 he was involved in a Shawford and Compton subscription and adoption scheme in support of child refugees.

In 1940 Eden was elected vice-chairman of the Winchester branch of the Conservative Party, as well as Hon. Treasurer. Circa 1945 he was the Treasurer of the branch, and circa 1953 he was a member of the Hampshire Field Club and Archaeological Society.

He died on 8 May 1956, aged 84.

== Legacy ==
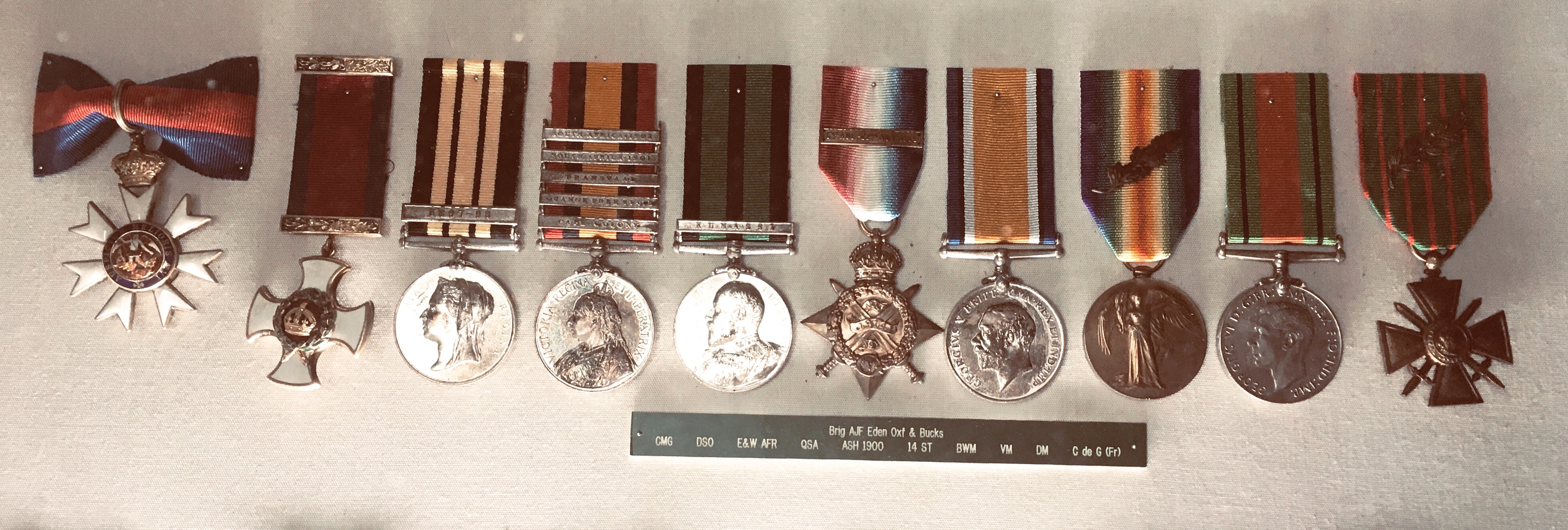
Medals of AJF Eden

The National Army Museum holds two photograph albums compiled by Eden, one labelled as referring to "Nigeria and Ashanti, 1899–1901", and the other "South African War 1901–1902".

His daughter Dorothy donated the military effects of Eden's father to the Cameronian Regimental Museum in 1982, where they are still held. This includes his father's Musketry training certificate, three Commission documents, his Abyssinian War medal, a portrait photograph, and various pieces of correspondence.

The Royal Green Jackets (Rifles) Museum holds Eden's full medal entitlement in their medal room, as well as some further items relating to him.

== Bibliography ==
- Davies, Frank (1997). Bloody Red Tabs: General Officer Casualties of the Great War 1914–1918. London: Pen & Sword Books. ISBN 978-0-85052-463-5.
