= Sidney Olivier =

English cricketer (1870–1932)

Captain Sidney Olivier CMG
- Born: Sidney Richard Olivier; 1 March 1870; Wilton, Wiltshire, England
- Died: 21 January 1932 (aged 61); Horton, Dorset, England
- Cricket career

Personal information
- Role: Wicket-keeper
- Relatives: Frederick Eden (uncle); Lionel Collins (brother-in-law)

Domestic team information
- Years: Team
- 1895: Hampshire

Career statistics
Competition	First-class
Matches	1
Runs scored	0
Batting average	0.00
100s/50s	0/0
Top score	0
Catches/stumpings	3/–
- Source: Cricinfo, 22 February 2010

Sidney Richard Olivier CMG (1 March 1870 – 21 January 1932) was a Royal Navy officer and English first-class cricketer.

The son of the Canon Dacres Olivier, he was born in March 1870 at Wilton, Wiltshire. He was educated at Allhallows College in Honiton, before attending the Britannia Royal Naval College. He graduated from there into the Royal Navy as a sub-lieutenant in January 1891, with promotion to lieutenant following in June 1892. Considered a fine cricketer for the Royal Navy Cricket Club and the United Services, Olivier deputised as wicket-keeper for Charles Robson in a single first-class match for Hampshire against Leicestershire at Portsmouth in the 1895 County Championship. Batting once in the match, he was run out without scoring in Hampshire's first innings, while behind the stumps he took three catches across the match.

Olivier was promoted to commander in December 1903. In February 1905, he was placed in command of HMS Syren and was in command of Syren in May 1905 when she ran aground during exercises at Berehaven and was severely damaged. He was subsequently reprimanded by a court-martial, which determined his actions amounted to an error of judgement, with Olivier being relieved of his command. He later served in the First World War as commander of HMS St George, and from 1916 to 1919 he was the senior naval officer at Salonika. He was mentioned in despatches four times during the war and shortly after the war, he was made a Companion of the Order of St Michael and St George in the 1919 New Year Honours. In March 1920, he retired from active service and was granted the rank of captain.

Olivier was honoured by various allied powers for his service in the war. He was decorated by France with the Legion of Honour, by the Kingdom of Greece with the Order of the Redeemer, and by the Kingdom of Serbs, Croats and Slovenes with the Order of the White Eagle. Olivier died in January 1932 at Horton, Dorset; he was survived by two sons and three daughters. His uncle, Frederick Morton Eden, and brother-in-law, Lionel Collins, both played first-class cricket.
