= Lionel Collins =

English cricketer and British Indian Army officer

Brigadier Lionel Peter Collins CB CSI DSO OBE
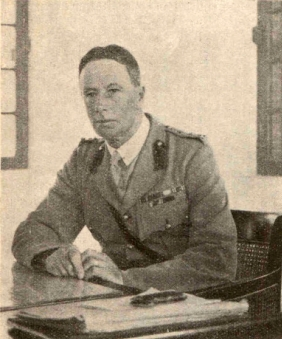
- As commandant of the Indian Military College, 1935
- Born: 27 November 1878; Reading, Berkshire, England
- Died: 28 September 1957 (aged 78); Fleet, Hampshire, England
- Family: Sidney Olivier (brother-in-law); Louis Hunt (son-in-law)
- Military career
- Allegiance: United Kingdom
- Branch: British Army
- Service years: 1900–1936
- Commands: Indian MIlitary College
- Wars: First World War; Battle of Neuve Chapelle\; Third Anglo-Afghan War
- Cricket career

Cricket information
- Batting: Right-handed

Domestic team information
- Years: Team
- 1897–1913: Berkshire
- 1899: Oxford University
- 1907–1910: Marylebone Cricket Club

Career statistics
Competition	First-class
Matches	19
Runs scored	858
Batting average	26.81
100s/50s	1/3
Top score	102*
Catches/stumpings	5/–
- Source: Cricinfo, 13 January 2019

Brigadier Lionel Peter Collins, CB CSI DSO OBE (27 November 1878 – 28 September 1957) was an English cricketer and British Indian Army officer.

Born in Reading, Collins was educated at Marlborough College, a public school in Wiltshire, and first played minor counties cricket for his native Berkshire in 1897. He went up to Keble College, Oxford, in 1898, where he made first-class debut in 1899 for Oxford University Cricket Club. He joined the British Army upon leaving Oxford in 1900 and spent most of his early career serving in British India. In 1904, playing for a Gurkha Brigade team, he made two centuries in the same match, and repeated this achievement twice in the span of ten days: a feat described by Wisden as "quite without parallel in the history of the game".

Collins made his final first-class appearances before the First World War, playing for the Marylebone Cricket Club, for the Army and Navy, and for the Free Foresters. During the war, he served with the Gurkhas on the Western Front and received the Distinguished Service Order in 1915 for actions during the Battle of Neuve Chapelle. He later returned to India and was mentioned in dispatches for service in Baluchistan during 1918. Collins was with British forces during the Third Anglo-Afghan War of 1919 and was appointed an Officer of the Order of the British Empire for his actions. From 1932 to 1936 he was the first commandant of the Indian Military College at Dehra Dun.

Collins was made a Companion of the Order of the Bath in 1934, and also made aide-de-camp to King George V. He retired from the army in October 1936 and died at Fleet, Hampshire, on 28 September 1957.

== Early life, cricket and military career ==
The seventh son of Henry Collins, he was born at Reading on 27 November 1878. Collins was educated at Marlborough College, before going up to Keble College, Oxford in 1898. He had debuted in minor counties cricket for Berkshire in 1897, before debuting in first-class cricket for Oxford University against AJ Webbe's XI at Oxford in 1899. He made six further first-class appearances for the university, all of which came in 1899 and gained him a blue. While attending Oxford, he also gained a blue in hockey.

After graduating from Oxford, Collins enlisted in the British Army in April 1900 as a second lieutenant in the part-time 6th (Worcestershire Militia) Battalion, Worcestershire Regiment. He transferred to a regular army battalion in January of the following year. In October 1901 he was seconded to serve in British India with the Indian Staff Corps, being promoted to lieutenant on 21 December. Collins toured India with a Gurkha Brigade cricket team in February 1904 and three times in ten days made two centuries in the same match. Wisden described the feat as "quite without parallel in the history of the game".

Collins returned to England in 1907, when he played eight first-class matches for the Marylebone Cricket Club (MCC), including two on their 1907 tour of North America. He also played seven matches for Berkshire in the 1907 Minor Counties Championship. By 1910, he was serving in the 4th Gorkha Rifles and was promoted to captain in March of that year.

Collins once again returned to England in the summer of 1910, where he resumed playing first-class cricket. He made one appearance for the MCC against Oxford University, and appeared for the combined Army and Navy cricket team against Oxford and Cambridge Universities at Aldershot, as well as appearing for Berkshire in minor counties cricket. Collins made two final first-class appearances in 1913 for the Free Foresters. Across nineteen first-class matches, he scored 858 runs at an average of 26.81. He made one century, a score of 102 not out against Oxford University in 1910. He played his final minor counties match for Berkshire in the same year, having by that point appeared for the county in 42 Minor Counties Championship matches.

== WWI and later military career ==
Collins served with the Gurkhas in the First World War, during which he received the Distinguished Service Order in May 1915 for gallantry and devotion to duty during an attack on a German trench during the Battle of Neuve Chapelle. He was made a brevet major in June 1916, and was confirmed permanently in the rank in April 1917. He was made a temporary lieutenant colonel while in change of a battalion in May 1917. He returned to British India with the Gurkhas in 1918, where he was mentioned in dispatches during action in Baluchistan. Shortly after the conclusion of the war, he was again made a temporary lieutenant colonel while in change of a battalion in January 1919, but relinquished the rank the following month. Collins served in the Third Anglo-Afghan War of 1919 and was appointed an Officer of the Order of the British Empire on 3 August 1920 for his role in this campaign.

He was appointed to the rank of lieutenant colonel permanently in February 1925. From 1 January 1932 to 1936 Collins was the first commandant of the Indian Military College at Dehra Dun and was granted the temporary rank of brigadier while employed in this role. He was appointed as a Companion of the Order of the Bath in the 1934 Birthday Honours. In the 1936 Birthday Honours he was made a Companion to the Order of the Star of India. From 1934 to 1936, Collins was an aide-de-camp to George V, ceasing in the post upon the king's death in January 1936. He retired from military service in October 1936, upon which he was granted the honorary rank of brigadier.

Collins died at Fleet, Hampshire, at the age of 78, on 28 September 1957.

== Family ==
Collins married Gladys Lysaght in 1910. The couple had two sons (Peter Rutherford Collins born in 1911 and John Humphrey Collins born in Quetta, India, in 1918) and one daughter, Rosemary Emily Collins.

== Honours and awards ==
- 8 May 1915 – Captain Lionel Peter Collins, 1st Battalion, 4th Gurkha Rifles is appointed a Companion of the Distinguished Service Order in recognition of his gallantry and devotion to duty whilst serving with the Expedition Force:

For conspicuous gallantry throughout the campaign, especially on 12th March, 1915, when he took the initiative with his Company in the attack at Bios de Biez and captured a German trench, took 100 prisoners, killing or wounding a considerable number of the remainder of the occupants.

— The London Gazette

Military offices
Preceded by New post	Commandant of the Indian Military Academy; 1932–1936	Succeeded by Harold Kingsley
