= Denis Eden =

English artist (1878–1949)

- Born: 20 July 1878; Liverpool, England, UK
- Died: 30 October 1949 (aged 71); Ely, Cambridgeshire, UK
- Known for: Painting and Illustration

William Denis Eden (20 July 1878 – 30 October 1949) was a Liverpool-born artist whose lively and idiosyncratic paintings were in a ‘neo-Pre-Raphaelite’ style. He trained at the St John's Wood Art School and the Royal Academy Schools, and went on to exhibit regularly at the Royal Academy. He was married to the poet Helen Parry Eden, and in the interwar years they divided their time between Oxfordshire and Italy. He illustrated a children’s book and provided drawings for his wife’s ‘medieval’ tales.

== Early life and influences ==
William Denis Eden was born in Liverpool on 20 July 1878. His father, also William Eden (1844–1913), was a landscape painter. By 1885 the family had moved to St John's Wood, London, and Denis attended St John's Wood Preparatory School in Acacia Road – known as 'Oliver's' – which he remembered with some dread.

From there he progressed to University College School in Gower Street. The school was a preparatory school for University College, London, and untypically had no corporal punishment and no religious education, and the curriculum included modern languages as well as Latin. On Wednesday afternoons he attended drawing classes there, run by Frederic George Stephens. A correspondent writing in The Times about Stephens in 1959 reflected that most of the boys had no idea of the importance of 'the slightly eccentric elderly man' in relation to the art world and 'if we had been told of it we should have been unimpressed. To us he was a rather curious old character who made us copy rather dull casts … That he was a close friend of Rosetti, Holman Hunt, Millais and the other leading lights of the P.R.B. [Pre-Raphaelite Brotherhood] would have meant very little to us.' Eden's father was a successful exhibiting artist, and would presumably have been fully aware of the PRB, who were important in the development of mid-nineteenth-century British art.

As a regular exhibitor at the Royal Academy, Eden Sr would also have known that St John's Wood Art School provided one of the best progression routes into the Royal Academy Schools. Denis Eden attended from 1894, and his family were living in Belsize Park, London.

== The Royal Academy Schools ==
While at St John's Wood Art School, Denis Eden became friends with Frank Cadogan Cowper (1877–1958), and they both went on to study at the Royal Academy Schools – Eden from 1898 to 1901, and Cadogan Cowper from 1897 to 1902.

By the turn of the century, the Slade School of Art was seen to be the foremost art school in England and 'had eclipsed the Royal Academy in terms of its fertility in producing significant artists'. Slade alumni such as Augustus John, William Orpen and Wyndham Lewis 'always kept their eyes on what was being done in Paris', and would exhibit with the New English Art Club in preference to the Royal Academy. However, Eden, Cadogan Cowper and another Royal Academy student, Campbell Lindsay Smith, shunned this emerging modernism and were enthralled by the now unfashionable Pre-Raphaelite Brotherhood. An 1899 letter from Cadogan Cowper to his mother reveals a certain gaucheness in the young twenty-somethings as they visited Eden's drawing master, F. G. Stephens: '[He] was not there, but his "stunning" wife was. They handled Millais's pen drawing for the Carpenter's Shop. They also saw many drawings by Holman Hunt, Rossetti and Madox Brown. They drank tea from Christina Rossetti's cups … They felt to have dropped in on what was left of the Pre-Raphaelite world. Mrs. Stephens … "seems to know everyone intimately" from Lord Leighton to Miss Siddal and told stories about them all. [Cadogan Cowper] and Eden want to get to know Holman Hunt, but won't say anything until they are more practiced [sic]'.

== The New Brotherhood ==
Eden, Cadogan Cowper and Smith saw themselves as 'the New Brotherhood', and initially their aim was to travel around Britain to see as many Pre-Raphaelite paintings as they could. The young artists shared their techniques: '[Cadogan Cowper] has completed a small self-portrait using Eden's method and thinks it his best work, he has confidence in his painting for the first time. He and Eden understand the method of painting better than all the Pre-Raphaelites other than Millais'. Disappointingly for Eden, his submissions were rejected by the 1899 Royal Academy selection panel, although Cowper had two pencil portraits chosen. A portrait of Denis Eden by Wolfram Onslow-Ford (1879–1956) – another young neo-Pre-Raphaelite artist, also from the Royal Academy Schools – was exhibited and favourably reviewed in the Daily Telegraph that year.

In 1901 Eden had his first work accepted for the Royal Academy summer exhibition. The moralistic-sounding Sluggard is listed in the RA catalogue with an uncredited verse: 'He who defers his work from day to day, / Does on the river's brink expecting stay, / 'Till the whole stream which stopt him shall be gone, / Which as it runs, for ever will run on.' In the following year two of Eden's paintings were selected. Robinson Crusoe was hung at a disadvantageous height on the gallery wall: 'As far as one could tell Mr. Eden had grappled with a curious and difficult effect of lighting, in which he had by no means failed. In the tenth gallery a slightly larger work was so hung as to afford better examination. In Decerpta I think Mr. Eden has done his finest work. The simple face of a child enshrouded with an atmosphere of mystery. I found the picture entrancing.'

== To Italy ==
In the spring of 1903 the 'New Brotherhood' set off to Italy – crossing the English Channel to Calais before travelling first to Assisi and then on to Siena. By February 1904 they were back in London in time to submit to that year's summer exhibition. Eden had two paintings selected: The Power of Fancy and Eat to Live.

Early in 1905 Denis Eden was still living with his parents, now at 76 Adelaide Road in Swiss Cottage. The enigmatically titled Exit was chosen for the summer exhibition, while his father had a watercolour, A Rainy Harvest, selected. In this year Eden also seemed to be renting some accommodation – perhaps studio space – nearby.

== Meeting Helen Parry ==
Around this time Denis Eden became friends with Helen Parry Parry (sic). Seven years younger than Denis, Helen was the eldest daughter of the lawyer Edward Abbott Parry and was educated at Roedean School in Sussex. When she was 18 she studied for the preliminary examination in Arts at Manchester University (officially taking Latin and French, but she also appears to have attended history lectures). She won the Vice-Chancellor's Prize for English verse in 1904, and progressed to study painting at the Women's Department of King's College London – based at Kensington Square – where the artist Byam Shaw had just started teaching. Shaw was six years older than Denis Eden but shared a similar background, having attended St John's Wood Art School before the Royal Academy Schools, and was also influenced by the Pre-Raphaelite movement in style and subject matter. It seems likely that Helen Parry was in turn influenced by Shaw's medievalist aesthetic – although there seem to be no available reproductions of her work.

== A playful medievalist aesthetic ==
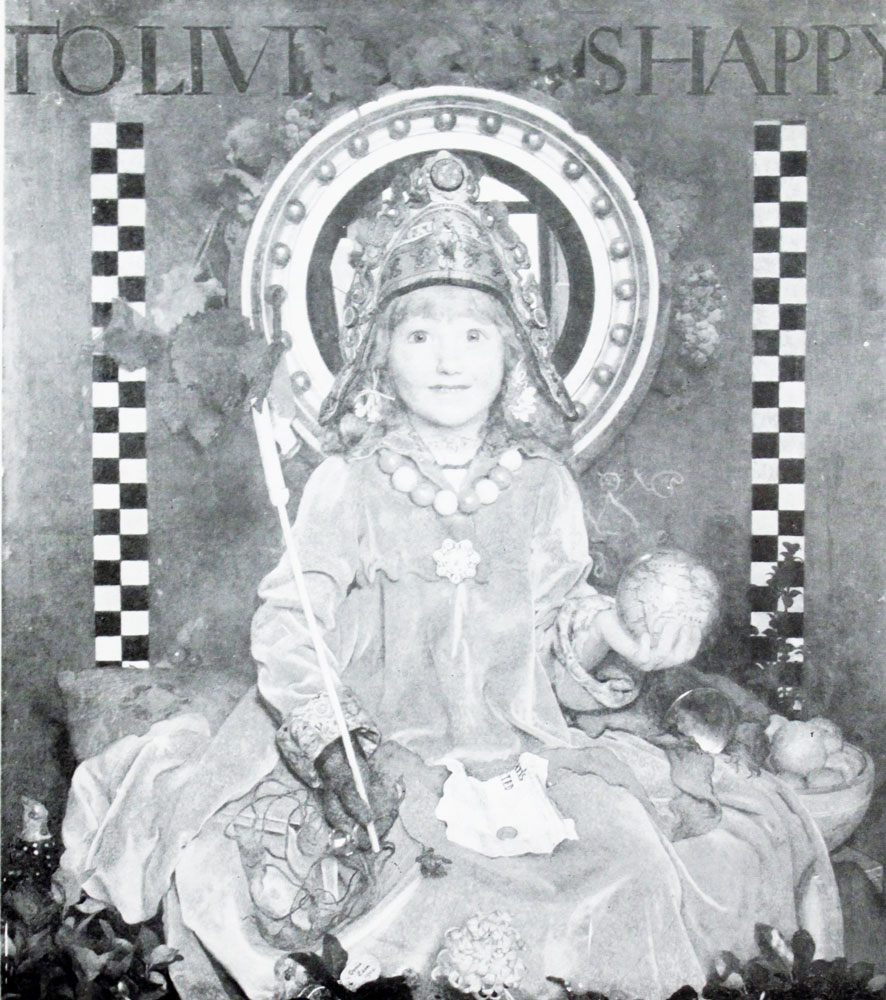
The Luxury of Vain Imagination exhibited at the Royal Academy in 1906

Eden had two paintings selected for the 1906 Royal Academy summer exhibition – Gentleness in a Lion Skin and The Luxury of Vain Imagination – and one of these was sold for £120. The Luxury of Vain Imagination was reproduced in The Graphic, and this reveals a very original and exuberant 'portrait' that can be seen as an eccentric spin on portraiture of the Northern European Renaissance. Above all else, Eden's work shows a sense of humour that is absent from the Pre-Raphaelite oeuvre. The Graphic commented on 'a vivid bit of humorous satire, a caricature apparently of a picture by Mr. Gotch [Thomas Cooper Gotch], of a laughing child holding a tiny world sweet box and a monkey on a stick as ball and sceptre.'

Eden and Parry shared a passion for art and the medieval, but they also shared a playfulness evident in Eden's paintings and later seen in Parry's critical writings and poems. In the year of their marriage, 1907, Eden exhibited Peire of Valeria – the subject being a twelfth-century troubadour from Gascony. The painting shows Peire studying a mouse resting on his hand, and a similar light-hearted meditation on man's relationship to animals would be a major theme of Helen Parry Eden's poems in a both playful but simultaneously religious way.

== Marriage and Catholicism ==
The couple were married on 10 July 1907 at St Saviour's Church, Hampstead, and moved from London to Saffron Walden, where a daughter, Hilary Joan Eden, was born in October 1908.

In 1909 Helen and Denis Eden 'were received into the Catholic Church by the Reverend Dr Arendzen at Saffron Walden'. The church of Our Lady of Compassion had been established in Saffron Walden only two years previously by the Catholic Missionary Society, and John Arendzen was one of a small group of priests from that society to set up a base there. The Eden family were then living five miles out of Saffron Walden in the village of Rickling, just inside the Essex border. Two paintings were selected for that year's summer exhibition: A Portrait and Green Felicity. The Times reviewed the latter with mixed feelings:

A pleasing variation on the general work of the exhibition is the 'Green Felicity' (418) of Mr. Denis Eden, one of the few young painters who follow the Pre-Raphaelite tradition. We will not venture to guess what it means or what the man and the strange witch-like woman are doing; but the picture is something more than quaint; it is painted with the curious daintiness of touch rare among painters today. If Mr. Eden could eschew eccentricity of subject and be content with something simple and beautiful he would make a real mark.

== The House of Commons murals project ==
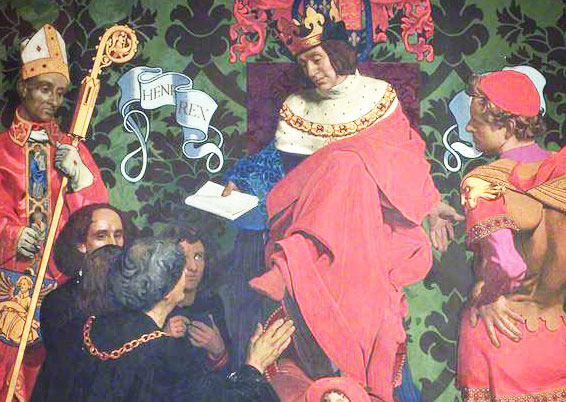
John Cabot and His Sons Receive the Charter from Henry VII to Sail in Search of New Lands, 1496 (detail) 1910

Eden's friend Frank Cadogan Cowper, along with the artist Ernest Board, had been working as a studio assistant on mural projects for Edwin Austin Abbey, such as the monumental canvas The Coronation of King Edward VII, now in the Royal Collection. In 1908 Abbey was appointed artistic advisor on a mural project for the House of Commons' East Corridor, where six spaces had been allocated for a series of large panels (81 inches by 83 inches) on the theme of the Tudor period. In order to create stylistic unity, Abbey chose six young artists working in a 'neo-Pre-Raphaelite' mode, and further unifying aspects in relation to colour and scale were imposed on them. Frank Cadogan Cowper, Eden, Board and Byam Shaw were joined by Henry Payne and Frank O. Salisbury. Salisbury had just finished the mural decorations with Abbey at the Royal Exchange, London, and Payne was a Birmingham artist who worked primarily in large-scale stained glass. The artists were paid £400 each. An article in The Times explained that 'The process adopted is not that of fresco proper … but one more suited to the London air – that known as marophlage [or marouflage], in which the paint is laid on canvas, which is afterwards fastened to the wall.' Eden's allocated subject, John Cabot and His Sons Receive the Charter from Henry VII to Sail in Search of New Lands, 1496, celebrates Tudor global dominance at sea. The mural would be his most high-profile and most lucrative work – although when the series was presented to the public its neo-Pre-Raphaelite style was not to everyone's taste.

== The Order of the Servants of Mary ==
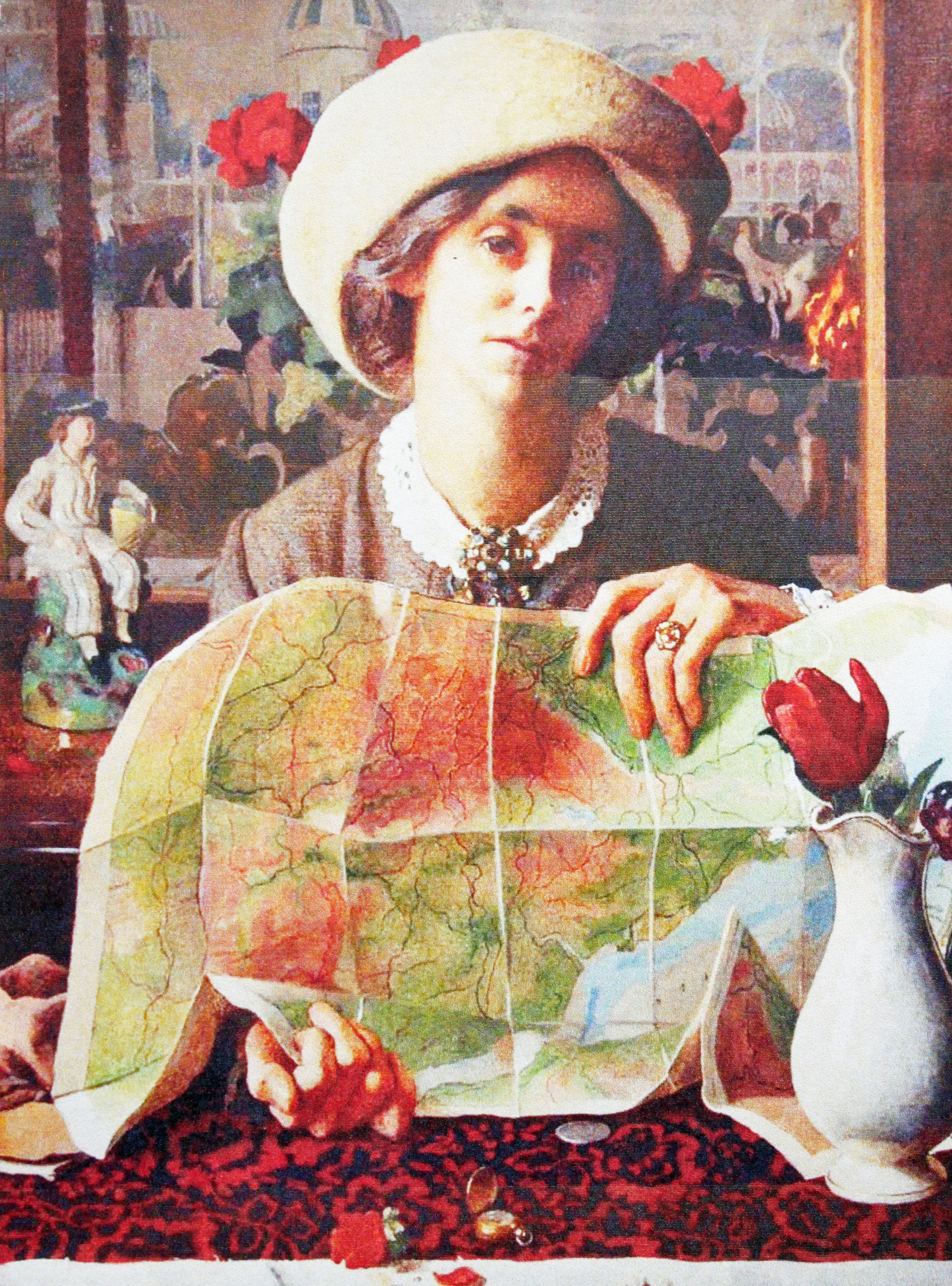
Griselda at the 'Wheatsheaf'. A portrait of Helen Parry Eden, 1911

Perhaps in order to work on this project, the family briefly moved back to London, living at 262 Fulham Road, South Kensington, in premises that seem to have been part of Our Lady of Dolours – the church of the Servite Friars (the Order of the Servants of Mary). Helen Eden's devotion to the Servite Order would become central to her religious beliefs.

Eden's The Princess of Kensington was selected for the Royal Academy in 1910. The title may have been an affectionate reference to his wife, who had studied at Kensington Square.

Perhaps not wanting to be seen only as a 'neo-Pre-Raphaelite', Eden painted Griselda at the 'Wheatsheaf' in 1911, motivated by the 'idea to make a modern picture'. This portrait of the artist's wife nonetheless makes playful reference to Northern Renaissance portraiture – with a shallow pictorial space and being crammed with potentially symbolic artefacts. The reference to Helen as 'Griselda' should not, one suspects, be taken too seriously, but in referring to Chaucer's 'The Clerk's Tale' (from The Canterbury Tales) there is surely a tribute to Helen as the loyal wife. The painting is presented as something of a 'problem picture' – a narrative tease by the artist of a kind that was popular at the Royal Academy from the turn of the century. Eden explained that 'There's no story connected with the picture … Everyone must make their own.' He went on to say that 'We were in rooms at the time it was painted, househunting, and Griselda is a portrait of my wife. She is supposed to be stopping at an inn, where she is opening a map to see the best route after having lunched'. The Wheatsheaf Inn at Braishfield, Hampshire, is seven miles from Michelmersh – the village to which the Edens moved – and may be the inn referenced in the picture's title.

== From Michelmersh to Battersea ==
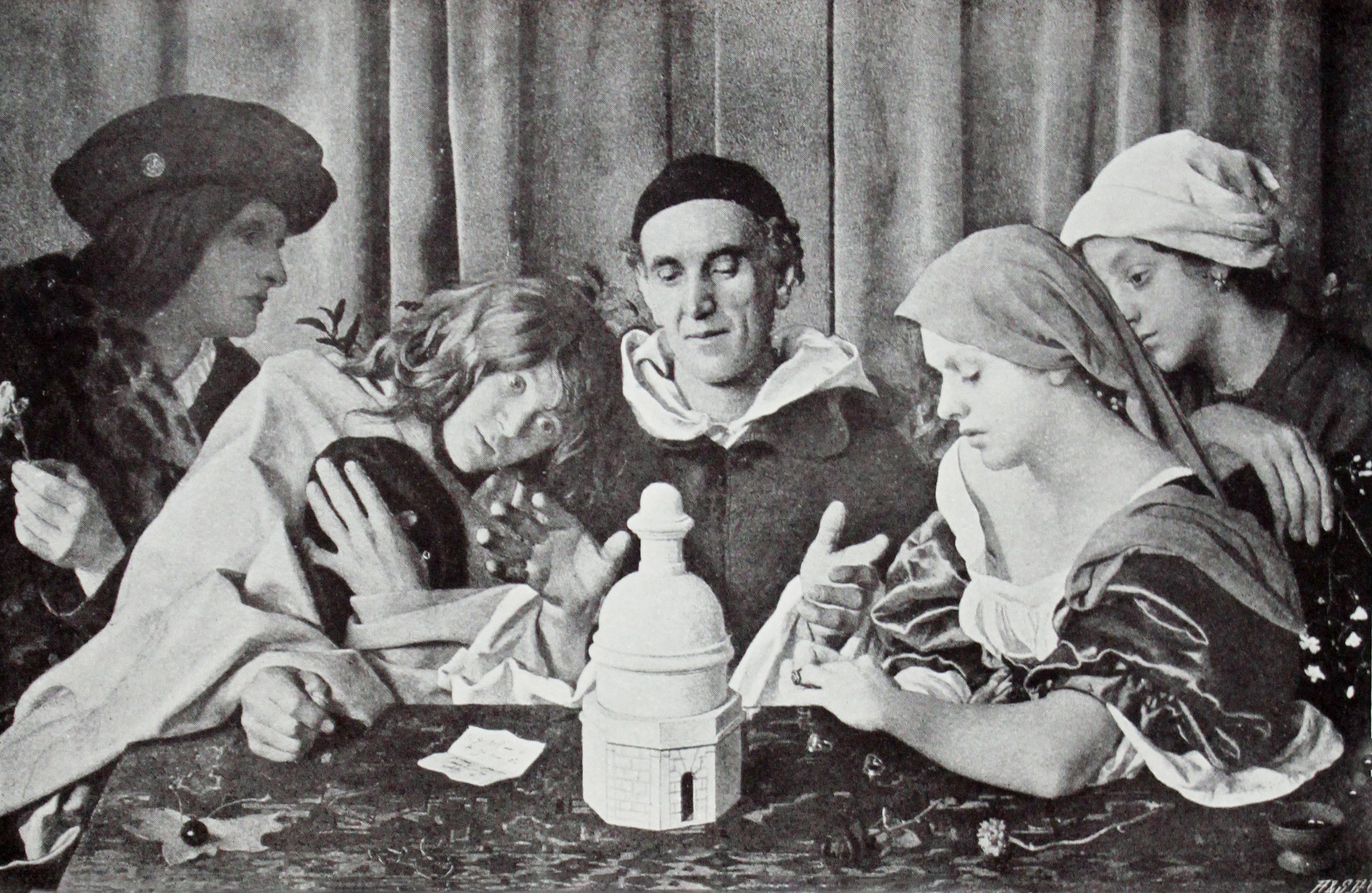
Black and white reproduction of Ex-Voto exhibited at the Royal Academy, 1914

At the time of the 1911 census Denis and Helen Eden were staying as visitors at Michelmersh House, Michelmersh, Romsey, Hampshire – this may have during been the 'househunting' referred to apropos the Griselda portrait, as their daughter, Hilary Joan Eden, stayed with her grandparents in Ruislip – west of London. By 1912 the family had a Michelmersh address when Eden exhibited a watercolour – The Ash Settle – at the Royal Academy. Rural Michelmersh is lovingly captured in Helen Eden's poems of the time; however, after she again became pregnant the family briefly moved back to London in the following year – to an upstairs flat in Battersea. Helen Eden's parents were living in the neighbouring borough of Lambeth at this time. The Eden family's exodus from Hampshire on a large wagon accommodating Denis, Helen, 3-year-old Hilary, the nurse, the cook, their worldly goods and an adopted farm-cat is amusingly captured in Helen's poem '"Four Paws" in London'. Their son, Peter Mary Gerard Eden, was born in London in May 1913.

Salvator Parvalorum was Eden's first painting to be exhibited abroad – at the Ghent Exposition Universelle in 1913 – and it seems that Helen and Denis travelled to Belgium during the Exposition's run.

Helen Eden regularly published poems and reviews in Punch and a number of other periodicals. An anthology of her verse, Bread and Circuses, was published by John Lane in 1914. Many of the poems are on the theme of motherhood and are addressed to the Eden's young daughter, who has been given some anonymity as 'Betsy-Jane'. Bread and Circuses was praised as 'an excellent little book of verse' by G. K. Chesterton in the Illustrated London News, and was favourably reviewed by Thomas Bodkin.

The stay in Battersea was brief: by spring of 1914 the Edens were living at Abingdon, Berkshire (later designated as Oxfordshire). Eden had two works selected for the Royal Academy that year: The Alms-Person's Parlour and Ex voto, the latter being illustrated in Royal Academy Pictures and Sculpture 1914.

== A conscientious objector ==
The First World War began in July 1914, and by the time of the following year's Royal Academy summer exhibition the Edens had purchased a property in the Cotswolds: Waterfall House in the medieval town of Burford, Oxfordshire. The public showed little appetite for purchasing art at this time of crisis, and The Old Apple Tree was not sold when exhibited at the RA in 1915. However, it was bought later in the year when it was exhibited in Walker Art Gallery's autumn exhibition and it was gifted anonymously to the gallery.

A third child, Mary Simonetta Parry Eden, was born in May 1916, and three works were selected for the Royal Academy that year: The Boy in Brown; Holland, Betsey-Jane and Anthony. The precarious finances of an up-and-coming artist such as Eden can be seen from a breakdown of his annual income around now. With about £150 coming in from the sale of paintings, he was not earning enough to be paying income tax. The family were subsidised with an irregular allowance of £75 from Eden's mother and an allowance of £200 from Helen's parents. In 1916 the Military Service Act introduced compulsory conscription to Great Britain. There was provision in the act for conscientious objectors – those with genuine objections on religious or moral grounds – to be excused military service. To that end Eden appeared before a tribunal in Oxfordshire in July 1916. In addition to his conscientious objections, he pleaded ill health and serious financial hardship. A decision was made in favour of him carrying out non-combative service. But he was unsuccessful in getting work as an assistant at Littlemore Asylum, and in February 1917 he was ordered to undertake farm work. However, after a few days of working on a farm in Summertown he had to give this up as he was not strong enough. Eden's appeal for further exemption was refused, and it is not known what nature his non-combative service took thereafter.

== Family separation ==
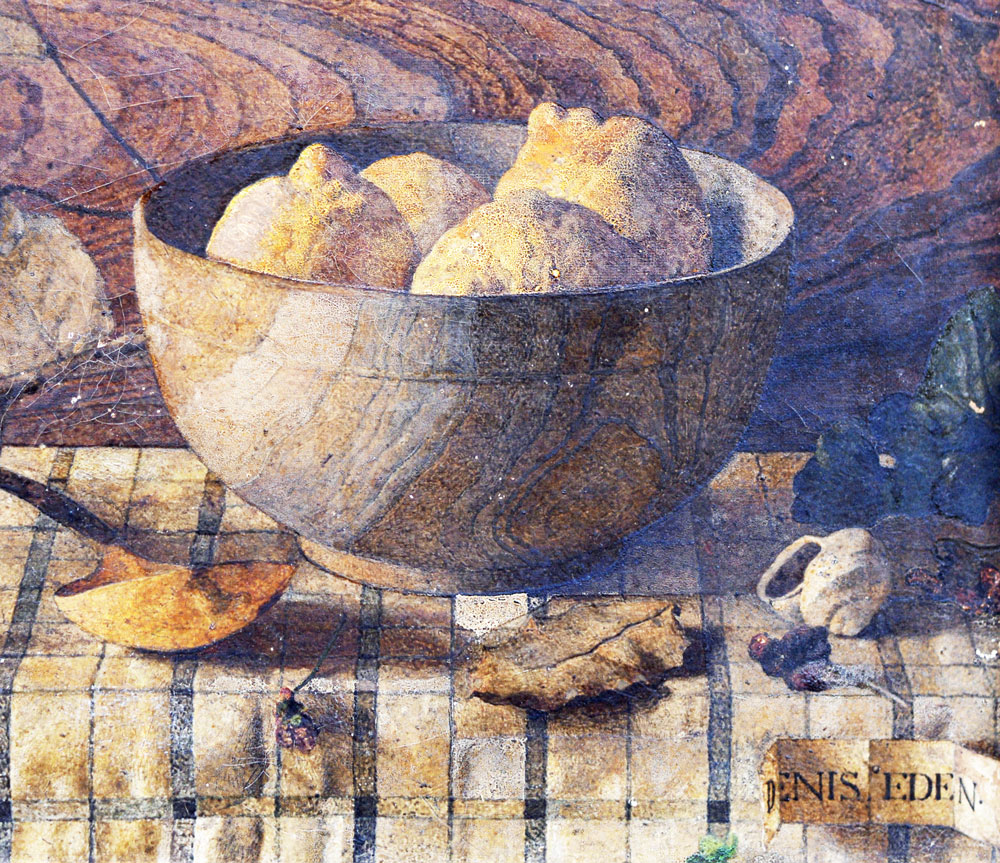
A Bowl of Lemons exhibited at the Royal Academy in 1920

With Eden threatened with prison and ordered into non-combative service, it seems likely that there was some family separation at this point. A further collection of Helen Parry Eden's poetry, Coal and Candlelight, was published by John Lane in 1918. There is more devotional verse in this collection, and also reflections on war – including the tribunal. Some poems reflect a degree of political cynicism. In a prefatory note she gave 'Begbroke' as her address. The family (perhaps without Denis) were at Priory Cottage – a lodge house attached to the Priory of St Philip, a large Georgian building that had originally been Begbroke Manor House. The priory was a novitiate house – a training establishment – for the Roman Catholic Servite Friars. Helen Eden was a tertiary – i.e. a lay member – of the Servite Order. As an aspect of her devotional work she undertook two educational projects with the Catholic publishers Burns & Oates. The Rhyme of the Servants of Mary (1919) was a 25-page booklet (with an illustration by Denis Eden) that retold the legend of the founding of the Servite Order. A String of Sapphires – Being Mysteries of the Life and Death of Our Blessed Lord and Saviour Jesus Christ, Put into English Verse for the Young and Simple was a more substantial book, of 173 pages, published in January 1920.

== The End of the Track ==
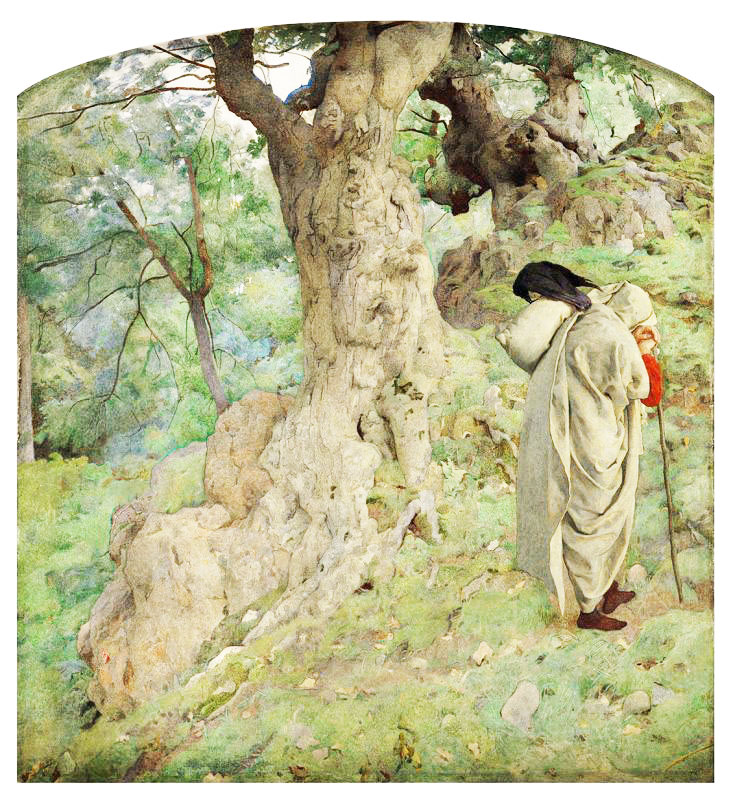
The End of the Track exhibited in 1921

As Denis Eden re-established himself as an exhibiting artist after the war, A Posy from the Red Lion was shown by the Oxford Art Society at the Ashmolean Museum in Oxford in 1919. The Oxford Chronicle considered it 'by far the best flower picture' in the exhibition. Between 1919 and 1923 Eden had twelve paintings selected for the Royal Academy summer exhibitions; these were mainly still-life compositions – perhaps more sellable than big statement works. It seems as if he was acting on the advice given in The Times in 1909 to 'eschew eccentricity of subject and be content with something simple and beautiful'. The punningly titled Souvenir d' Hélène – another flower picture – in 1919 was followed by The Bowl of Lemons in 1920, in which Eden showed an ongoing referencing of Northern Renaissance still-life painting, including the placing of his a signature on a trompe l'œil 'label'. The Brown Jug was shown in the same year, while Unconsidered Trifles, Petals and Pewter and Good News from a Far Country appeared in 1921; The Province of the Woodpecker, Chrysanthemums and Amber, Saffron and Cinnabar in 1922; and Copper and Brown and The Advocate's Door in 1923.

The End of the Track (aka A Pilgrim), exhibited at the autumn exhibition of the Royal West of England Academy in 1921, was a more narrative work that had some similarities to the earlier Old Apple Tree. The arched top of the frame was a device often used by the Pre-Raphaelites to reference early Renaissance art, and the work is clearly an allegory on the transience of man: 'A gnarled and ancient tree, disfigured with gargoyles of anthropomorphic knots, grows seamlessly out of the rock with a new sapling beyond. An old man rests upon his staff on the path whilst a crow pecks a hole in his bundle, releasing a fine stream of grain, like sand in an hourglass.' Portrait of a Young Woman, shown in 1923, may have been a portrait of his daughter Hilary, then aged 15.

== A modern medievalist ==
Helen Eden's time at Begbroke was hugely productive. She was now established as an academic and literary critic, writing in the highly esteemed Dublin Review, for example, and regularly contributing to Blackfriars, a magazine founded in 1920 as a focus of Catholic Christian reflection on current events. A profile article on her by Katherine Brégy in Catholic World described her as a 'Modern Medievalist': 'When the Oxford anchorite is not speaking in poetry, she divides her pen between sprightly book-reviews for Punch … and a series of medieval prose legends contributed to other magazines. There is much charm and piquancy in these pointed and moraled tales dug up nominally from the archives of the Bodleian but essentially from her own fancy'.

Brégy also explained Helen Eden's personal circumstances in 1923: 'Mrs. Eden to-day is a modern and feminine "clerk of Oxford" living chiefly alone with her flocks of fancies – since the schools have carried off her children, and Italy has carried off her husband because of temporary ill-health.' But she clarified the importance of the Eden's marital relationship 'Then may come a visit to Vicenza (which means a visit to "Denis"!)'.

The nature of Denis Eden's ill-health is not known, and there are no details of his stay in Vicenza; however, Vicenza's Basilica di S. Maria di Monte Berico is a church of the Servite Order, and it may have been through international connections with the Priory of St Philip at Begbroke that Eden came to be in the city. Vicenza inspired two paintings chosen for the Royal Academy in 1924 – Tempo di Siesta and In the City of Palladio – and probably also the street scenes of 'Caper' that, when populated with little bears ('Ursors'), formed the basis of his book A Guide to Caper the following year. A view of the city, The End of the Summer Vicenza, dated 1923, may have marked the end of his stay.

== A move to Woodstock ==
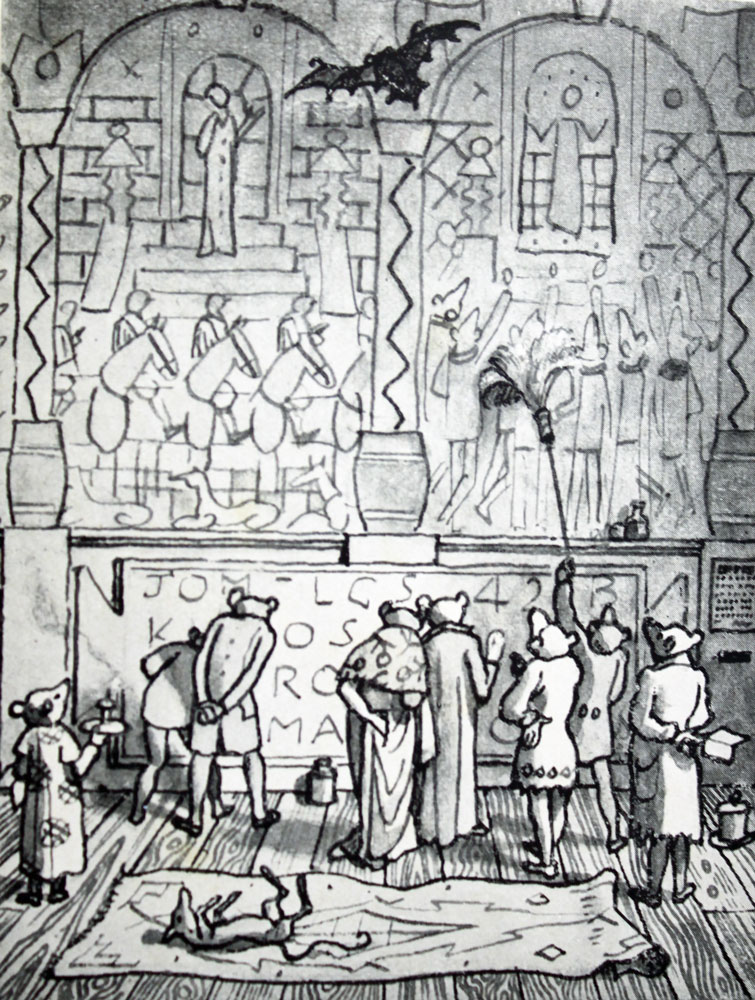
'The Royal Palace - Frescoes in the Condemned Wing' an illustration from A Guide to Caper, published in 1924

By 1924, Denis and Helen Eden had moved from Begbroke to nearby Woodstock. Eden's imaginatively embellished drawings of Vicenza – fictionalised as 'Caper' and populated with bears – were the basis of a collaboration with Thomas Bodkin, lawyer, art critic, director of the National Gallery of Ireland and family friend, who provided the text. A Guide to Caper used a whimsical guidebook structure and, with no narrative development or recognisable protagonists, its appeal was as much to adult as to child readers.

With no further work exhibited at the Royal Academy until 1928, there may have been further extensive periods in Italy for Denis Eden – and perhaps for the family. Writing in 1925 Helen Eden commented, 'Having been all my life a great lover of Italy, I have to while away the time when I am not actually in 'the land of lands' by reading books about it.' Souvenir of 1840 – 'a dainty still life' shown in 1928 – was the last work that Eden exhibited at the RA. The Eden's British address in 1928 was The Old Church House at Woodstock, but they had 'found a second home' in Italy. Eden was elected an associate of the Royal West of England Academy in 1928, and in the following year became a full member.

== St Hugh of Lincoln at Woodstock ==
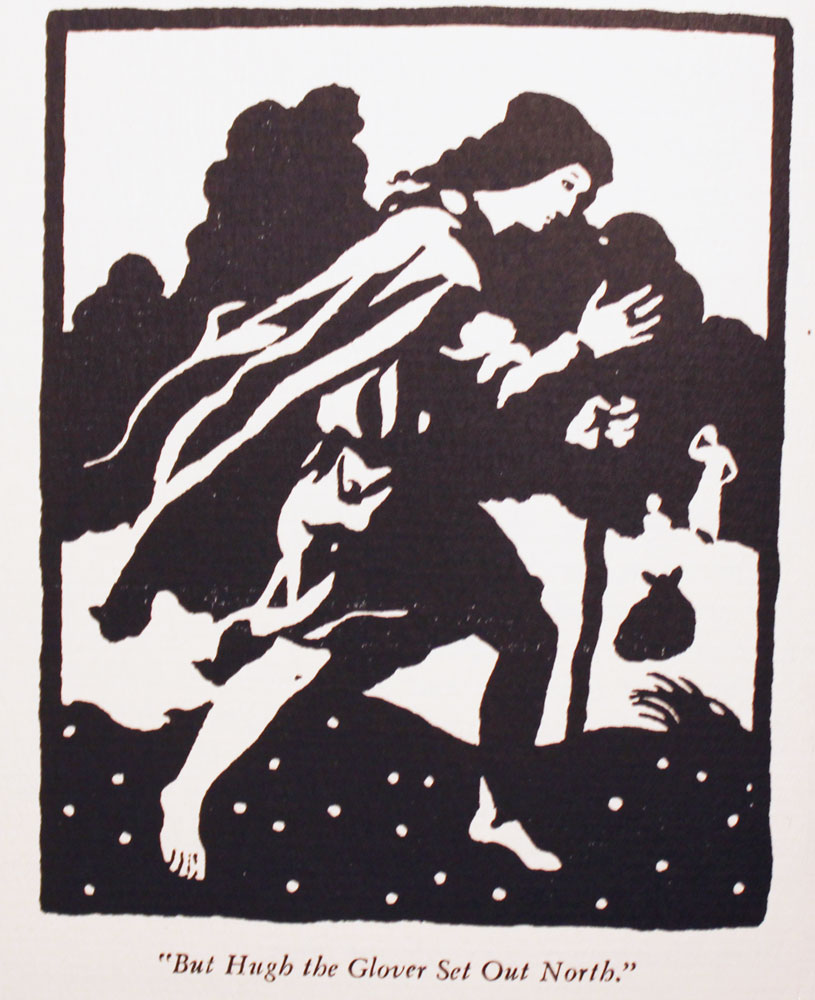
Illustration for Whistles of Silver and Other Stories published in America in 1933

In 1932 Helen Eden became vice-president of the Poetry Society, and in the following year Denis contributed illustrations to a collection of her 'medieval' stories for Blackfriars magazine republished in America as Whistles of Silver and Other Stories.

There was no Roman Catholic church in Woodstock when the Edens moved there; however, a church was built, and Helen Parry was instrumental in suggesting the dedication to St Hugh of Lincoln as 'he was the only saint known to have any connection to Woodstock.' In 1933 Father Stephen Webb was appointed as the first parish priest, and the official opening and blessing of the church took place on 17 June 1934. Katherine Brégy in 1937 referred to Denis Eden as being 'well known … for church decorations in England', but it does not seem that Eden contributed to the decoration of this new church.

== Final years ==
As the Second World War broke out in September 1939, Denis and Helen Eden were living at 181 Rectory Lane, Woodstock. In the 1939 England and Wales Register Denis Eden still gave his profession as 'Artist', while Helen Eden was 'Author, Literary Critic on Staff of "Punch"', although after the last collection of her work in 1943 she largely stopped writing.

Denis Eden died on 30 October 1949, at the age of 71, at Brook House, Fordham, Ely, Cambridgeshire, which may have been a care home. Helen Eden was apparently still living in Rectory Lane, Woodstock. His funeral and requiem mass were held at St Philip's Priory, Begbroke, on 3 November.

Helen Eden lived another eleven years in Woodstock. In the Catholic newspaper The Tablet, Father Illtud Evans, O.P., wrote, 'The last ten years of her life had been for Helen Parry Eden, who died on 19 December, a time of constant pain and loneliness. There were few to remember.'

Little is known of Denis and Helen Eden's daughters, but their brother, Peter, married in 1937 and went on to have three children. In the 1939 England and Wales register his occupation is recorded as ‘Economist & Thread Sales Organisation’; he was living at Palace Court, Paddington, with a housekeeper; his wife (b. 4 May 1913) was with relatives at Greatham House, Chanctonbury. In the Second World War he became a second lieutenant in the Intelligence Corps, and he is believed to have been a 'Monuments Man', part of a group of volunteer curators, artists, architects, and scholars who worked to protect art and cultural heritage from destruction during and directly following the war.

Christie's noted in June 1995 that 'Despite the fact that Denis Eden exhibited thirty-four pictures at the Royal Academy between 1900 and 1928, Eden's work is now extremely rare'. There are three paintings by Denis Eden in public collections in the UK.
