= Vicat Cole =

Vicat Cole is a surname. Notable people with the surname include:

- George Vicat Cole (1833–1893), English artist
- Rex Vicat Cole (1870–1940), English artist, son of George
