= Edén (surname) =

Edén is a surname. Notable people with the surname include:

- Gustav Edén (1891–1966), Norwegian footballer
- Nils Edén (1871–1945), Swedish politician
- Tobias Edén (born 1995), Swedish professional golfer

== See also ==
- Eden (surname)
