= Drozena Eden =

Australian rules footballer (1908–1973)

Personal information
- Full name: Drozena Wilfred Bannister Eden
- Nickname: Dribb
- Born: 26 November 1908; Queenstown, South Australia
- Died: 27 November 1973 (aged 65)
- Position: Defender

Playing career^{1}
Years	Club	Games (Goals)
1929–1936	Port Adelaide	73 (15)
- ^{1} Playing statistics correct to the end of 1936.

Drozena Wilfred Bannister Eden (26 November 1908 – 27 November 1973) was an Australian rules footballer who played for Port Adelaide in the South Australian National Football League (SANFL). He and his brother were of Mauritian descent. His career was cut short due to persistent leg and back injuries.

Eden impressed in some Port Adelaide trial games in 1929 playing in the centre for the matches, with The Advertiser describing his playing style as "outstanding".

Eden was elected practice captain for the 1935 season. He enlisted for military service on 2 July 1940.
