= Klein Eden =

Trinidadian footballer (born 1996)

Personal information
- Full name: Klein Stanley Eden Cristobal
- Date of birth: 12 December 1996 (age 29)
- Position: Midfielder

Senior career*
Years	Team	Apps	(Gls)
2017–2019	Platense	2	(0)
- * Club domestic league appearances and goals as of 16:53, 29 July 2020 (UTC)

Klein Stanley Eden Cristobal (born 12 December 1996) is a Trinidadian footballer.

== Career statistics ==
=== Club ===
As of 29 July 2020.

Club	Season	League			Cup		Continental		Other		Total	
Club	Season	Division	Apps	Goals	Apps	Goals	Apps	Goals	Apps	Goals	Apps	Goals
Platense	2017–18	Liga Salva Vida	2	0	0	0	0	0	0	0	2	0
Platense	2018–19	Liga Salva Vida	0	0	0	0	0	0	0	0	0	0
Career total			2	0	0	0	0	0	0	0	2	0
