= Edwin Eden =

English cricketer (1893–1939)

Cricket information
- Bowling: Right-arm fast-medium

Career statistics
Competition	First-class
Matches	2
Runs scored	30
Batting average	10.00
100s/50s	0/0
Top score	18*
Catches/stumpings	0/0
- Source: Cricinfo, 7 November 2022

Edwin Eden (21 April 1893 – 25 October 1939) was an English cricketer who played two first-class matches in the early 1920s, one for Gloucestershire in 1921, and the second nearly two years later for Worcestershire (which county he had played against for Gloucestershire). He only once reached double figures, when he made 18 not out in what proved to be the last of his four innings, for Worcestershire against Derbyshire.

Eden was born in Blockley, Gloucestershire; he died in Cheltenham aged only 46.
