= Michal Eden =

Israeli attorney and politician (born 1970)

Michal Eden (Hebrew: מיכל עדן; born 1970) is an Israeli politician and attorney who was Israel's first openly gay elected official when she was elected to the Tel Aviv - Jaffa city council in 1998. She is a member of the Meretz party.

When Eden was 20 years old, she broke up with her girlfriend. That is when her family found out she was gay. Her father said that if she did not change, she would need his approval to see the family. She left their house only taking a backpack of clothes, and couch-surfed. In 1990, neither the Israel Gay and Lesbian Association nor the Women's League House could find her a place to stay.

As of 1999, she had not spoken to her parents since they found out she was gay. Her family are secular Jews who emigrated to Israel from Yemen.

As time went on, her father threatened and harassed Eden and her friends. Between her experiences with her father and the prevailing negative attitude of the Knesset and government ministers, she decided to get involved in Israeli politics. One particular motivator was when Shlomo Benizri, then health minister from the Shas party, spoke out during Gay Pride that all gays and lesbians should be locked up in psychiatric wards.

In 2000, she announced she would run for the Knesset. Eden established Beit Dror for LGBT youth who are homeless because of their sexuality.
