= Sally Eden =

British geographer (1967–2016)

Sally Eden (1967–2016) was a British geographer and Professor of Human geography at the University of Hull.

== Scholarly contributions ==
Eden's research and writing focused on how society understands and manages the environment. It included issues of sustainable consumption, green lifestyles, environmental action and forms of public engagement with the environment.

In a series of research projects, Eden examined how scientific knowledge about the environment is used within and outside of government, how river restoration projects are designed and justified and how ordinary people get involved with and make sense of how environments are managed. In her writing she developed lines of analysis and argument drawing on concepts from human geography but also science and technology studies and environmental politics.

Eden's book ''Environmental Publics'' (Routledge 2017) argues that ‘the public’ is not one thing and their engagements with the environment take multiple forms.

== Publications ==
- Eden, S. “Environmental Publics”. London & New York: Routledge, 2017.
- Eden, S. “Mucky carrots and other proxies: Problematising the knowledge-fix for sustainable and ethical consumption”. Geoforum 39(2), pp. 1044–1057, 2008.
- Eden, S. “Being Fieldworthy: Environmental Knowledge Practices and the Space of the Field in Forest Certification”. Environment and Planning D: Society and Space 26, pp. 1018–1035, 2008. DOI: 10.1068/d3208
- Eden, S. “Ecological versus Social Restoration? How urban river restoration challenges but also fails to challenge the science - policy nexus in the United Kingdom”. Environment and Planning C: Politics and Space 24(5), 2006.
- Eden, S. “Environmental issues: sustainable progress?”. Progress in Human Geography 24(1), pp. 111–118, 2000.
- Eden, S. “Environmental issues: knowledge, uncertainty and the environment”. Progress in Human Geography 22(3), pp. 425–432, 1998.
- Eden, S. “Environmental Issues and Business: Implications of a Changing Agenda”. Chichester: John Wiley & Sons, 1996.
- Eden, S. “Public participation in environmental policy: considering scientific, counter-scientific and non-scientific contributions”. Public Understanding of Science 5(3), 1996.
