= William Rushbrooke Eden =

British Army officer (1873–1920)

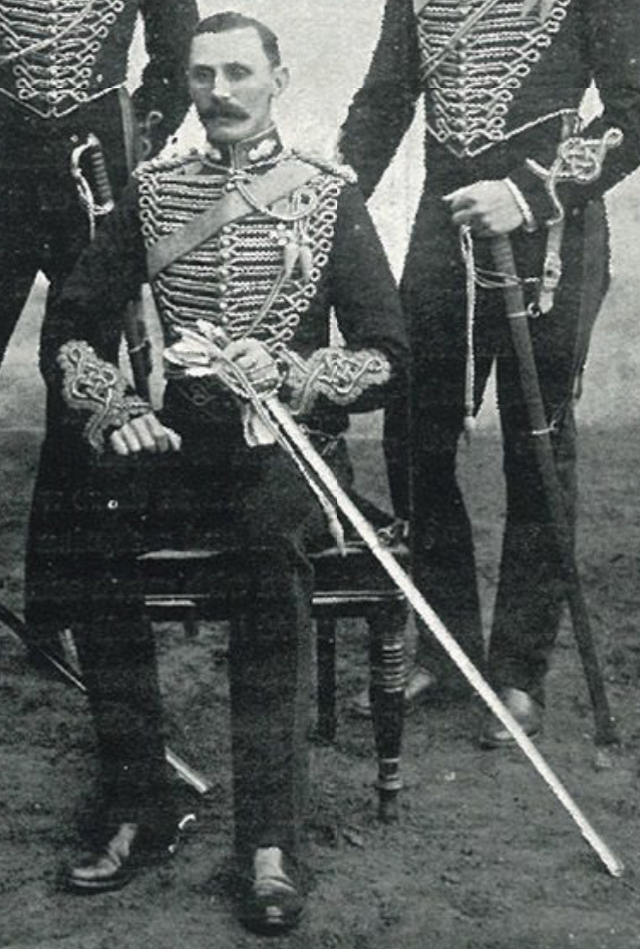
- Born: 11 October 1873; Bath, Somerset, United Kingdom
- Died: 11 July 1920 (aged 46); South Kensington, London
- Spouse: Marjorie Campbell
- Children: Robert Archibald Eden; Joan Agnes Eden
- Military career
- Allegiance: United Kingdom
- Branch: British Army
- Service years: 1893–1920
- Rank: Brigadier-General
- Unit: Royal Artillery
- Conflicts: Second Boer War Relief of Ladysmith; Battle of Vaal Kranz; Battle of the Tugela Heights World War I
- Awards: Distinguished Service Order; Order of St Michael and St George; Legion of Honour (Officier)

Lieutenant Colonel and Temp. Brigadier-general William Rushbrooke Eden CMG DSO (11 October 1873 – 11 July 1920) was a career officer in the British Army. He received his commission in 1893 and actively served until the end of the First World War. He was also the great-great-grandson of Sir Robert Eden, 1st Baronet, of Maryland.

== Early life ==
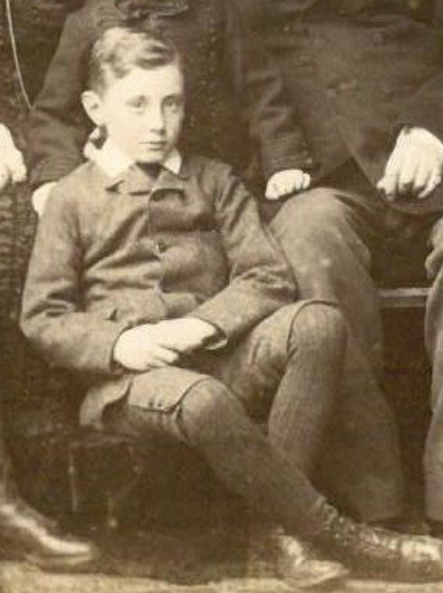
William aged 8, 1882

William was born in Bath on the 11 October 1873 the son of Major Archibald Duffield Eden and his wife Emma Louisa Jarvis, and was the second of three brothers, his older sibling being Colonel (also Brigadier General) Archibald James Fergusson Eden CMG DSO and his younger being Cecil Harold Eden. His grandfather was General William Hassell Eden of the 90th Regiment of Foot. He was educated at Haileybury College.

In 1911 he was married to Marjorie Campbell, with whom he had a son Robert Archibald on the 1 August 1912 and a daughter Joan Agnes on the 27 August 1913.

== Military service ==
William was commissioned from the Royal Military Academy at Woolwich as a Second Lieutenant on 4 March 1893, being promoted to Lieutenant on the 4 March 1896 and Supernumerary Captain on 28 May 1900. The Webley records also document his purchase of a Webley Government revolver in 1893, serial number 5333.

=== Second Boer War ===
William served in the Second Boer War from 1900 with A Battery of the Royal Horse Artillery, being present at the Relief of Ladysmith. He also took part in the Battle of Vaal Kranz, the Battle of the Tugela Heights, and action at Pieter's Hill. From March to June 1900 he was taking part in operations in Natal which included action at Laing's Nek from the 6 of June to 9 of June. He was then taking part in operations in the Transvaal from July to 29 November 1900, which included actions at Belfast on the 26 and 27 of August, and Lydenberg from the 5 to the 8 of September.

An extract from The Times on the 6 August 1900 read as follows: "On July 6, a convoy of supplies for Sir Redvers Buller came through from Greylingstadt. Thorneycroft’s Mounted Infantry with Eden’s section were sent out in the morning to safeguard them.] “ Then followed the most inspiriting incident of the day. A section of the Chestnut Battery under Lieut. Eden was ordered to go forward to engage the gun. They galloped about 1000 yards forward into the open, unlimbered and opened fire. The Boer gun replied and a Vickers-Maxim followed suit. Usually in this way when we enter upon an artillery duel we turn a great many of our guns upon one of the enemy's. This time it was two to two, only the Boers were on a hill and we were in the open below them. It lasted half-an-hour and we were victorious. The Boer guns were silenced, but the Chestnut Battery had not come out unscathed. A man killed, another wounded, six horses wounded, and an ammunition waggon overturned with its wheels smashed were the casualties, and it was wonderful there were not more, for the Boer practice was magnificent; but by far the most magnificent thing was the behaviour of our men under it. Meanwhile, the convoy had got safely home. Thanks to the Chestnut Battery our object had been absolutely achieved.” An officer reports that “ Thorneycroft came over afterwards and told the Major how exceedingly well Eden and our men had done, and that he had sent in a report specially mentioning Eden's coolness and gallantry."

For his service he received the Queen’s South Africa Medal with six clasps and was awarded the Distinguished Service Order “In recognition of services during the operations in South Africa”. He was also Mentioned in Despatches by Field-Marshal Lord Roberts.

=== Early 1900s ===
William was an Adjutant in the Royal Artillery from 15 March 1901 to 23 November 1904. He was promoted to full Captain on 3 July 1905, and in 1907 he was stationed in Egypt as part of U Battery of the Royal Horse Artillery.

He was promoted to Major on 26 February 1910.

=== First World War ===
William was promoted to Temporary Lieutenant Colonel on the 29 August 1915, which was then updated to full Lieutenant Colonel on the 14 November 1915, and then backdated to the 10 November 1915.

He was made Brigadier-General in the Royal Artillery, 27th Division, Salonika Army, on 21 September 1916.

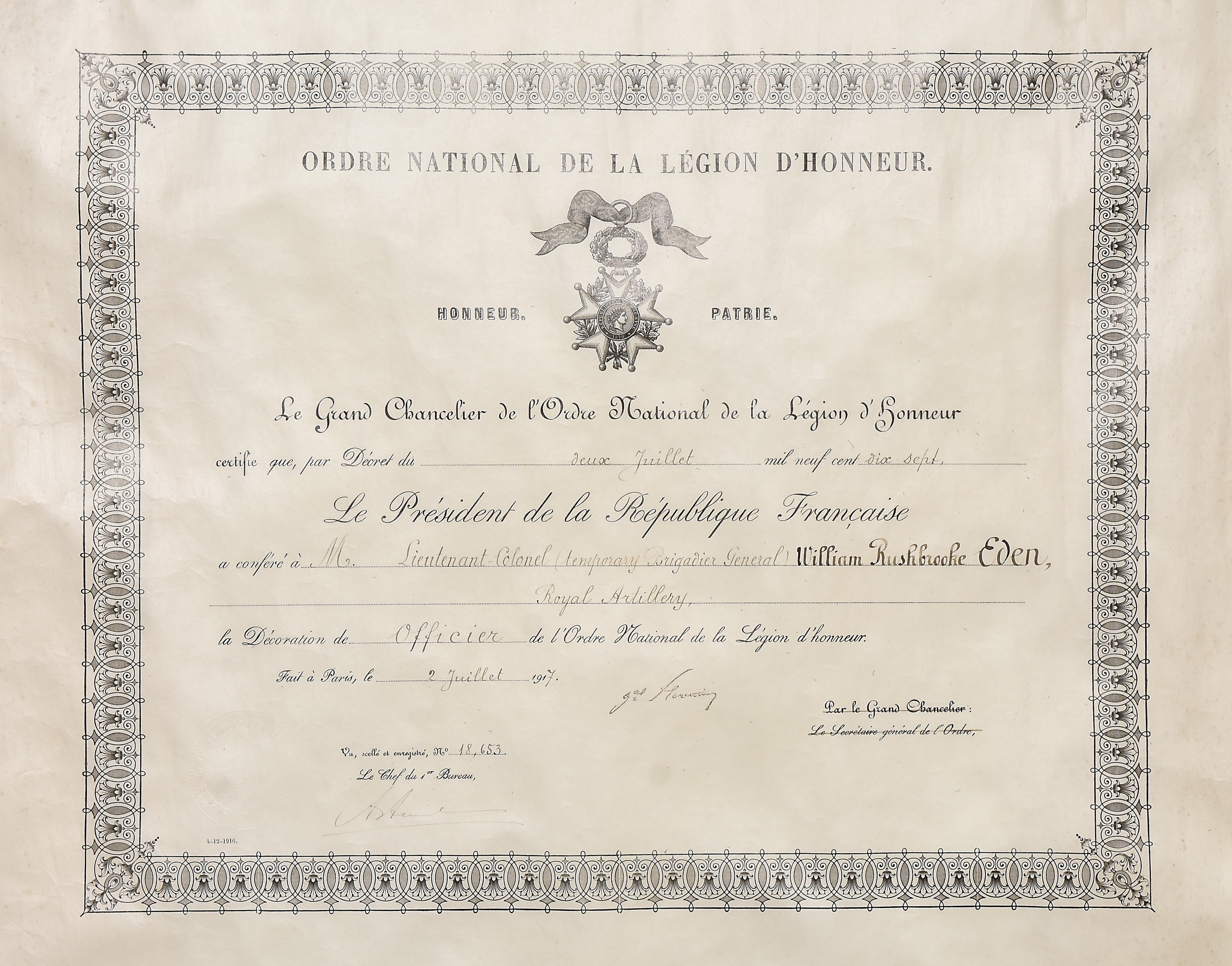
The certificate confirming William’s award of the Legion of Honour

He was made a Companion of the Order of Saint Michael and Saint George on 14 June 1917, and was also awarded the Legion of Honour at the rank of Officier on 1 May 1917.

He was Mentioned in Despatches on 7 January 1916 by Field Marshal French, on the 8 October 1916 by Lieutenant General Milne, 18 July 1917 again by Milne, and 11 June 1918.

He died as a result of testicular cancer combined with the stresses of campaign on 11 July 1920 in South Kensington, having been residing in Woolwich. He is buried in Caversham Cemetery in Berkshire, with his gravestone stating that his cause of death was illness contracted whilst on campaign in Salonika.

Following private investigation and a case submission to the Commonwealth War Graves Commission it was decided at adjudication that he qualified as a war casualty, and as of 9 October 2025 has been recognised as such by the commission.
