= William Hassell Eden =

British Army general (1800–1882)

General William Hassall Eden
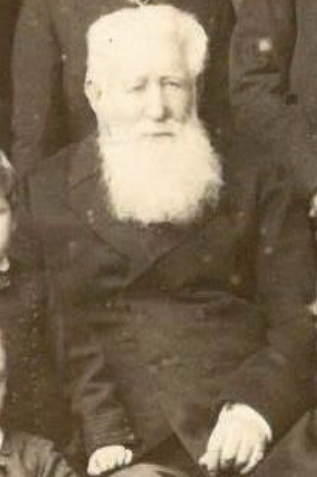
- Eden in 1882
- Born: 22 February 1800
- Died: 10 December 1882 (aged 82); Bath
- Spouse: Frances Georgina Rushbrooke
- Children: Fanny Louisa Eden William Rushbrooke Eden; Harriet Mary Eden; Augusta Frederika Eden; Archibald Duffield Eden Charles Davers Eden
- Military career
- Allegiance: United Kingdom
- Branch: British Army
- Service years: 1814 - 1882
- Rank: General (United Kingdom)
- Units: 6th Regiment of Foot 88th Regiment of Foot; 56th Regiment of Foot 90th Regiment of Foot

General William Hassell Eden (22 February 1800 – 10 December 1882) was a career officer in the British Army, holding the position of Colonel of the 90th Light Infantry from 1862 to 1881. He purchased his commission in 1814 and actively served until his death. He also served as the acting Governor of Bermuda from 1852 to 1853. He was also the grandson of Sir Robert Eden, 1st Baronet, of Maryland.

== Early life ==
Eden was born in 1800 as the illegitimate son of William Thomas Eden and Rose Hassell. He was baptised in the parish of St. Peter in Suffolk, with the register reading "Baptised April 18th William Eden, illegitimate son of Rose Hassell".

== Military service ==
Following his training as a gentleman cadet at the Royal Military College, Sandhurst, Eden was commissioned into the 6th Regiment of Foot on 31 March 1814 as an ensign, serving in France and with the occupying army following Waterloo until 1818.

On 22 June 1820 he purchased the rank of lieutenant, and then the rank of captain on 31 July 1823 and the rank of major on 29 August 1826.

In July 1829 he is listed as coming off the half pay list and back into active service as a major of the 88th Foot.

In August 1839 he was promoted to lieutenant colonel of the 56th Foot.

== Later life ==
He was married to Frances Georgina Rushbrooke in 1832, and they went on to have six children; Fanny Louisa Eden in 1833, William Rushbrooke Eden in 1834, Harriet Mary Eden in 1837, Augusta Frederika Eden in 1839, Archibald Duffield Eden in 1841 and Charles Davers Eden in 1845.

In 1853 his son William Rushbrooke died in a shooting accident, having been hunting rabbits with friends when the thumb of one slipped on the hammer of their gun whilst it was aimed at William R. Eden's leg. The artery was shot through, and he died later that evening. A grandson was later named after him, William Rushbrooke Eden. Fanny Louisa died of yellow fever on September 15 of the same year as well, her husband Captain Edward F. Hare following two days later on September 17, 1853.

He died on 10 December 1882.

== Legacy ==
William's son Archibald and three of his grandchildren went on to become successful officers in the British Army, with another grandson becoming a successful Royal Navy officer and another the Government Commissioner for Egyptian Customs.

The National Portrait Gallery holds a photographic portrait of him, and another photograph that includes him and his wife.
