= Frederick Morton Eden =

English barrister and cricketer (1829–1917)

Frederick Eden
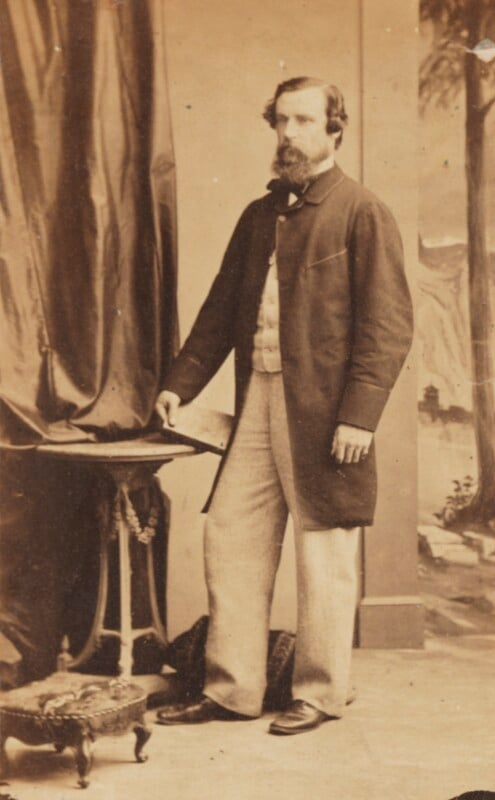
- Eden in the early 1860s

Personal information
- Full name: Frederick Morton Eden
- Born: 1 November 1829; Messing, Essex, England
- Died: 11 March 1917 (aged 87); South Kensington, London, England
- Relatives: Frederick Eden (cousin); Sidney Olivier (nephew)

Domestic team information
- Years: Team
- 1849–1851: Oxford University
- 1852: MCC

Career statistics
Competition	First-class
Matches	9
Runs scored	232
Batting average	17.84
100s/50s	0/3
Top score	51
Balls bowled	?
Wickets	2
Bowling average	?
5 wickets in innings	0
10 wickets in match	0
Best bowling	2/?
Catches/stumpings	4/–
- Source: Cricinfo, 2 March 2020

Frederick Morton Eden (1 November 1829 – 11 March 1917) was an English barrister and first-class cricketer.

The son of the bishop Robert Eden, he was born in November 1829 at Messing, Essex. He was educated at both Rugby School and Eton College, before going up to Christ Church, Oxford where he was a fellow of All Souls College. While studying at Oxford, he played first-class cricket for Oxford University, making his debut against the Marylebone Cricket Club (MCC) at Oxford in 1849. He played first-class cricket for Oxford until 1851, making six appearances. He scored 141 runs for Oxford, at an average of 14.10 and a high score of 51. Eden played first-class cricket twice for the MCC in 1852, before appearing for the Gentlemen of the Marylebone Cricket Club against the Gentlemen of England in 1853.

After graduating from Oxford, Eden was commissioned into the Oxfordshire Militia as a lieutenant in February 1853. He served in Corfu in 1854, before being promoted to captain in August 1856. A student of Lincoln's Inn, Eden was called to the bar in April 1858. He was married twice during his life, with each marriage producing three children each, including Frederick Charles Eden from his first marriage to Louisa Ann Parker. Eden died at South Kensington in March 1917. His cousin Frederick Eden and nephew Sidney Olivier both played first-class cricket.
