= Frederick Charles Eden =

English church architect (1864–1944)

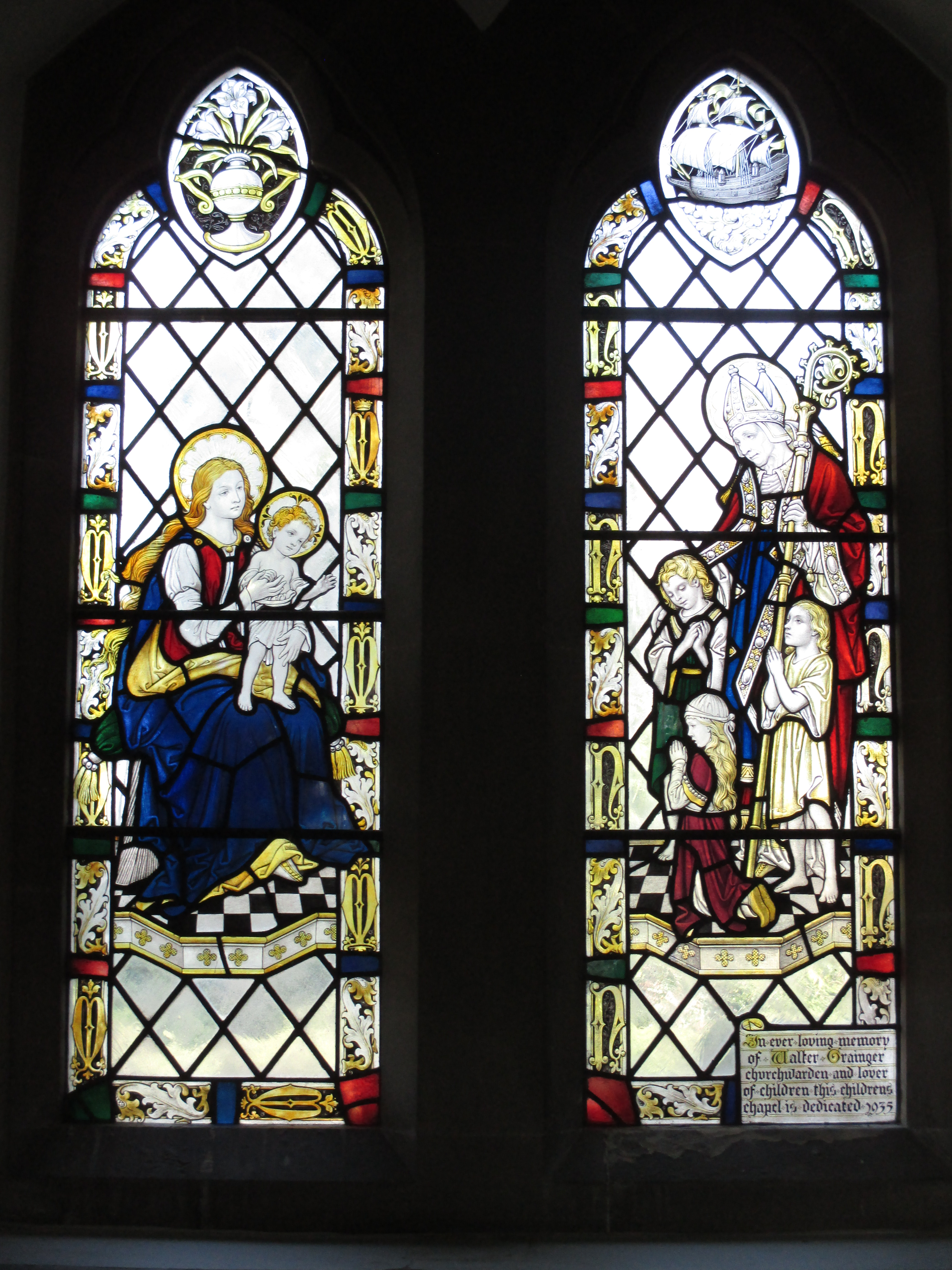
Window in the north transept of St Peter's Church, Henfield, designed by Eden

Frederick Charles Eden (8 March 1864 – 15 July 1944) was an English church architect and designer.

Frederick Eden was born in Brighton, Sussex, England. He was the son of Frederick Morton Eden and Louisa Ann Parker.

Eden was a pupil and later assistant of George Frederick Bodley and Thomas Garner. Subsequently he started his own architectural practice. He increasingly concentrated on designing church fittings and stained glass. In 1908, he remodelled the interior of St Paul's Church in Oxford. In 1910, he established a studio in Red Lion Square, London.

In 1919, Eden designed a Jesse window for the Chapel of Our Lady and St George (Lady Chapel) in St Peter's Collegiate Church, Wolverhampton, replacing a similar one which was there in pre-Reformation times, showing the genealogy of Jesus from Jesse, father of King David. It is a memorial to the worshippers of St Peter's who gave their lives in the First World War.

Eden was a member of the Art Workers Guild. There are drawings by Eden in the collections of the Victoria and Albert Museum.
