= Frederick Eden (cricketer) =

English barrister and cricketer (1829–1916)

Personal information
- Born: 26 June 1829; Wimbledon, Surrey, England
- Died: 5 December 1916 (aged 87); Venice, Kingdom of Italy
- Relatives: Frederick Eden (cousin)

Domestic team information
- Years: Team
- 1850: Oxford University

Frederick Eden (26 June 1829 – 5 December 1916) was an English cricketer and barrister.

The son of Arthur Eden, he was born in June 1829 at Wimbledon. He was educated at Eton College, before going up to Merton College, Oxford. While studying at Oxford, he made a single appearance for Oxford University against the Marylebone Cricket Club at Lord's in 1850. Batting twice in the match, he opened the batting alongside his cousin Frederick Morton Eden, scoring 18 runs in the Oxford first-innings before being dismissed by Jemmy Dean, while in their second-innings he was dismissed for a single run by the same bowler. A student of Lincoln's Inn, he was called to the bar in April 1864. Eden died at Venice in December 1916.
