= Asante Empire =

Former Akan empire centred on present-day Ghana

Coordinates: 5°27′N 0°58′W

Asante Empire Asanteman (Asante Twi)
- 1701–1902
- National emblem

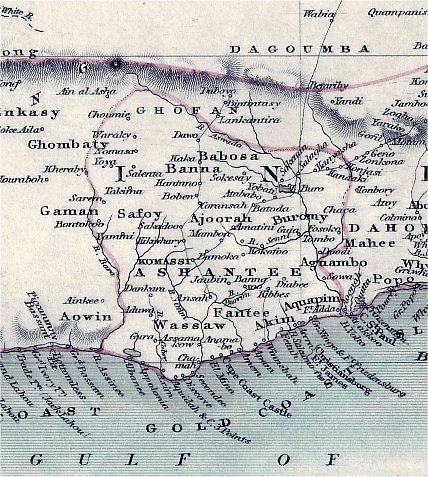
- Map of the Asante Empire
- Status: Empire
- Capital: Kumasi
- Common languages: Asante (Twi) (official), Hausa, Dyula
- Religion: Akan religion
- Demonym: Asantefoɔ
- Government: Constitutional elective monarchy
- Asantehene (King)
  - 1701–1717 (first): Osei Tutu
  - 1888–1896 (13th): Prempeh I
  - 1931–1957 (last): Prempeh II
  - 1999–present (national state within Ghana): Osei Tutu II
- Legislature: Asante Kotoko (Council of Kumasi) and the Asantemanhyiamu (National Assembly)
- History
  - Independence from Denkyira and establishment of the Asante Union: 1701
  - Annexed to form British Ashanti Crown Colony: 1901

Area
- 259,000 km^{2} (100,000 sq mi)

Population
  - 19th century: 3,000,000–4,000,000
- Currency: Gold dust
Preceded by
Adanse
Asantemanso
Akani (Arcania)
Kingdom of Denkyira
Succeeded by
Ashanti Crown Colony
Ghana
- Today part of: Ghana; Ivory Coast; Togo

- People: Asantefoɔ
- Language: Asante Twi
- Country: Asanteman

The Asante Empire (Asante Twi: Asanteman), also known as the Ashanti Empire, was an Akan state that lasted from 1701 to 1902, in what is now modern-day Ghana. It expanded from the Ashanti Region to include most of Ghana and also parts of Ivory Coast and Togo. Due to the empire's military prowess, wealth, architecture, sophisticated hierarchy, trade networks and culture, the Asante Empire has been extensively studied and has more historic records written by European, primarily British, authors than any other indigenous culture of sub-Saharan Africa.

Starting in the late 17th century, the Asante king Osei Tutu (c. 1695 – 1717) and his adviser Okomfo Anokye established the Asante Kingdom, with the Golden Stool of Asante as a sole unifying symbol. Osei Tutu oversaw a massive Asante territorial expansion, building up the army by introducing new organisation and turning a disciplined royal and paramilitary army into an effective fighting machine. In 1701, the Asante army conquered Denkyira, giving the Asante access to the Gulf of Guinea and the Atlantic Ocean coastal trade with Europeans, notably the Dutch. The economy of the Asante Empire was mainly based on the trade of gold and agricultural exports as well as slave trading, craft work and trade with markets further north.

The Asante Empire fought several wars with neighboring kingdoms and lesser organized groups such as the Fante. The Asante held their own against the British in the first two of the five Anglo-Ashanti Wars, killing British army general Sir Charles MacCarthy and keeping his skull as a gold-rimmed drinking cup in 1824. British forces later burnt and sacked the Asante capital of Kumasi, however, and following the final Asante defeat at the fifth Anglo-Ashanti War, the Asante empire became part of the Gold Coast colony on 1 January 1902. Today, the Asante Kingdom survives as a constitutionally protected, sub-national traditional state in union with the Republic of Ghana. The current king of the Asante kingdom is Otumfuo Osei Tutu II. The Asante kingdom is the home to Lake Bosumtwi, Ghana's only natural lake. The state's current economic revenue is derived mainly from trading in gold bars, cocoa, kola nuts and agriculture.

== Etymology ==
=== Meaning of the name Asante ===
Kente cloth, the traditional garment worn by Asante royalty, has been widely adopted throughout the Asante kingdom.

The name Asante means "because of war". The word derives from the Twi words ɔsa meaning "war" and nti meaning "because of". This name comes from the Asante's origin as a kingdom created to fight the Denkyira kingdom.

The variant name "Ashanti" comes from British reports transcribing "Asante" as the British heard it pronounced, as-hanti. The hyphenation was subsequently dropped and the name Ashanti remained, with various spellings including Ashantee common into the early 20th century.

== History ==
=== Amansie and the Five cradles of Akan civilization ===
Akan traditions preserve several types of historical narratives known as adomankomasem (creation stories), atetesem (migration traditions), and abakomsem (histories of political authority). In Asante traditions, Amansie is remembered as the early homeland of the Akan people and means the "Origin of the Nations" or the "Settlement of the Aborigines." The region was associated with the ancestors of the Aduana and Oyoko clans, who are said to have first settled at Asumennya–Santemanso. One tradition recounts how a golden chain descended from the sky carrying a stool and a herald woman, Ankyewea Nyame, the ancestor of the Oyoko lineage, who settled at Asantemanso where other people later emerged from the earth and joined her community. From Amansie, a large portion of the Akan population later migrated to Adanse, where permanent settlements were established and the transition from mobile communities to organized political societies began. Early Akan political organization developed around communities known as aman (states), which were independent political communities governed by ruling lineages. Authority within the communities was symbolized by the akonnwa (stools), which represented the legitimacy of a chief's right to rule. The earliest Akan states in the region between the Pra and Ofin rivers were Adansemanso, Abuakwa Atwumamanso, Asenmanso, Abankeseso, and Asantemanso, collectively known as the Akanman Nnum Piesie ("Five First-Born Akan States").

=== Asantemanso ===
Excavations in Asantemanso, near present-day Essumeja, revealed continuous occupation from at least the 9th century CE, with traces of earlier habitation possibly dating as far back as 700 BCE. Excavations uncovered iron-smelting furnaces, pottery, and the remains of houses. During the first millennium CE, Asantemanso was one of several towns in the forest-savannah areas, alongside Adansemanso, Bima, Begho, Bono Manso, and Ahwene Koko. They were part of a trade network that connected the forest with the Middle Niger Valley through Wangara merchants.. By the 10th century, Asantemanso had grown into a large town with pottery similar to that found in the Birim Valley.

According to Ray Kea, Asantemanso was a proto-urban polity and a "technology of power" in the forest zone. He wrote that it was the center of abirempon that organized gold production, trade, and political authority in the surrounding area. From the 15th century onward, people from Asantemanso moved north and founded Kumase, Dwaben, Kokofu, Kumawu, and nearby towns. As the new towns grew, Asantemanso declined and was no longer the center of Asanteman.

=== Adanse and the formation of Akan states ===
In Akan oral tradition, Adanse is the place where Odomankoma (God) began the creation of the word. It is also associated with the beginnings of Akan kingship and the abusua (clan) system. Adansemanso, the first capital of Adanse, was continuously occupied from the 9th century CE, with earlier settlement dating to 393 CE. Excavations revealed that the town reached its largest size between the 13th and 15th centuries.

According to Osei Tutu Agyeman Prempeh II, the Adanse were the most powerful and advanced of the early Akan groups and were remembered for establishing the first organized kingship in the region. Many southern Akan regarded the region as their ancestral homeland, as well as the origin of many ruling lineages. The Agona of Denkyira originally lived the area stretching from Asokwa west of Obuase and Akrofuom to the meeting of the Oda and Ofin rivers. The Asona, who later founded Ejisu (Edweso), Offinso, and Akyem Abuakwa, traced their ancestry to Kokobiante. The rulers of Assin Atandasu as well as the Asona of Apemanim, the Afutuakwa of Fosu, and the Aboabo of Assin Nyankomase traced their origins to the Pra–Kusa range. The Bretuo of Mampon and Kwahu, the Oyoko of Abadwum and Edubiase, and the Ekouna of Fomena also regard Adanse as the origin point where later lineages migrated from.

From the 16th century onward, several clans moved north and established new towns and states. The Agona were among the first and founded Tafo. They were followed by the Ekoona, Aduana, and Asene, who established Domaa, Amakom, Awima, Kwabre, Suntreso, Asokore, Kwaaman, Kenyase, Kaase, and other settlements. The states took part in trade between the northwestern savannah and the forest.

=== The kingdoms of Arcania and the Accanists ===
References to inland Akan-speaking polities appear in European sources in the early sixteenth century. Duarte Pacheco Pereira, writing between 1505 and 1508, listed the Haccanys among the principal gold-trading groups of in the Gold Coast, alongside the Bremus, Atis, Boroes, and Madinguas. In 1519, the same inland states requested that livestock and other goods be sent to the "King of Assan" in exchange for gold. To secure cooperation from inland traders, Portuguese agents distributed gifts to encourage movement toward coastal markets. One report revealed that 1,550 Martin de Castro sent messengers to Akani, located four days inland from Elmina. Other Portuguese records later referred to envoys and rulers identified as “Kings of Akan,” and by 1548 mentioned internal wars among them. A report of 1572 referred to the kingdom of Asaas and stated that the gold exported from that territory was originally mined at Tafoe (Tafo).

Throughout the sixteenth and seventeenth centuries, the names Accany, Akani, and Arcania appeared in Portuguese, Dutch, and English records. The label referred to inland gold-producing regions north of the coastal states. The region was north of Fante, Agona, and Etsi, west of Kwahu and Akwamu, and south of Bono and Wenchi. It was located in the area between the Ofin, Pra, and Birim river basins. This region was densely populated and associated with gold production and trade. European merchants referred to inland Akan gold traders as Accanists. The traders transported gold and other goods to coastal markets such as Elmina and Kormantine.

Akani merchants supplied a large amount of the gold exported annually by European merchants on the coast. K. Y. Daaku described it as a confederation of Akan polities bound by kinship and trade, centered on Adanse, which he identified as the political and commercial core. J. K. Fynn interpreted it as a centralized kingdom extending across Adanse, south to Assin, east into parts of Akyem, and west toward Denkyira. Ray Kea instead believed it as a trading society organized around merchant groups that controlled inland gold routes.

=== The fall of Adanse and the fragmentation of the Akan heartland ===
The breakup of the Akan heartland resulted from succession disputes, competition over trade, and struggles for political control among leading clans. Akyem Abuakwa traditions trace the crisis to the death of Awurade Basa, king of Adansemanso and creator of the Afenakwa sword, a symbol of centralized authority. As wealth became concentrated in Assin and Denkyira, conflicts over tolls, markets, and caravan routes undermined the confederation. The weakening of Adanse’s political unity led to the movement of several Akan people lineages. Some, including the Asona clan, who crossed east of the Pra, while others, among them the ancestors of the Asante, moved north from the Amansie to the Kumasi area. After 1629, the movements intensified with the military campaigns of the Denkyira. Under Werempe-Ampem, Denkyira expanded through military force and control of the gold trade, absorbing many Akan territories and disrupting established trade networks.

By the mid-seventeenth century, the introduction of firearms altered the balance of power in the interior. The Portuguese and Dutch were officially restricted from selling guns, increasing European competition after the 1650s led to greater availability of firearms on the coast. Dutch officials reported growing demand for guns on the Gold Coast by 1658. During this period, Adanse was defeated and Denkyira rose to become the dominant power in the Pra-Ofin basin. After the victory Denkyira became the leading power in the Gold Coast hinterland and extended its authority over neighboring regions.

=== Migrations from Akan heartland and the rise of the Oyoko states ===
Members of the Oyoko and Ekoona clans migrated north from Adanse and Amansie to avoid Denkyira’s domination. They settled in new areas where they could control land and trade with less interference. Oti Akenten was credited with leading the movement of the Oyoko clan from Asantemanso to Kokofu to Kwaman. During his leadership, the Oyoko became stronger than the Ekoona headmen who had previously held authority in the area. At the time of the migration, the forest region was already full of well established Akan states like Kaase, Tafo, Amakom and others. The Kwaman area was bordered to the north and north-east by the Guan state of Atara Frinam, and to the north-west by the Bono kingdom. It was located near Tafo, which was an inland trading center on the north–west route. The location allowed the polity to take part in and influence regional trade. The Adanse-Amansie migrants competed for land and control of trade routes which contributed to closer political coordination among them.

The Oyoko settled at Nsuta, Juaben, Kokofu, Bekwai, and Kumasi, creating a group of towns within about thirty miles of present-day Kumasi. The concentration of settlements later formed the territorial nucleus of the Asante Union. From this base, the Oyoko leadership began consolidating surrounding settlements into a loose confederation.

=== Political conflicts before the rise of Asante ===
By the late seventeenth century the interior of the Gold Coast was dominated by three major Akan states: Denkyira, Akyem, and Akwamu. Their control of gold production and inland trade routes made them the principal powers of the region. After numerous military campaigns, Denkyira controlled several gold-producing regions like Aowin, Gwira, Wassa, Twifo, Adanse, and Asante, monopolizing the gold resources of the upper Tano, Ankobra, Ofin, and Pra river systems. Rivalry among Denkyira, Akyem, and Akwamu contributed to political instability in the hinterland as the states competed for control of gold production, kola trade, and the inland routes linking the forest states with the coast. The Denkyirahene Boamponsem required the ruler of Kwaman to pay an annual tribute of gold and palm oil and to send a member of the royal family to reside at the Denkyira court. In response, the Kumase ruler Oti Akenten sent his nephew Osei Tutu, who remained for a period at the Denkyira capital accompanied by several attendants, including the future Asante military leader Amankwatia.

After this period Osei Tutu sought refuge at the court of the Akwamuhene Nana Ansa Sasraku I while avoiding Denkyira authority. Akwamu later supported Osei Tutu during the formation of the Asante Union in an effort to counterbalance the Denkyira–Akyem alliance and weaken their influence in the interior. At Akwamu he became associated with Okomfo Anokye, the future cofounder of the Asante Empire. After returning to Kumase, relations with Denkyira deteriorated and tensions intensified between the two states.

=== The foundation of Asante ===
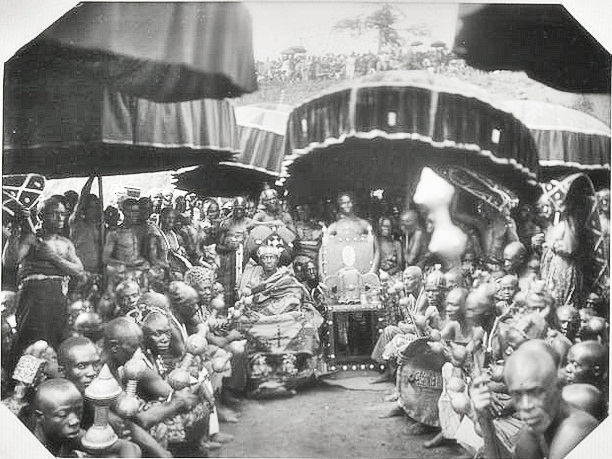
Golden Stool (Sika dwa) in the Asante Kingdom, 1935.

Around 1680, leadership of the growing Asante union passed to Nana Obiri Yeboa, who continued the process of political consolidation. His death in battle with the Dormaa led to the rise of Osei Tutu I.At this time, the Asante states were subject to Denkyira. The Denkyirahene Ntim Gyakari demanded heavy tribute. When the Asante refused, war broke out around 1698. According to Asante tradition, the leaders of Nsuta, Mampong, Dwaben, Bekwai, and Kokofu met before the final break with Denkyira. During this period, the Golden Stool (Sika dwa) became the central symbol of unity under Osei Tutu I.

The stool remains sacred and is believed to contain the Sunsum of the Asante people. In 1701, Osei Tutu and Okomfo Anokye led a coalition of Asante states against Denkyira and defeated them at the Battle of Feyiase. The victory ended Denkyira’s control over the Asante states. After the war, the allied rulers recognized Kumasi as the center of the union and Osei Tutu as Asantehene.

=== Dutch relations and consolidation of Power ===
After gaining independence from Denkyira in 1701, Asante emerged as the dominant inland power. With Denkyira removed as the intermediary between the interior states and the European forts on the coast, the inland trade from Anomabo in the east to Axim in the west began to shift toward Kumasi. European merchants and officials who had previously dealt with Denkyira redirected their attention to the Asante court, which soon began receiving delegations from the English, Dutch, and Danish companies seeking commercial and diplomatic relations with the Asante. The Dutch attempted to secure their position by sending David van Nyendael to Kumasi. Nyendael became the first European to reach the Asante capital and served as the first European consul at the court of the Asante kings. He remained in Kumasi for more than a year to strengthen Dutch influence in the interior trade network. The English attempted to challenge Dutch influence at Kumasi. After the loss of coastal influence to the Dutch, English representatives tried to win the favor of the Asante state and promote English commercial interests when Sir Dalby Thomas served as Agent-General at Cape Coast between 1707 and 1711.

Despite the victory over Denkyira in 1701, the inland region remained unstable. The defeat of Denkyira opened the route from the interior to the coast, but many of the states that had previously been under Denkyira, including Wassa, Twifo, Sefwi, Aowin, and Assin, had supported Asante during the war in the hope of regaining independence. Conflict developed when Asante attempted to extend authority over the same territories. In the years immediately after the fall of Denkyira, Asante conducted campaigns in several directions to secure control over the interior and the routes linking the interior with the coast. These conflicts included both punitive wars intended to demonstrate Asante power and wars aimed at securing control of trade routes and important sources of commodities. In 1702 a combined Akyem and Denkyira force defeated Asante. Akyem remained hostile to Kumasi and provided refuge for opponents of Asante authority. In 1706 Asante forces under Amankwa Tia, the first Kontihene of Kumasi, joined Wassa in a campaign against Denkyira. Denkyira was defeated again and reduced to tributary status. One of the states on the western route that had long opposed Asante was Domaa. In an early encounter at Suntresu, near Kumasi, the Domaas were driven from their settlement. A later conflict proved fatal for Obiri Yeboa, the predecessor of Osei Tutu. Osei Tutu later avenged this defeat, although resistance from Domaa continued.

=== The fall of Wenchi and war with Aowin ===
After suppressing Denkyira resistance, Asante turned its attention to the west in order to secure control of the trade routes linking the forest states with the northern markets and the coast. Wenchi and neighboring states occupied important positions along routes leading toward Nsoko (Begho). Ahwene Koko was the capital of the Wenchi state and became a target during these campaigns. According to Wenchi traditions, Osei Tutu attacked Ahwene Koko in order to obtain the “precious Ahenedwa (red bead stool)” of the Wenchi ruler. Wenchi was a wealthy trading state and the polity benefited from access to kola and alluvial gold and was also known for its cloth industry. A Dutch map of 1629 described Wenchi as producing “artistically beautiful cloths which the inhabitants sell to the Akani.” In October 1715, Dutch records from Axim reported that an Asante army of about 3,000 men had attacked an inland town identified as “Affindie Cocco.” The stool was never recovered after the destruction of the town and was said to have been buried near the junction of the Tano and Trome rivers. After the destruction of Ahwene Koko, the Wenchi chief Dinckra took refuge in Aowin with about three hundred Asante soldiers who had accompanied him during the campaign. Dutch officials at Axim reported that their presence in Aowin was expected to give an “immediate cause for war.”

Between 1712 and 1715 Asante and Wassa turned against Twifo. Twifo was defeated, made tributary, and its ruler was removed and replaced. By 1714 Asante had defeated most of the states that had previously acknowledged Denkyira authority but Aowin continued to resist Asante control. Preparations for war were reported early in 1715, with both Asante and Aowin beginning to collect firearms and ammunition. Traders returning from the interior reported that Aowin rulers were purchasing large quantities of “powder and guns.” The rulers restricted the movement of traders leaving the state so that news of the preparations would not reach Kumasi. Between April and September 1715 Asante forces moved through Wassa and advanced toward Aowin. Twifo chiefs from Intwan and Ajepa supported the campaign, and later in the year Akan forces from Akyem under Amankwatia joined the army. Early reports suggested that Asante forces had been repelled, but by December the Aowin army was described as “on the run to the windward coast.” The campaign ended with the defeat of Aowin and the imposition of a fine of about £2,000 and several slaves.

After the defeat of Aowin, Amankwatia led Asante forces toward the coast. The army moved through Abocroe, Ankobra, Nzima, and Igwira, compelling the inhabitants to pay tribute and provide supplies for Aowin refugees. Reports in December 1715 stated that “the Asantes had ruined Cape Apollonia,” and that Asante miners were carrying gold from the interior to the coast. The advance of the Asante army threw the windward coast from Sekondi to Cape Palmas into confusion, and several coastal states sought protection from the Dutch against possible further attacks. After the campaigns in the western interior, Asante soon faced renewed conflict with Akyem to the east.

=== First War with Akyem and Internal Crisis ===
Tensions with Akyem continued because Akyem had supported Denkyira and remained opposed to Asante expansion. In 1717, war broke out between the two states, and the Asante were defeated on the Pra. During the fighting, Osei Tutu I was killed, and soon afterward the experienced war leader Amankwa Tia also died. Reports from the coast in 1718 described Asante as divided and in confusion. The unity achieved after 1701 was weakened, and neighboring states began to reassess their position. While Asante forces were engaged in war with Akyem, the Aowin marched into Kumasi and sacked the capital. According to the Dutch factor at Axim, the Aowin army numbered about 9,000 and returned with considerable booty, including 20.000 Asante women and children, and they carried away “much gold and conte de Terra [Aggrey beads].”

In April 1718, the Wassa, the Denkyira and the Twifo requested “the Akim caboceer Affory to come to them and then jointly attack the Assjantynse in their own country,” and reports indicated that the Aowin and the Wassa were preparing themselves “with powder and guns.” Dutch correspondence suggested that the defeat of the Asante had been linked to the conduct of the Akwamu, as Akonno, the Akwamuhene, allegedly advised the Asante to pass through Akwamu territory and then informed the Akyem of their route. The Asante troops were surrounded, deprived of food, and smallpox broke out before the Akyem launched a decisive attack. Faced with revolt and isolation, the Asante sought accommodation with Akyem in 1718, and a Dutch report stated that both had realised they had been “so miserably and knavishly duped by the Aquamboes.” After recognising the strategic cost of continued conflict, both states chose to stabilize their relations and redirect their attention to other regional challenges. After 1720, Asante and Akyem remained at peace.

=== War against Aowin, Nzima, Wassa, Bono, Gyaman, Gonja, Krakye and Dagomba ===
In 1721 and 1722, Asante decided to attack Aowin, Nzima and Wassa in order to secure the western trade routes. During the campaigns, the Asante fought many battles against Aowin and Nzima, which ended in their total defeat. The Dutch reported that “the gold rich Awinse suffered its greatest defeat,” and that large numbers of Aowin prisoners were sold as slaves at Elmina, Cape Coast and Anomabo. John Atkins, a British naval officer on the Nzima coast at the time, recorded that he personally met the Queen of Nzima and her followers who had fled their country at Assini. After defeating Aowin and Nzima, the Asante intended to extend the campaign into Wassa territory, but hostilities were temporarily halted because Tekyiman threatened an invasion of Asante. In 1722, Bono was conquered by subterfuge using Bafo Pim and the Nkoronzas. Afterward, Nkoranza became a base for further expansion to the north and north-west. From Nkoranza, Asante forces later moved into Banda, eastern Gonja and Krakyè and defeated Dagomba.

By 1726, Asante was ready to deal with Wassa, now ruled by Intsiful Asare. In January of that year it was reported that “the king of Asjantijn is marching against the Wassaws.” In a series of severe contests, Wassa resistance was overcome and the Wassa king retired to Pepesia to assemble his people. Intsiful sent envoys to Fort Hollandia at Butri asking that his “wives and slave women” be admitted into the Dutch fort for protection. The English instead granted him protection at Dixcove and told him that if he were attacked by Tokoe and the Asante he should go to Cabo Corso (Cape Coast), promising that the Fante would march to assist him. On the same day, a large canoe passed laden with muskets and other goods for Dixcove to supply Intsiful. Ahanta troops led by John Konny, supported by an Asante contingent, attacked the Wassa at Dixcove. The Wassa king escaped with about 1,500 followers to Toho and then to Quasje Mintim, intending to go to Sekondi. He was later allowed to pitch his camp in Abrem territory, where he prepared to receive the Asante army.

On 4 May 1726, an Asante chief, Adjei Twum, informed the Dutch at Shama that permission was being sought from the Asantehene to wage war on both Wassa and Fante. Soon afterward, it was disclosed that Opoku Ware had sent reinforcements totalling 50,000 men under Alane (Anane), described as a brother of “Saijtoe (Osei Tutu) the deceased king of Ashantee,” and caboceer Aprecoe (Apraku). These forces included contingents from Takyiman, Aowin and Twifo. Because the Fante were determined to protect the Wassa king and the Dutch suspected English support for Wassa and Fante, the Dutch Director-General Pieter Valckenier ordered that the Asante be supplied with arms and gunpowder. With this support, Asante forces entered Abrem and burned several towns and villages. However, since they could not fight the combined forces of Wassa and Fante supported by the English, the Asante army withdrew to Twifo.

Gyaman was conquered because of its gold fields and trade. A tribute of 18,000 ounces of gold dust per annum was imposed, and the gold trade was diverted to Kumasi away from the north-west and the north. Conflict with Wassa continued. In 1729, Ntsiful attacked “the country of Cuifferoe which is the key of Ashantee and the path by which trade is brought to the waterside.” He sold sixty war prisoners to the English and prohibited trade with the Dutch “against whome (sic) he is very much incensed.” Opoku Ware responded by sending 10,000 troops. The Wassa were defeated, and the Dutch Director General reported that “at last the Asjantijn ... have defeated the notorious king of Warsaw, Intuffer, his whole country is ruined.” Intsiful was not eliminated, he depopulated his country, moved toward the Fante and Ahanta borders, and founded a new Wassa state called Fiase. From there he occupied “certain impregnable passages” and blocked inland traders from reaching the west coast. He also entered into an offensive and defensive alliance with “the kings and chiefs of all the coastal states from Cape Appolonia to the Rio Volta” to prevent guns and gunpowder from reaching Asante.

=== Second war with Akyem ===
While Asante was consolidating its position in other regions, Akyem expanded rapidly. In 1730, Akyem defeated Akwamu and expelled them across the Volta to establish their capital at Akwamufie. Akyem Kotoku gained control over several Akwamu towns, while much of western Akwamu fell to Akyem Abuakwa, and the latter created the state of Akuapem where Ofori Dua was enstooled Omanhene. The rapid expansion of Akyem power alarmed Kumasi, and in 1742 war broke out again between Asante and Akyem. After several engagements, the Asante emerged victorious and Apau, Ba Kwante, and Owusu Akyem Tenten were killed. Following the victory, the Asantehene received the ground rents for the European settlements at Accra. In May 1742 the Danes began to pay “thirty-two rigsdaler for his overlordship [overherskab] and for the sake of trade from himself and his subjects, in addition to an annual expensive present,” and in 1757 the British paid “Cuishee Kwasi Obodum, king of Ashantee his ground rent at £8 per month from 15 January, 1756–15 January, 1757 in trade goods.”

=== Northern Consolidation ===
In the 1750s, the Fante controlled the coast from the Pra River to the borders of the Ga kingdom. In 1766, they executed a messenger who attempted to smuggle “a quarter barrel of gun powder.” Dagomba was conquered in the early 1770s and paid tribute of 500 slaves, 200 cattle, 400 sheep, 400 cotton cloths and 200 silk cloths annually. In 1778 and 1789 reports stated that the Fante would not allow the Ashantees to come down through their country.

In the early 1780s, the “Duncoes” revolted and in several engagements “had the advantage over the Ashantees.” In the early 1790s, Osei Kwame considered sending 10,000 troops to the lower Volta area, but the army was not sent largely because of Anglo-Dutch opposition.

=== Reign of Osei Bonsu and War with the Fante ===
In 1806, Asante forces pursued two rebel leaders through Fante territory to the coast. The British refusal to surrender the rebels led to an Asante attack. In 1807, disputes led to the Ashanti–Fante War. In 1811, during the Ga–Fante War, Asante defeated an alliance of Fante, Akwapim and Akim states. By 1816, Asante had absorbed the Fante Confederacy. After the revolt of Adinkira in 1818, Asante tightened control over Gyaman. Troops were stationed at Amanaha on the Assin river, and roads were built between Kumasi and Bontuku, and from Kintampo through Buipe to Jenne and Segu.

=== Ashanti–Akim–Akwapim War ===
In 1814 the Asante launched an invasion of the Gold Coast, largely to gain access to European traders. In the Ashanti–Akim–Akwapim War, the empire faced the Akim–Akwapim alliance. After several battles, the out numbered Akim–Akwapim alliance were defeated and became tributories to the Asantes. The Asante was established from the midlands down to the coast.

=== Relations with the British ===
On May 15, 1817, the Englishman Thomas Bowdich entered Kumasi. He remained there for several months, was impressed, and on his return to England wrote a book, Mission from Cape Coast Castle to Ashantee. His praise of the kingdom was disbelieved as it contradicted prevailing prejudices. Joseph Dupuis, the first British consul in Kumasi, arrived on March 23, 1820. Both Bowdich and Dupuis secured a treaty with the Asantehene, but the governor, Hope Smith, did not meet Ashanti expectations.

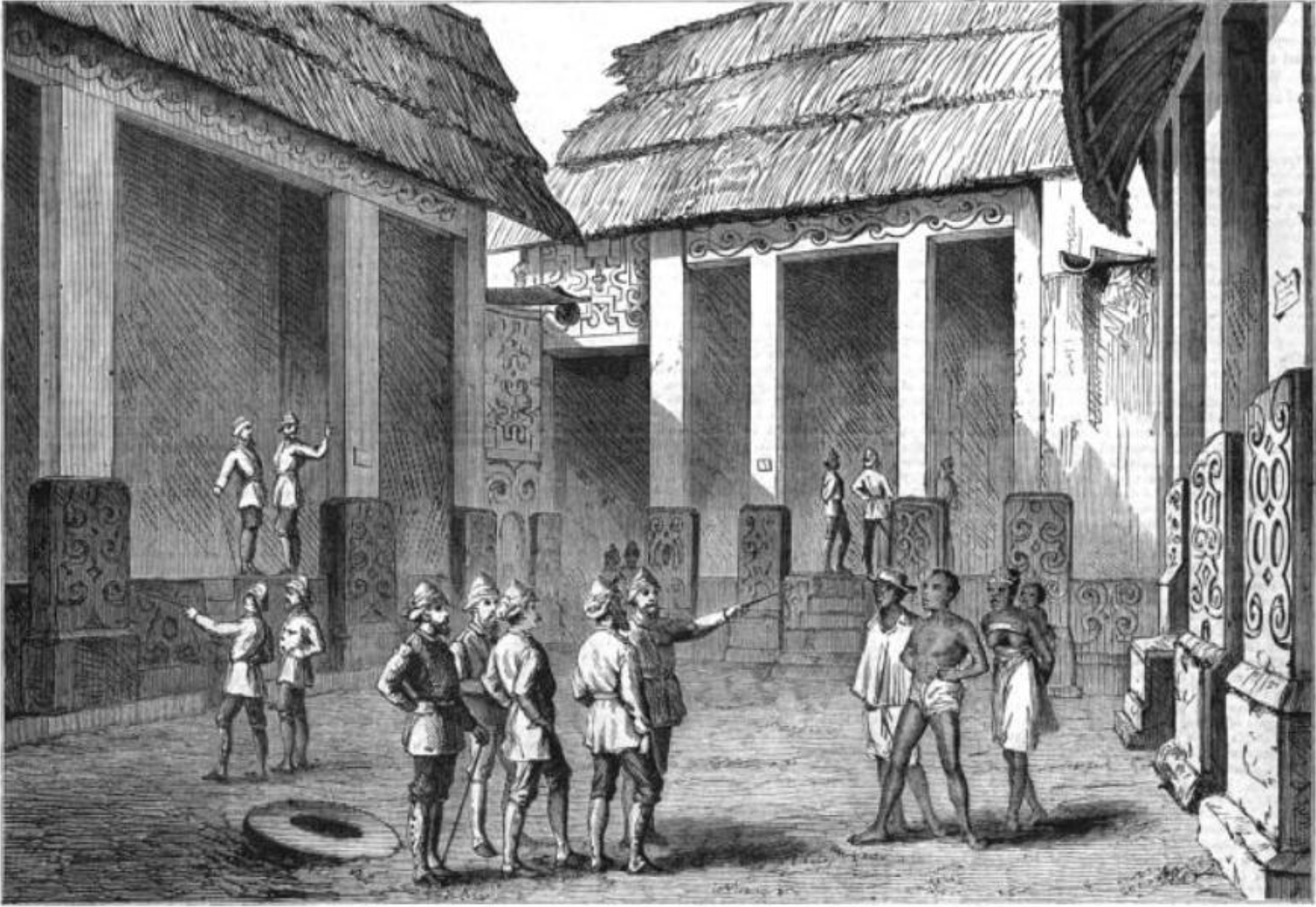
English officers selecting quarters in the chief's palace at Fomena.

From 1824 till 1899 there were five Anglo-Ashanti wars between the Asante Empire and Great Britain and its allies. The wars were mainly due to Asante attempts to establish a stronghold over the coastal areas of present-day Ghana. Coastal peoples such as the Fante and the Ga came to rely on British protection against Asante incursions.

==== First Anglo-Ashanti War ====
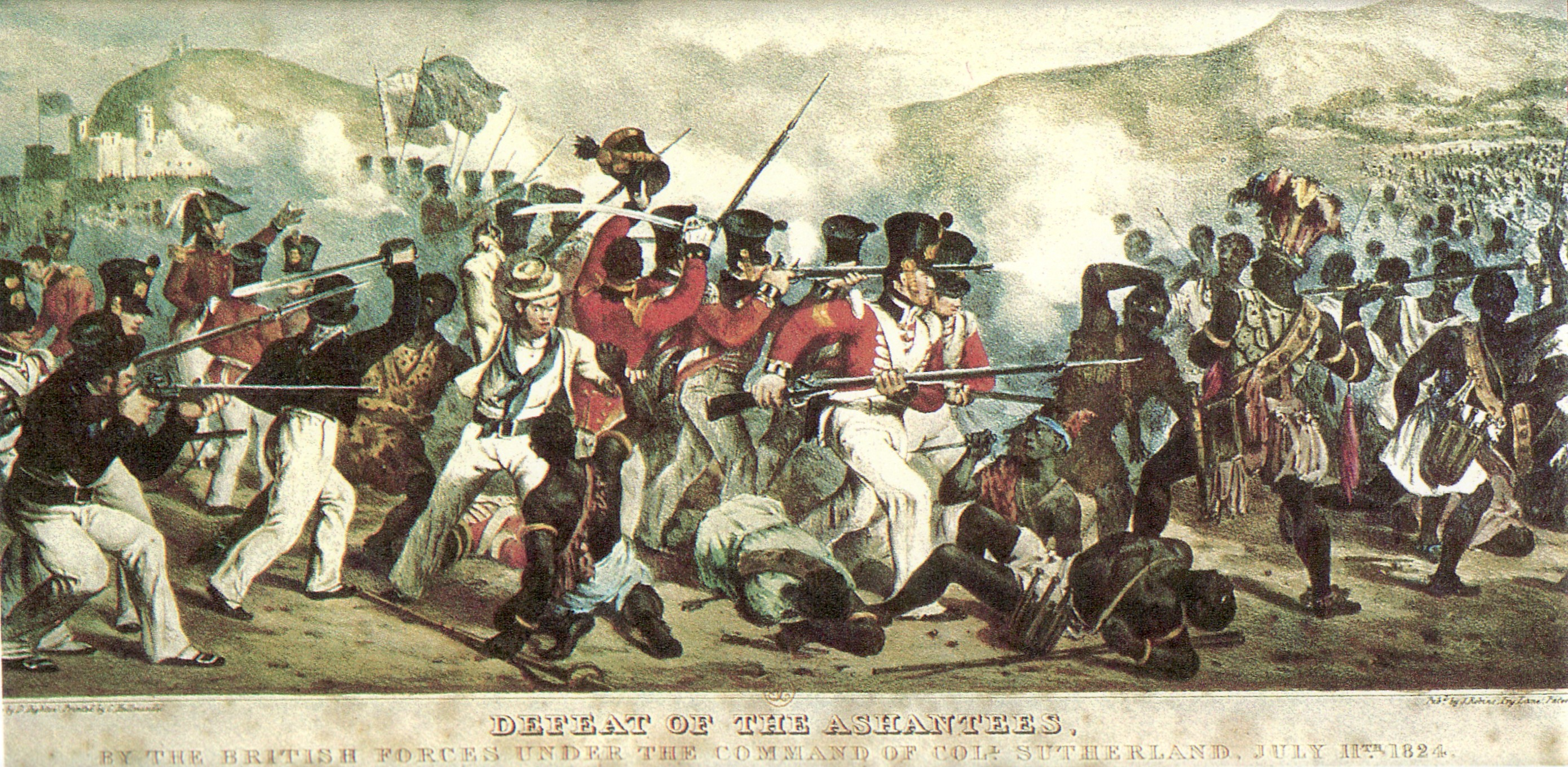
The Asante army engaged with British forces under the command of Col. Sutherland, July 11, 1824

The first of the Anglo-Ashanti wars occurred in 1823. In these conflicts, the Asante empire faced off, with varying degrees of success, against the British Empire residing on the coast. The root of the conflict traces back to 1823 when Sir Charles MacCarthy, resisting all overtures by the Asante to negotiate, led an invading force. The Asante defeated this, killed MacCarthy, took his head for a trophy and swept on to the coast. However, disease forced them back. The Asante were so successful in subsequent fighting that in 1826 they again moved on the coast.

The Asante were stopped about 15 kilometres (10 mi) north of Accra by a British led force. They fought against superior numbers of British allied forces, including Denkyirans until the novelty of British rockets caused the Asante army to flee. In 1831, a treaty led to 30 years of peace, with the Pra River accepted as the border.

==== Second Anglo-Ashanti War ====
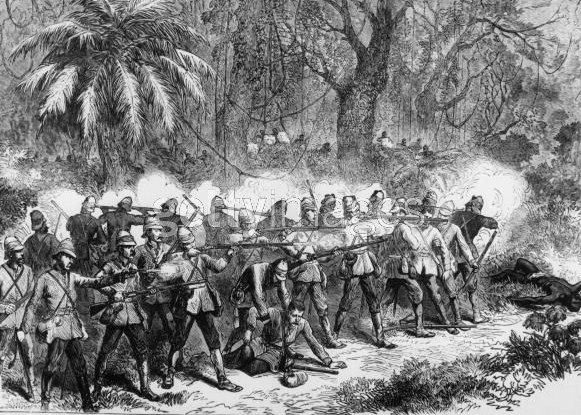
An Asante force engaged with the British 42nd Highlanders; The Graphic.

With the exception of a few Asante light skirmishes across the Pra in 1853 and 1854, the peace between the Asante and British Empire had remained unbroken for over 30 years. Then, in 1863, a large Asante delegation crossed the river pursuing a fugitive, Kwesi Gyana. There was fighting, casualties on both sides, but the governor's request for troops from England was declined and sickness forced the withdrawal of his West Indian troops. The war ended in 1864 as a stalemate with both sides losing more men to sickness than any other factor.

==== Third Anglo-Ashanti War ====
In 1869 a European missionary family was taken to Kumasi. They were hospitably welcomed and were used as an excuse for war in 1873. Also, Britain took control of Asante land claimed by the Dutch. The Asante invaded the new British protectorate. General Wolseley and his famous Wolseley ring were sent against the Asante. This was a modern war, replete with press coverage (including by the renowned reporter Henry Morton Stanley) and printed precise military and medical instructions to the troops. The British government refused appeals to interfere with British armaments manufacturers who were unrestrained in selling to both sides.

All Asante attempts at negotiations were disregarded. Wolseley took 2,500 British troops and several thousand West Indian and African troops to Kumasi. It arrived in Kumasi in January 1896 along a route cleared by an advance contingent under the command of Robert Baden-Powell. The capital was briefly occupied. The British were impressed by the size of the palace and the scope of its contents, including "rows of books in many languages." The Asante had abandoned the capital after a bloody war. The British burned it.

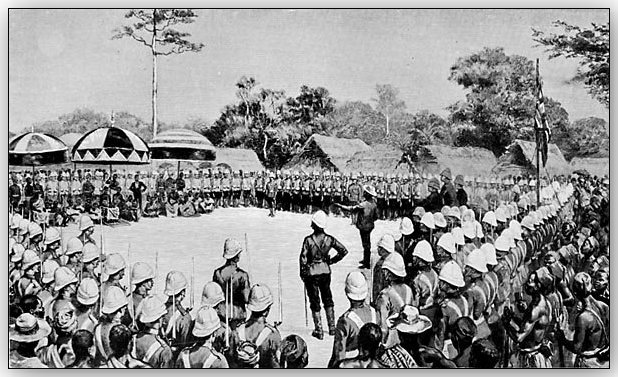
In January 1896, the British formally annexed the Asante empire to the British Empire.

The British and their allies suffered considerable casualties in the war losing numerous soldiers and high ranking army officers, but in the end the firepower was too much to overcome for the Asante. The Asantehene (the king of the Asante) signed a British treaty in July 1874 to end the war.

==== Fourth Anglo-Ashanti War ====
In 1895, the Asante turned down an unofficial offer to become a British protectorate.

The Asante wanting to keep French and European colonial forces out of the territory (and its gold), the British were anxious to conquer Asante Empire once and for all. Despite being in talks with the state about making it a British protectorate, Britain began the Fourth Anglo-Ashanti War in 1895 on the pretext of failure to pay the fines levied on the Asante monarch after the 1874 war. In December 1895, the British left Cape Coast with an expeditionary force to start what is known as the Fourth Anglo-Ashanti War. The Asantehene directed the Asante to not resist the British advance, as he feared reprisals from Britain if the expedition turned violent. Shortly thereafter, Governor William Maxwell arrived in Kumasi as well, where Prempeh I was humiliated.

Britain annexed the territories of the Asante and the Fanti and constituted the Ashanti Crown Colony on 26 September 1901. Asantehene Agyeman Prempeh was deposed and arrested, and he and other Asante leaders were sent into exile in the Seychelles. The Asante Union was dissolved. A British Resident was permanently placed in the city of Kumasi, and soon after a British fort was built there.

=== 20th Century ===
As a final measure of resistance, the remaining Asante court not exiled to the Seychelles mounted an offensive against the British Residents at the Kumasi Fort. The resistance was led by Asante queen Yaa Asantewaa, Queen-Mother of Ejisu. From March 28 to late September 1900, the Asante and British were engaged in what would become known as the War of the Golden Stool (Fifth Anglo-Ashanti War). In the end, the British were victorious; they exiled Asantewaa and other Asante leaders to the Seychelles to join Asante King Prempeh I.

In 1935, the British restored the Asante Confederacy under British colonial rule, allowing the Asantehene to govern Asante's internal affairs, though the region remained under British control. Upon Ghana's independence in 1957, the Asante Kingdom became part of the new nation. While the Asantehene's traditional authority was restored, the Asante Kingdom was integrated into Ghana, rather than entering a formal political union.

== Government and politics ==
The Asante state was a centralized state made up of a hierarchy of heads starting from the "Abusua Panyin" who was head of a family or lineage. The family was the basic political unit in the empire. The family or lineage followed the village organization which was headed by the Odikro. All villages were then grouped together to form divisions headed by a divisional head called Ohene. The various divisions were politically grouped to form a state which was headed by an Omanhene or Amanhene. Finally, all Asante states formed the Asante Empire with the Asantehene as their king.

The Asante government was built upon a sophisticated bureaucracy in Kumasi, with separate ministries to handle the state's affairs. Of particular note was Asante's Foreign Office based in Kumasi; despite its small size, it allowed the state to pursue complex negotiations with foreign powers. The Office was divided into departments to handle relations separately with the British, French, Dutch, and Arabs. Scholars of Ashanti history, such as Larry Yarak and Ivor Wilks, disagree over the power of this sophisticated bureaucracy in comparison to the Asantehene, but agree that it was a sign of a highly developed government with a complex system of checks and balances.

=== Administration ===
==== Asantehene ====
At the top of Asante's power structure sat the Asantehene, the King of Asante. Each Asantahene was enthroned on the sacred Golden Stool, the Sika 'dwa, an object that came to symbolise the very power of the King. Osei Kwadwo (r. 1764–1777) began the meritocratic system of appointing central officials according to their ability, rather than their birth.

As King, the Asantehene held immense power in Asante, but did not enjoy absolute royal rule. He was obliged to share considerable legislative and executive powers with Asante's sophisticated bureaucracy. But the Asantehene was the only person in Asante permitted to invoke the death sentence in cases of crime. During wartime, the King acted as Supreme Commander of the Asante army, although during the 19th century, the fighting was increasingly handled by the Ministry of War in Kumasi. Each member of the confederacy was also obliged to send annual tribute to Kumasi.

The Asantehene (King of all Asante) reigned over all and was King of the division of Kumasi, the nation's capital, and the Asante Empire. He was elected in the same manner as all other chiefs. In this hierarchical structure, every chief or King swore fealty to the one above him—from village and subdivision, to division, to the chief of Kumasi, and finally the Asantehene swore fealty to the State.

The elders circumscribed the power of the Asantehene, and the chiefs of other divisions considerably checked the power of the King. This in practical effect created a system of checks and balances. As the symbol of the nation, the Asantehene received significant deference ritually, for the context was religious in that he was a symbol of the people in the flesh: the living, dead or yet to be born. When the king committed an act not approved of by the counsel of elders or the people, he could possibly be impeached, and demoted to a commoner.

The existence of aristocratic organizations and the council of elders is evidence of an oligarchic tendency in Asante political life. These men tended to monopolize political power around themselves into both "war" parties and "peace" parties.

==== Residence ====
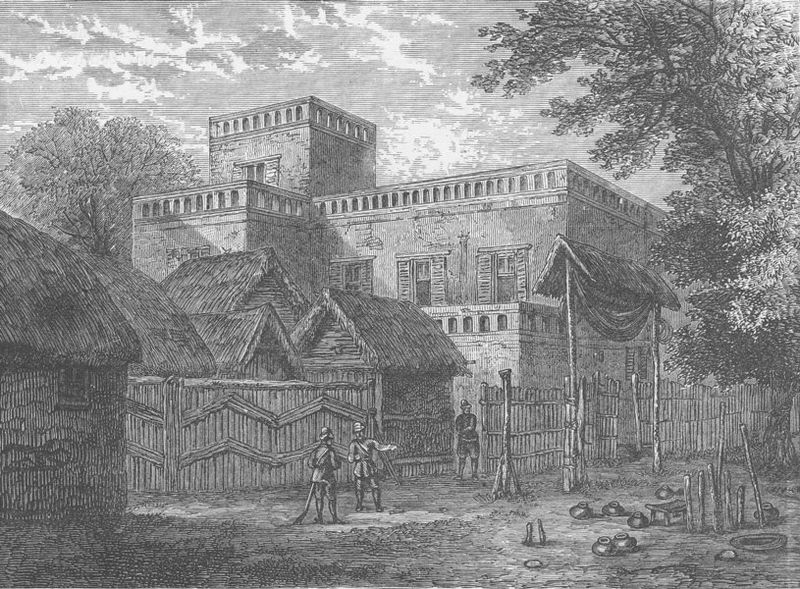
Aban Palace at the time of the Third Anglo-Ashanti War in 1874

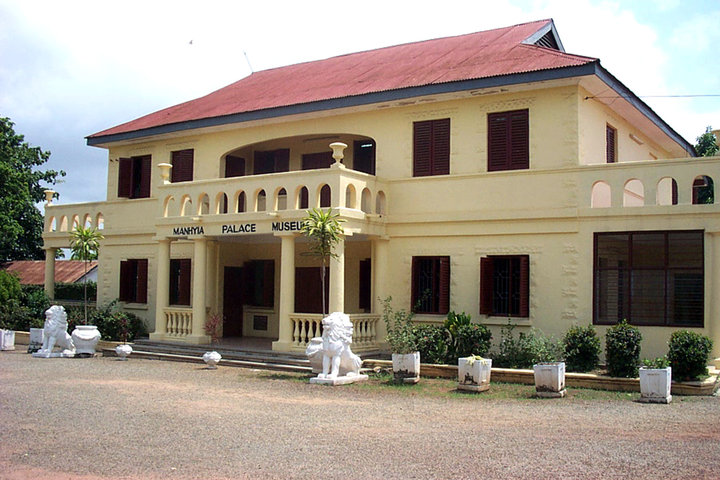
Manhyia Palace. Current official residence of the Asantehene.

Former and current residences of Asantehene

The current residence of the Asantehene is the Manhyia Palace built in 1925 by the British and presented to the Prempeh I as a present upon his return from exile. The original palace of the Asantehene in Kumasi was burned down by the British in 1874. From European accounts, the edifice was massive and ornately built. In 1819, English traveler and author, Thomas Edward Bowdich described the palace complex as

...an immense building of a variety of oblong courts and regular squares [with] entablatures exuberantly adorned with bold fan and trellis work of Egyptian character. They have a suite of rooms over them, with small windows of wooden lattice, of intricate but regular carved work, and some have frames cased with thin gold. The squares have a large apartment on each side, open in front, with two supporting pillars, which break the view and give it all the appearance of the proscenium or front of the stage of the older Italian theaters. They are lofty and regular, and the cornices of a very bold cane-work in alto-relievo. A drop-curtain of curiously plaited cane is suspended in front, and in each, we observed chairs and stools embossed with gold, and beds of silk, with scattered regalia.

Winwood Reade also described his visit to the Asante Royal Palace of Kumasi in 1874:

"We went to the king's palace, which consists of many courtyards, each surrounded with alcoves and verandahs, and having two gates or doors, so that each yard was a thoroughfare . . . But the part of the palace fronting the street was a stone house, Moorish in its style . . . with a flat roof and a parapet, and suites of apartments on the first floor. It was built by Fanti masons many years ago. The rooms upstairs remind me of Wardour Street. Each was a perfect Old Curiosity Shop. Books in many languages, Bohemian glass, clocks, silver plate, old furniture, Persian rugs, Kidderminster carpets, pictures and engravings, numberless chests and coffers. A sword bearing the inscription From Queen Victoria to the King of Ashantee. A copy of the Times, 17 October 1843. With these were many specimens of Moorish and Ashanti handicraft."

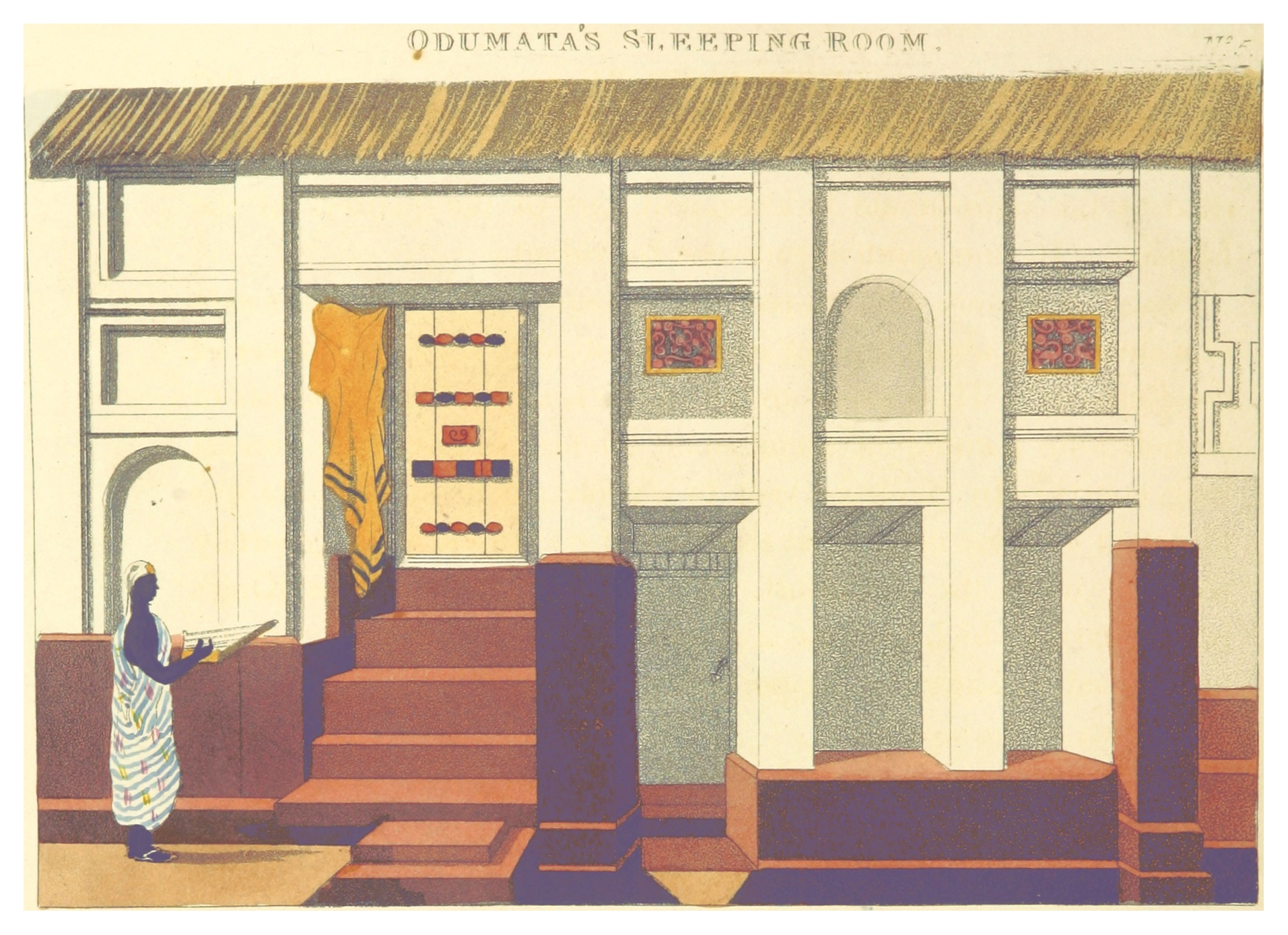
Odumata's Sleeping Room (1819).

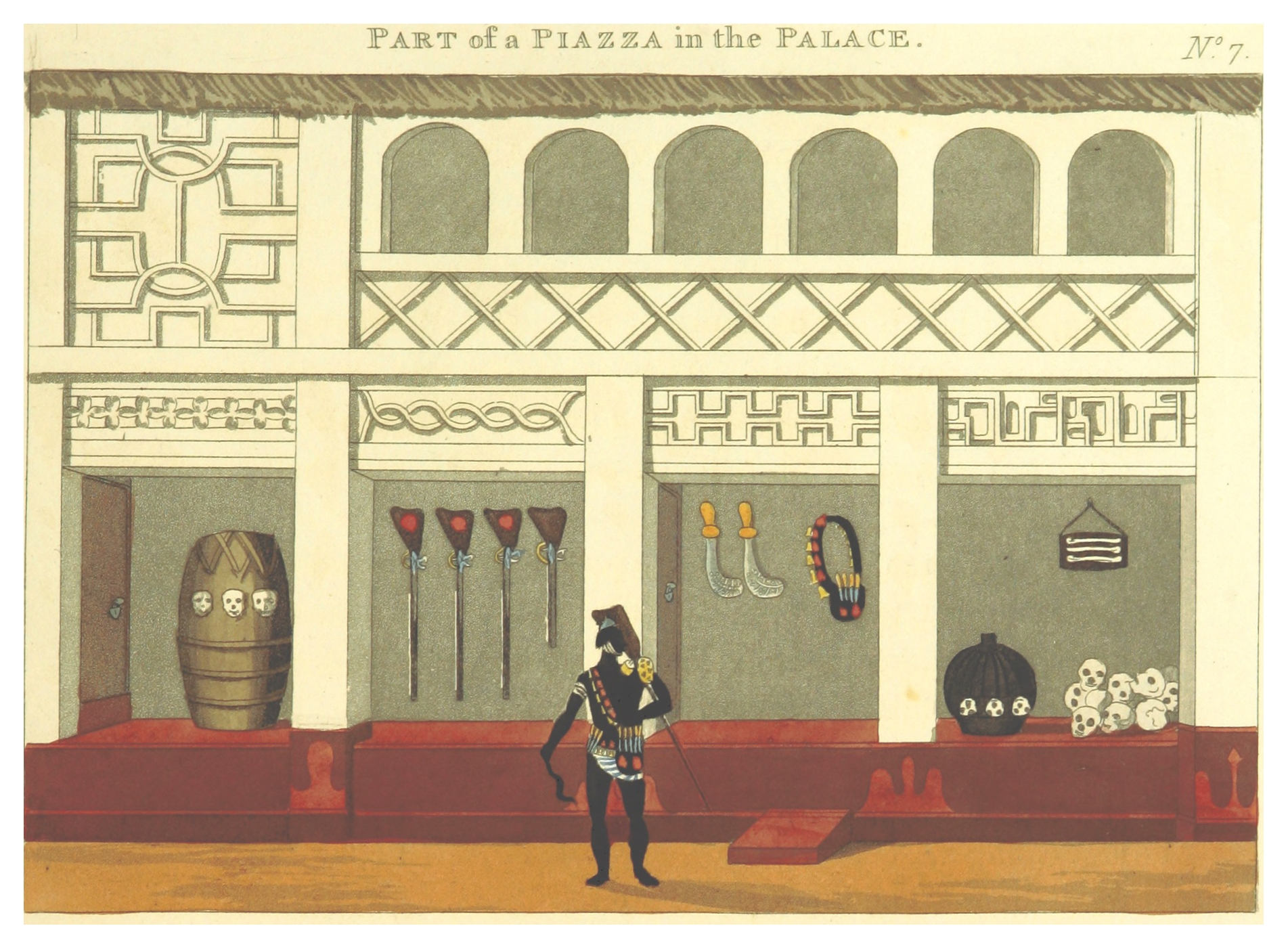
Piazza in the Palace (1819).

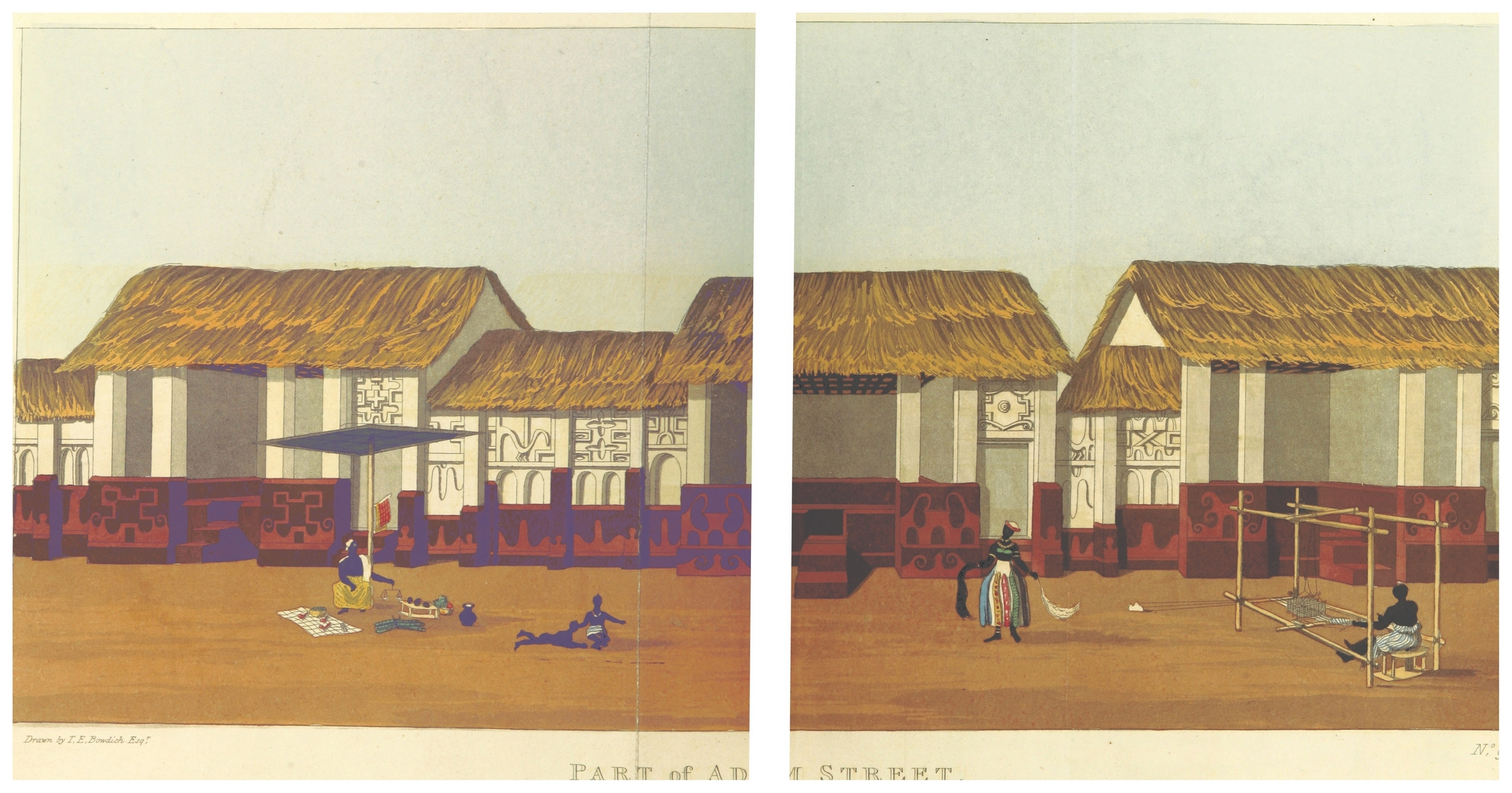
Adum Street (1819).

==== Asanteman council ====
This institution assisted the Asantehene and served as an advisory body to the king. The council was made up of Amanhene or paramount chiefs who were leaders of the various Asante states. The council also included other provincial chiefs. By law the Asantehene never ignored the decisions of the Asanteman council. Doing so could get him de-stooled from the throne.

==== Amanhene ====
The Asante Empire was made up of metropolitan and provincial states. The metropolitan states were made up of Asante citizens known as amanfo. The provincial states were other kingdoms absorbed into the empire. Every metropolitan Asante state was headed by the Amanhene or paramount chief. Each of these paramount chiefs served as principal rulers of their own states, where they exerted executive, legislative and judicial powers.

==== Ohene ====
The Ohene is a male representative of his mother's family, where he is chosen from. The Ohene were divisional chiefs under the Amanhene. Their major function was to advise the Amanhene. The divisional chiefs were the highest order in various Asante state divisions. The divisions were made up of various villages put together. Examples of divisional chiefs included Krontihene, Nifahene, Benkumhene, Adontenhene and Kyidomhene.

==== Odikuro ====
Each village in Asante had a chief called Odikro who was the owner of the village. The Odikro was responsible for the maintenance of law and order. He also served as a medium between the people of his jurisdiction, the ancestor and the gods. As the head of the village, the Odikro presided over the village council.

==== Queen ====
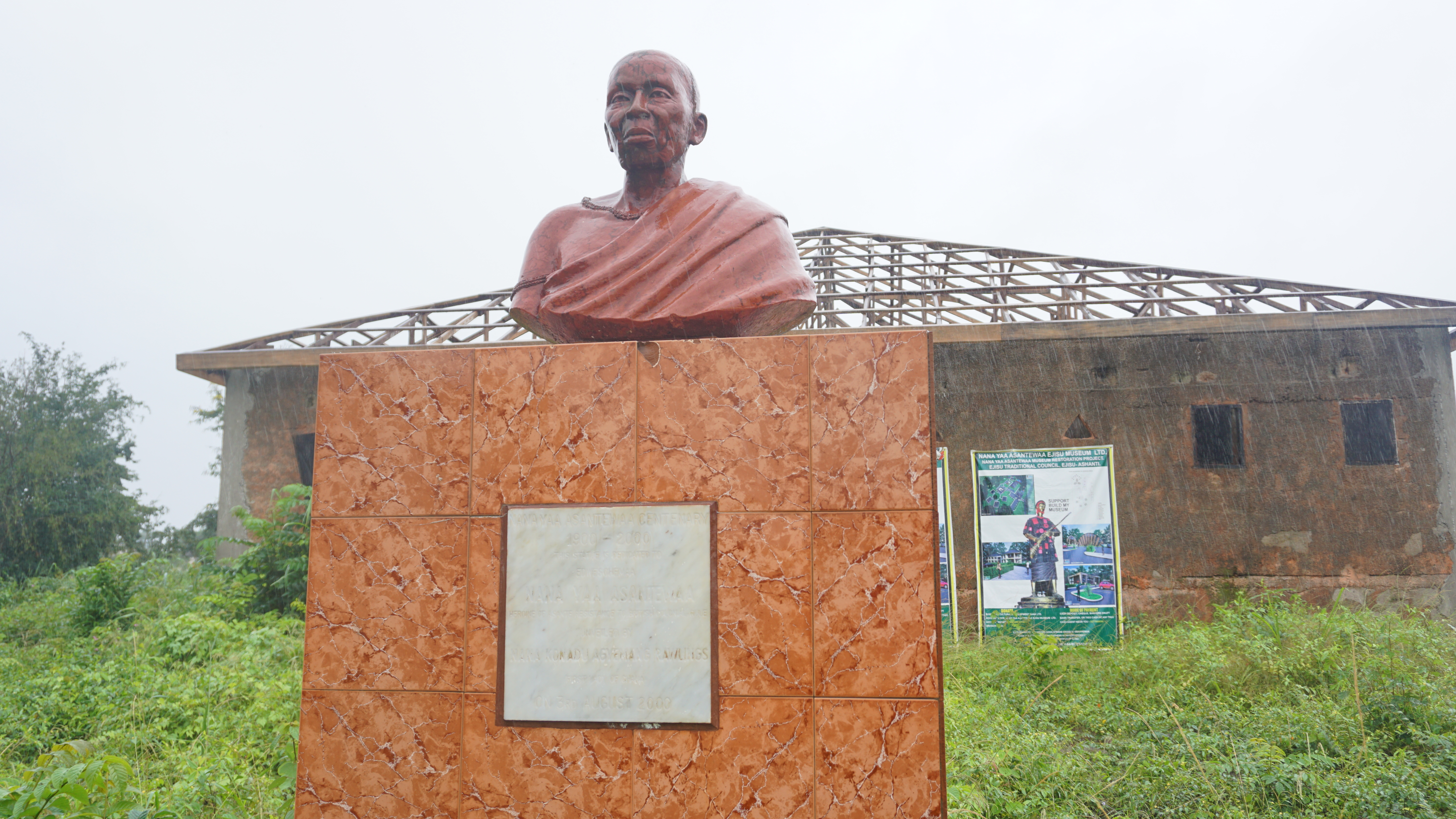
Queen Yaa Asantewaa led her state, Ejisu, in the War of the Golden Stool against the British.

The queen or Ohenemaa was an important figure in Asante political systems. She was the most powerful female in the Empire, because the Ohene represents her or her family and is either her son or her sister's son. She has the power to be King, if she desires but would rather see her son or her maternal nephew(which is also considered her 2nd child in African culture). She had the prerogative of being consulted in the process of installing a chief or the king, as she played a major role in the nomination and selection. She settled disputes involving women and was involved in decision-making alongside the Council of elders and chiefs. Not only did she participate in the judicial and legislative processes, but also in the making and unmaking of war, and the distribution of land.

==== Obirempon ====
Successful entrepreneurs who accumulated large wealth and men as well as distinguished themselves through heroic deeds were awarded social and political recognition by being called "Abirempon" or "Obirempon" which means big men. By the eighteenth and nineteenth centuries AD, the appellation "Abirempon" had formalized and politicized to embrace those who conducted trade from which the whole state benefited. The state rewarded entrepreneurs who attained such accomplishments with Mena (elephant tail) which was the "heraldic badge" Obirempons had a fair amount of legislative power in their regions, more than the local nobles of Dahomey but less than the regional governors of the Oyo Empire. In addition to handling the region's administrative and economic matters, the obirempon also acted as the Supreme Judge of their jurisdiction, presiding over court cases.

==== Kotoko council ====
The Kotoko was a government council in the Asante government. Politically, the kotoko council served as the counterweight to the king's council of elders and basically embodied the aristocratic party in the government. The council formed the Legislature of Asante governmental system. It was made up of the Asantehene, the Queen mother as well as the state chiefs and their ministers.

=== Elections ===
The election of Kings and the Asantehene (King of Kings or emperor ) himself followed a pattern. The senior female of the kingly lineage nominated the eligible males. This senior female then consulted the elders, male and female, of that line. The final candidate is then selected. That nomination was sent to a council of elders, who represented other lineages in the town or district.

The Elders then presented the nomination to the assembled people. If the assembled citizens disapproved of the nominee, the process was restarted. Chosen, the new Kings were enstooled by the Elders, who admonished him with expectations. The chosen Kings swore a solemn oath to the Earth Goddess and to his ancestors to fulfill his duties honorably in which he "sacrificed" himself and his life for the betterment of the state.

This elected King enjoyed a ceremony. He reigned with much power, including the ability to make judgments of life and death on his subjects. However, he did not enjoy absolute rule. Upon the stool, the King was sacred. He served as the holy intermediary between the people and the ancestors. His powers were theoretically more apparent and hinged on his attention to the advice and decisions of the Council of Elders.

=== Impeachment ===
Kings of the Asante Empire who violated any of the oaths taken during his or her enstoolment, were destooled by Kingmakers. For instance, if a king punished citizens arbitrarily or was exposed as corrupt, he would be destooled. Destoolment entailed kingmakers removing the sandals of the king and bumping his buttocks on the ground three times. Once destooled from office, his sanctity and thus reverence were lost, as he could not exercise any of the powers he had as king; this includes Chief administrator, Judge, and Military Commander. The now previous king was dispossessed of the Stool, swords and other regalia which symbolized his office and authority.

He also lost his position as custodian of the land. However, even if destooled from office, the king remained a member of the royal family from which he was elected. An impeachment occurred during the reign of Kusi Obodom, caused by a failed invasion of Dahomey.

=== Civil service ===
The Asantehene was assisted by a civil service of men talented in trade, diplomacy, and the military, with a head called the Gyaasehene. Men from the Arabian Peninsula, Sudan, and Europe were employed in the Asante empire civil service; all of whom were appointed by the Asantehene.

=== Communication ===
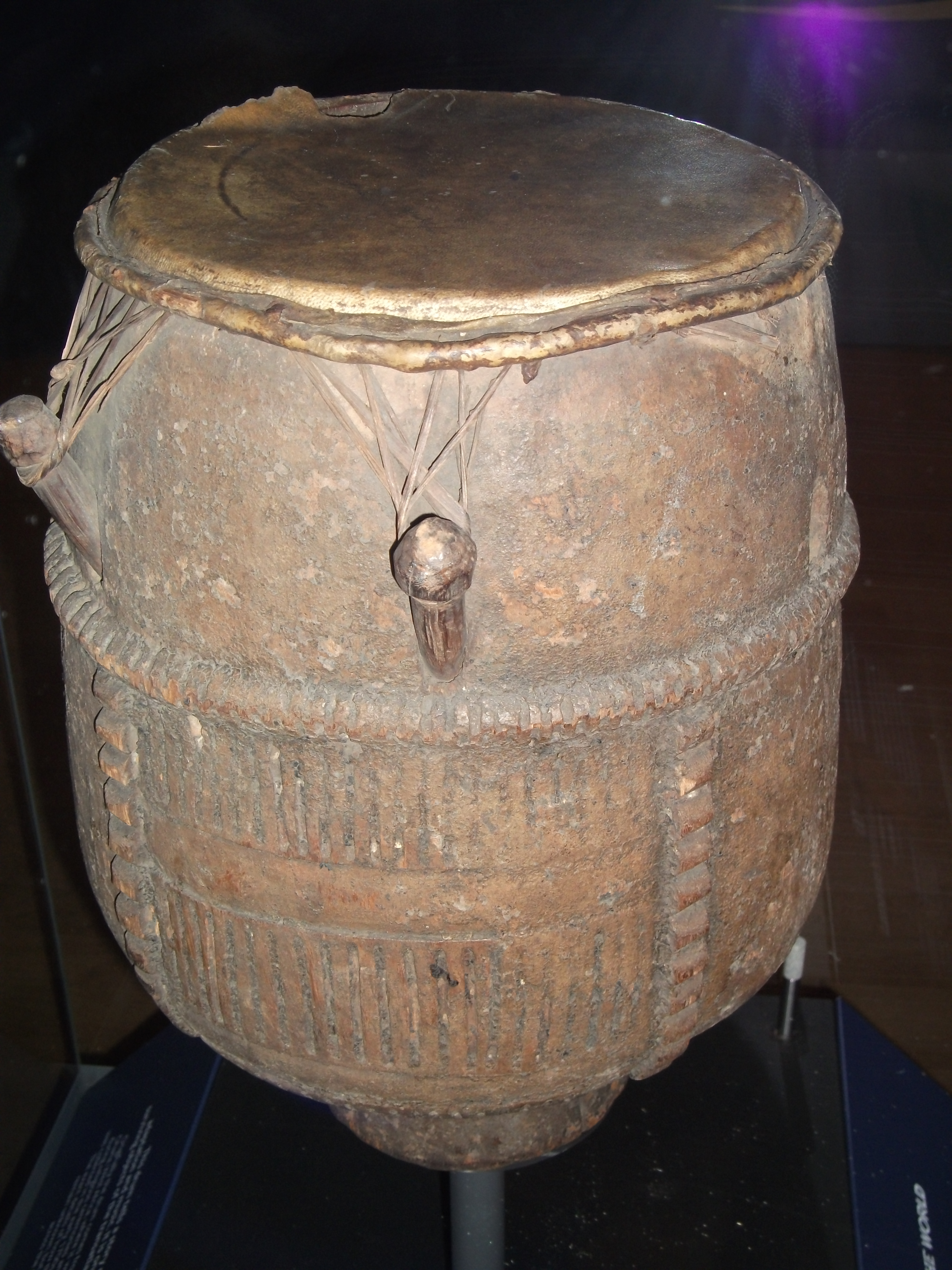
Akan drum

The Asante invented the Fontomfrom, an Asante talking drum, and they also invented the Akan Drum. They drummed messages to distances of over 300 kilometres (200 mi), as rapidly as a telegraph. Asante dialect (Twi) and Akan, the language of the Asante people is tonal and more meaning is generated by tone. The drums reproduced these tones, punctuations, and the accents of a phrase so that the cultivated ear heard the entirety of the phrase itself.

The Asante readily heard and understood the phrases produced by these "talking drums". Standard phrases called for meetings of the chiefs or to arms, warned of danger, and broadcast announcements of the death of important figures. Some drums were used for proverbs and ceremonial presentations.

Although pre-literate, the Asante recruited literate individuals into its government to increase the efficiency of the state's diplomacy. Some written records were also kept. Historian Adjaye, gives estimates based on surviving letters by the Asante that documents from the Asante government "could have exceeded several thousands." Writing was also used in record keeping during court proceedings. Bowdich documented in the early nineteenth century about the "trial of Apea Nyano" on 8 July 1817 where he states that "the Moorish secretaries were there to take notes of the transactions of the day." Wilks adds that such transcripts have not survived today.

Before the 19th century, couriers were trained to memorize the exact contents of the verbal message and by the 19th century, the Asante government relied on writing for diplomacy. In the 1810s, it was common for couriers to be deployed with despatch boxes. For Wilks, evidence exists on the use of mounted couriers during the reign of Kwaku Dua I around the Metropolitan districts. He cites a case In 1841 when Freeman documented the arrival of a party of messengers sent by the Asantehene to Kaase. The chief of these messengers "rode on a strong Asante pony, with an Arabic or Moorish saddle and bridle." Wilks argues the tsetse fly nullified the extensive use of horses to speed communications.

== Legal system ==
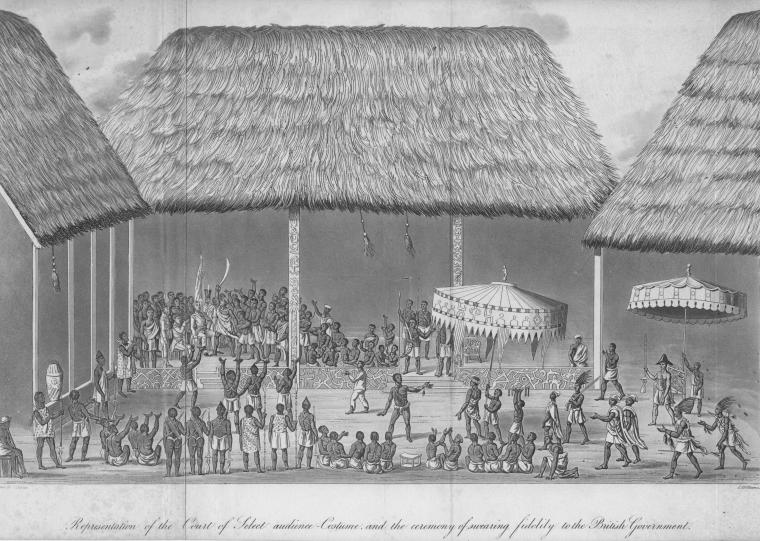
Pramakeseso in 1820

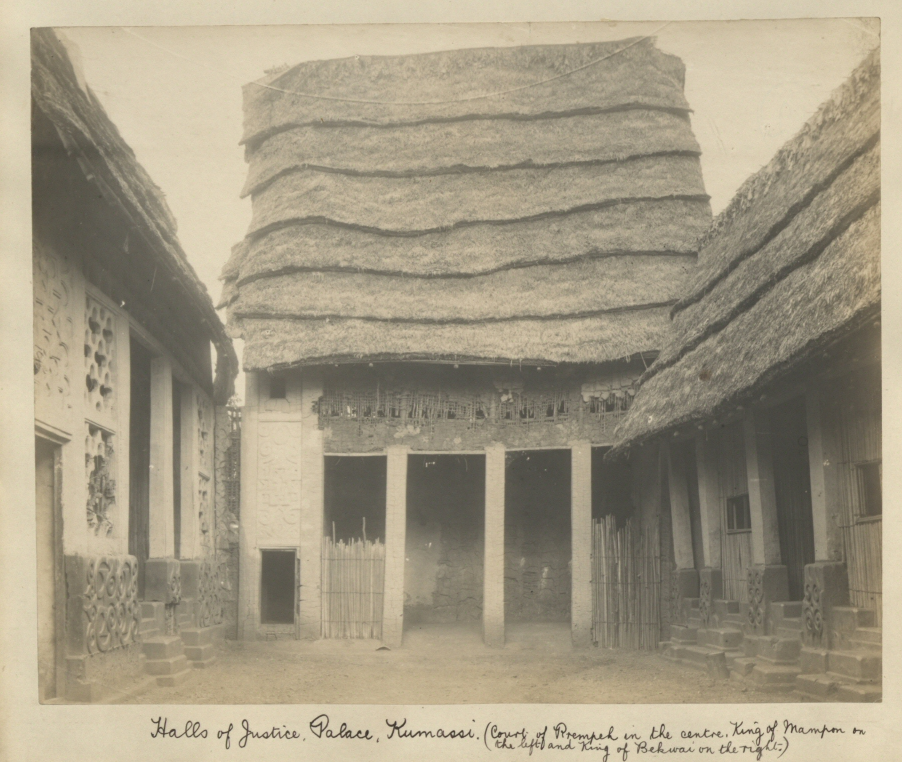
Ruins in the late 19th or early 20th century

The Pramakeseso or Great Court served as the abode where the Council of Kumasi assembled. Marie-Joseph Bennet documented in the 1870s that "The meeting of the supreme court of justice and legislation takes place every day in the great court of the royal palace called Apramosso (Pramakeseso)." The court measured 30 to 35 meters long by 14 to 15 meters wide.

Okomfo Anokye was responsible for creating the Seventy-Seven Laws of Komfo Anokye which served as the codified constitution of the Ashanti Empire.

The Asante state, in effect, was a theocracy. It invokes religious, rather than secular-legal postulates. What the modern state views as crimes, Ashanti view practically as sins. Antisocial acts disrespect the ancestors, and are only secondarily harmful to the community. If the chief or King fails to punish such acts, he invokes the anger of the ancestors and the gods, and is therefore in danger of impeachment. The penalty for some crimes (sins) is death, but this is seldom imposed; a more common penalty is banishment or imprisonment. The King typically exacts or commutes all capital cases. These commuted sentences by King and chiefs sometimes occur by ransom or bribe; they are regulated in such a way that they should not be mistaken for fines, but are considered as revenue to the state, which for the most part welcomes quarrels and litigation. Commutations tend to be far more frequent than executions.

Asante are repulsed by murder, and suicide is considered murder. They decapitate those who commit suicide, the conventional punishment for murder. The suicide thus had contempt for the court, for only the King may kill an Asante.

In a murder trial, intent must be established. If the homicide is accidental, the murderer pays compensation to the lineage of the deceased. The insane cannot be executed because of the absence of responsible intent – except for murder or cursing the King; in the case of cursing the king, drunkenness is a valid defense. Capital crimes include murder, incest within the female or male line, and intercourse with a menstruating woman, rape of a married woman, and adultery with any of the wives of a chief or the King. Assaults or insults of a chief or the court or the King also carried capital punishment.

Cursing the King, calling down powers to harm the King, is considered an unspeakable act and carries the weight of death. One who invokes another to commit such an act must pay a heavy indemnity. Practitioners of harmful (evil) forms of sorcery and witchcraft receive death but not by decapitation, for their blood must not be shed. They receive execution by strangling, burning, or drowning.

Ordinarily, families or lineages settle disputes between individuals. Nevertheless, such disputes can be brought to trial before a chief by uttering the taboo oath of a chief or the King. In the end, the King's Court is the sentencing court, for only the King can order the death penalty. Before the Council of Elders and the King's Court, the litigants orate comprehensively. Anyone present can cross-examine the defendant or the accuser, and if the proceedings do not lead to a verdict, a special witness is called to provide additional testimony. If there is only one witness, their sworn oath assures the truth is told. Moreover, that he favours or is hostile to either litigant is unthinkable. Cases with no witness, like sorcery or adultery are settled by ordeals, like drinking poison.

Ancestor Veneration establishes the Asante moral system, and it provides the principal foundation for governmental sanctions. The link between mother and child centres the entire network, which includes ancestors and fellow men as well. Its judicial system emphasizes the Asante conception of rectitude and good behaviour, which favours harmony among the people. The rules were made by Nyame (Supreme God) and the ancestors, and one must behave accordingly.

=== Police ===
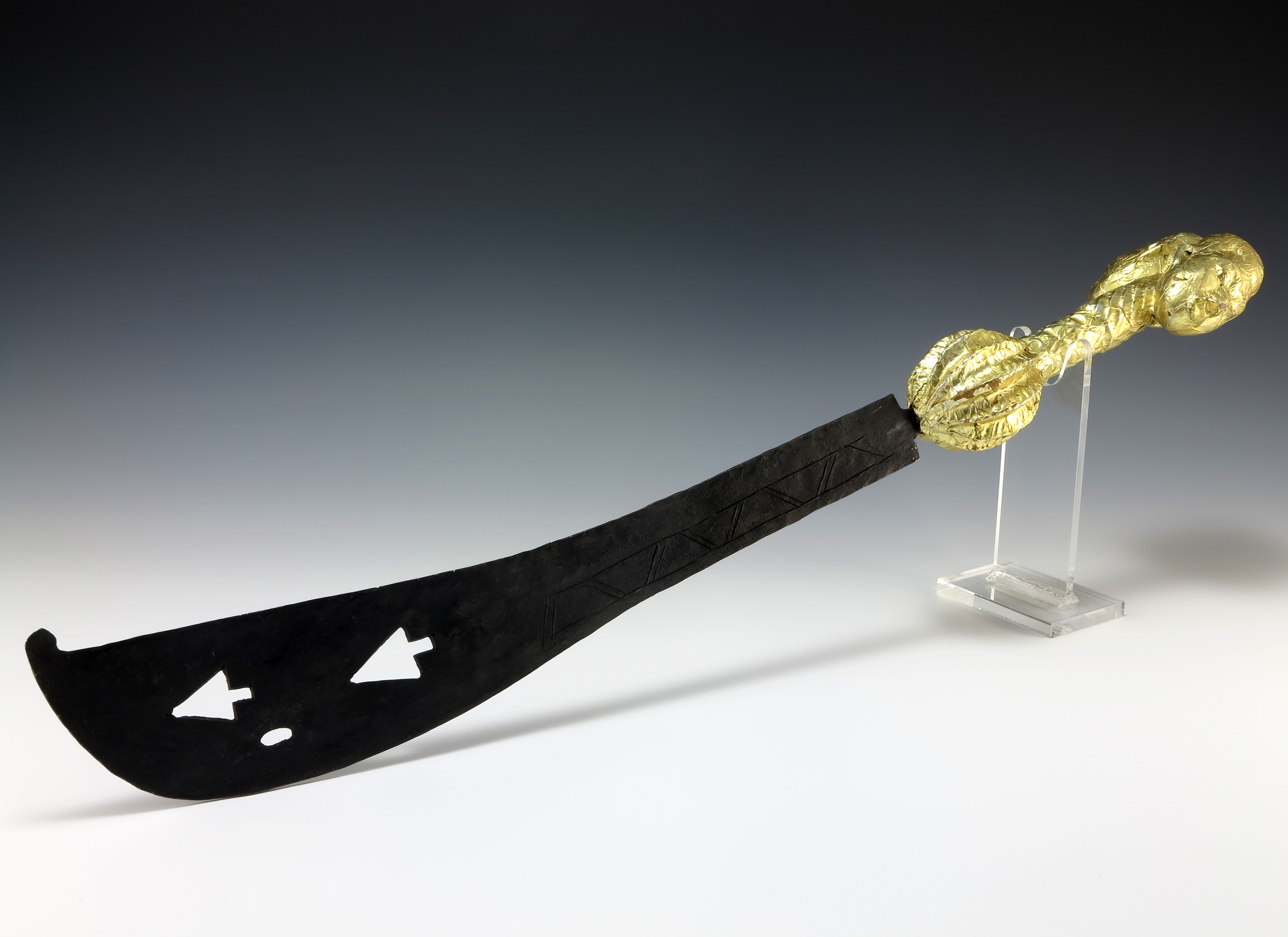
Akofena, ceremonial sword used by the Asante

In the metropolitan areas of Asante, several police forces were responsible for maintaining law and order. In Kumasi, a uniformed police, who were distinguished by their long hair, maintained order by ensuring no one else entered and left the city without permission from the government. The ankobia or special police were used as the empire's special forces and bodyguards to the Asantehene, as sources of intelligence, and to suppress rebellion. The abrafoo, executioners who traditionally performed mass killings whenever an Asantehene or king would die, excited popular alarm by their presence at a royal funeral as recently as 1970.

For most of the 19th century and into the 20th century, the Asante sovereign state remained powerful.

== Geography ==
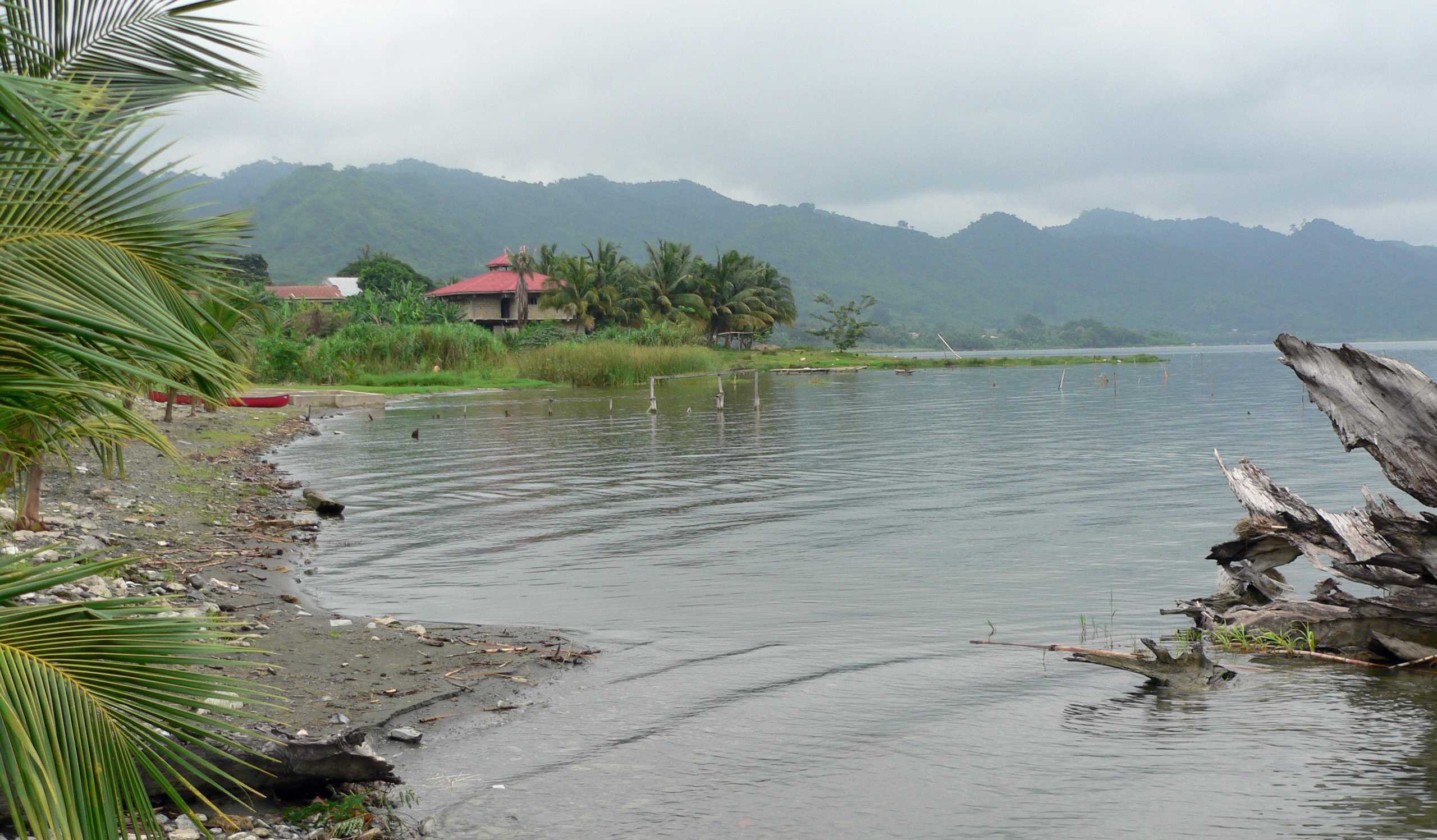
Asante Mountains and Lake Bosumtwi, a natural lake

The Asante Empire was one of a series of states along the coast including Dahomey, Benin, and Oyo. The Asante had mountains and large agricultural surpluses. The southern part of the Asante Empire was covered with moist semi-deciduous forest whilst the Guinea savanna covered the northern part of the state. The Guinea Savanna consists of short deciduous and fire resistant trees. Riparian forests also occur along the Afram River and streams of the savanna zone. Soils in Asante were mainly of two types; forest ochrosols in the southern part of Asante whilst the savanna ochrosols were confined to northern part of the empire.

The predominant fauna or food rich wildlife and animal species encountered in the Asante Empire were the hen, sheep, goat, duck, turkey, rabbit, guinea fowl, fish, and the porcupine which became the national emblem of the state, as well as about thirty multipurpose flora species of trees and shrubs and over thirty-five ornamental plants which beautified the environs of Asante. These tree/shrub-crop-animal (hen/fish) components were intensively integrated spatially and/or sequentially on the same land unit of individual Asante houses.

== Economy ==
=== Resources ===
The lands within the Asante Kingdom were also rich in river-gold, cocoa and kola nuts, and the Asante were soon trading with the Portuguese at coastal fort Sao Jorge da Mina, later Elmina, and with the Hausa states.

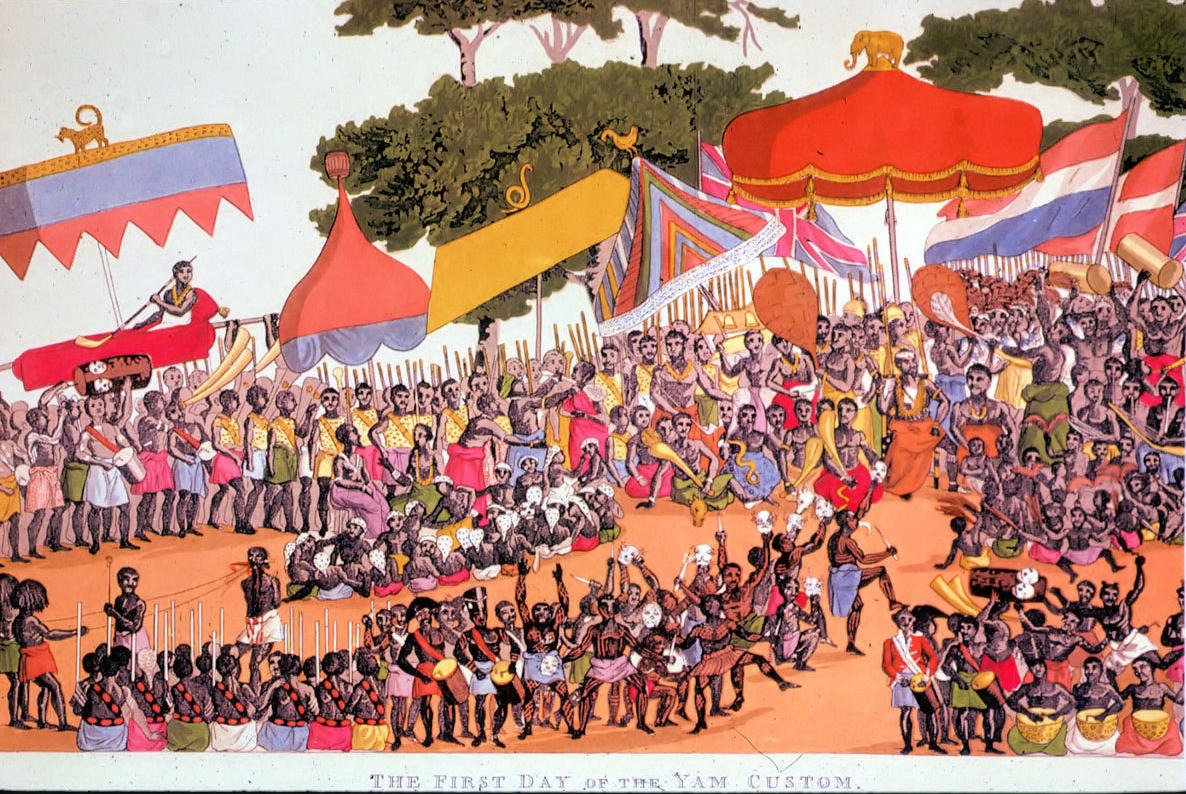
Asante yam ceremony in the Asante Kingdom, 19th century, by Thomas E. Bowdich.

=== Agriculture ===
The Asante prepared the fields by burning before the onset of the rainy season and cultivated with an iron hoe. Fields are left fallow for a couple years, usually after two to four years of cultivation. Plants cultivated include plantains, yams, manioc, corn, sweet potatoes, millet, beans, onions, peanuts, tomatoes, and many fruits. Manioc and corn are New World transplants introduced during the Atlantic European trade. Many of these vegetable crops could be harvested twice a year and the cassava (manioc), after a two-year growth, provides a starchy root.

The Asante transformed palm wine, maize and millet into beer, a favourite drink; and made use of the oil from palm for many culinary and domestic uses.

=== Infrastructure ===
Infrastructure throughout the empire included a network of well-kept roads from the Asante mainland to the Niger river and other trade cities. Stationed at various points of Asante roads were the Nkwansrafo or road wardens who served as the highway police; checking the movement of traders and strangers on all roads. They were also responsible for scouting and were charged with the collection of tolls from traders.

In the early 19th century larger rivers were either forded in the dry season or crossed by canoe or line-and-raft ferries. Smaller rivers were either waded, or were bridged by a tree trunk: in both cases a rope handrail was usually stretched across the river to assist the traveller. In response to the delivery of a carriage by Thomas Freeman in 1841, the Asante Empire began to build bridges across water bodies for transport that year. Asantehene Kwaku Dua ordered proper bridges to be built across streams in the metropolitan area of Kumase. Thomas Freeman described the construction as:

...some stout, forked sticks or posts are driven in the centre of the stream at convenient distances, across which are placed some strong beams, fastened to the posts with withes, from the numerous climbing plants on every hand. On these bearers are placed long stout poles which are covered with earth from fourth to six inches thick; and this completes the bridge.

— Freeman.

English visitors to Kumasi in the 19th century, noted the division of the capital into 77 wards with 27 main streets; one of which was 100 yards wide. Many houses especially those near the king's palace were two story buildings embodied with indoor plumbing in the form of toilets that were flushed with gallons of boiling water. Bowdich revealed in his 1817 account that all streets of Kumasi were named.

== Demography ==
The population history of the Asante Kingdom was one of slow centralization. In the early 19th century the Asantehene used the annual tribute to set up a permanent standing army armed with rifles, which allowed much closer control of the Asante kingdom. The Asante kingdom was one of the most centralised states in sub-Saharan Africa. Osei Tutu and his successors oversaw a policy of political and cultural unification and the union had reached its full extent by 1750. It remained an alliance of several large city-states which acknowledged the sovereignty of the ruler of Kumasi and the Asante kingdom, known as the Asantehene. The Asante kingdom had a dense population of approximately 3 million people, allowing the creation of substantial urban centres across an area of over 250,000 square kilometers.

== Military ==
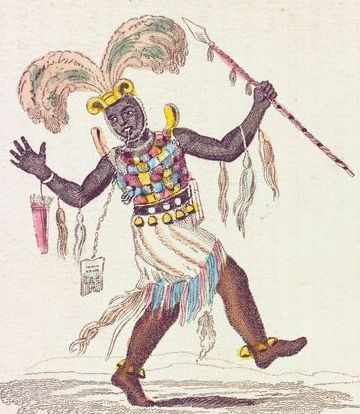
Asante Military Field Marshal, c. 1819, by Thomas E. Bowdich

The Asante armies served the empire well, supporting its long period of expansion and subsequent resistance to European colonization.
Armament was primarily with firearms, but some historians hold that indigenous organization and leadership probably played a more crucial role in Asante successes. These are, perhaps, more significant when considering that the Asante had numerous troops from conquered or incorporated peoples, and faced a number of revolts and rebellions from these peoples over its long history. The political genius of the symbolic "golden stool" and the fusing effect of a national army however, provided the unity needed to keep the empire viable. Total potential strength was some 80,000 to 200,000, making the Asante army bigger than the well known Zulu, and comparable to possibly Africa's largest – the legions of Ethiopia. The Asante army was described as a fiercely organized one whose king could "bring 200,000 men into the field and whose warriors were evidently not cowed by Snider rifles and 7-pounder guns"

While actual forces deployed in the field were less than potential strength, tens of thousands of soldiers were usually available to serve the needs of the empire. Mobilization depended on small cadres of regulars, who guided and directed levees and contingents called up from provincial governors.

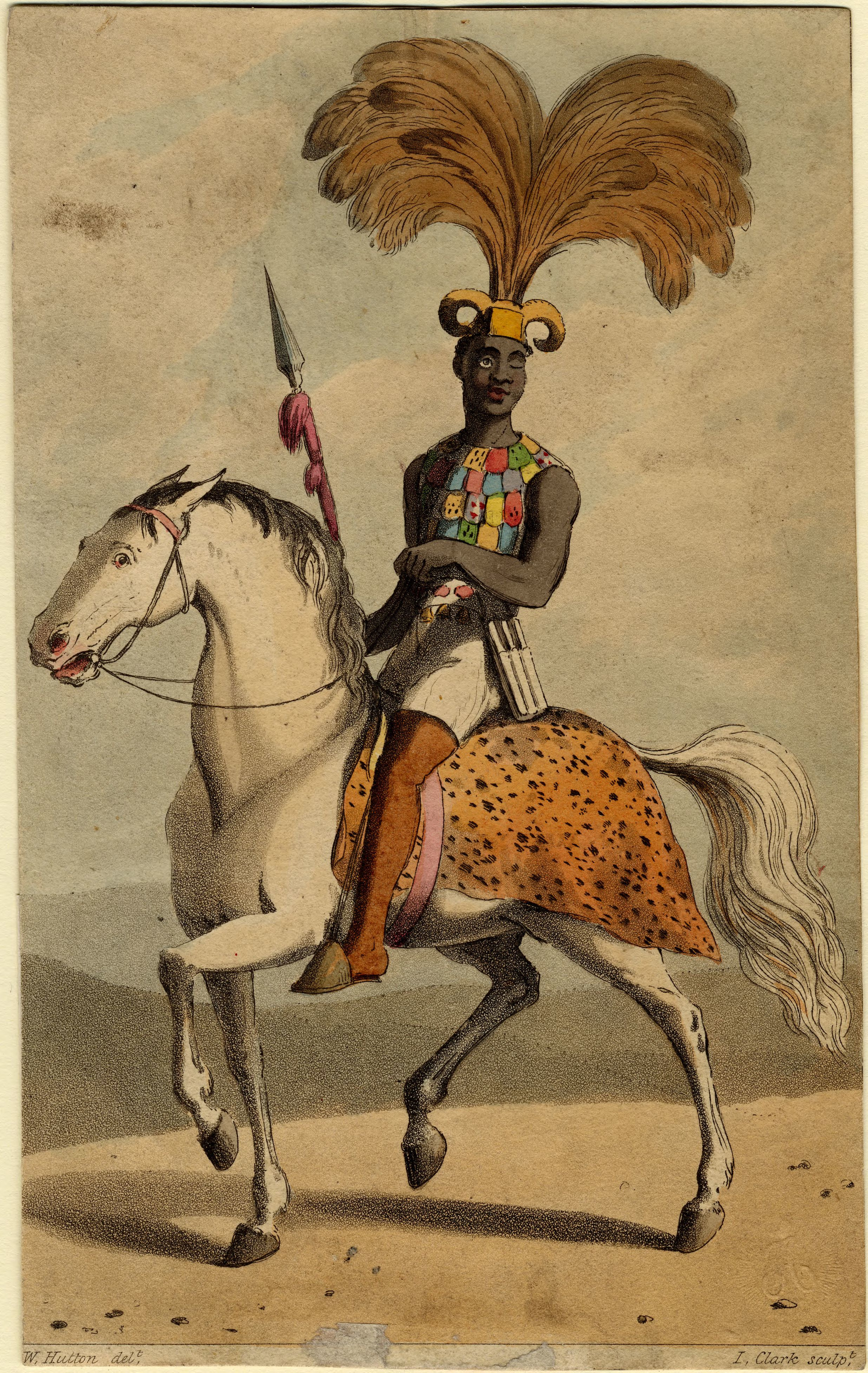
An Asante captain depicted in an 1820 aquatint by William Hutton

Organization was structured around an advance guard, main body, rear guard and two right and left wing flanking elements. This provided flexibility in the forest country the Asante armies typically operated in. Horses were known to survive in Kumasi but because they could not survive in the tsetse fly-infested forest zone in the south, there was no cavalry. Asante high-ranking officers rode horses with the hauteur of European officers but they did not ride to battle. The approach to the battlefield was typically via converging columns, and tactics included ambushes and extensive maneuvers on the wings. Unique among African armies, the Asante deployed medical units to support their fighters. This force was to expand the empire substantially and continually for over a century, and defeated the British in several encounters.

Brass barrel blunderbuss were produced in some states in the Gold Coast including the Asante Empire around the eighteenth and nineteenth centuries. Various accounts indicate that Asante blacksmiths were not only able to repair firearms, but that barrels, locks and stocks were on occasion remade.

== Culture and society ==
=== Family ===
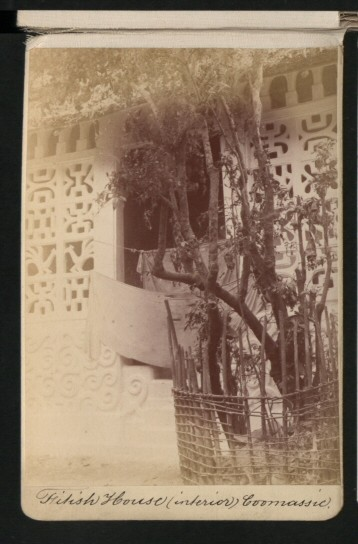
Ashanti architecture (exterior house) Coomassie (Kumasi).c. 1873

Standing among families was largely political. The royal family typically topped the hierarchy, followed by the families of the chiefs of territorial divisions. In each chiefdom, a particular female line provides the chief. A committee of several men eligible for the post elects the chief. The typical Asante family was extended and matrilineal. A mother's brother was the legal guardian of her children. The father on the other hand had fewer legal responsibilities for his children with the exception of ensuring their well-being. Women also had the right to initiate divorce whiles the husband had some legal rights over his wife such as the right to cut off her nose for adultery.

=== Clothing ===
Prominent people wore silk. The ordinary Asante wore cotton whiles slaves dressed in black cloth. Garments signalled the rank of the wearer in society and its colour expressed different meanings. White was worn by ordinary people after winning a court case. Dark colours were worn for funerals or mourning. Laws existed to restrict certain Kente designs to the nobility. Some cotton or silk patterns on the Kente were designed solely for the king and could only be worn with his permission.

=== Education and children ===
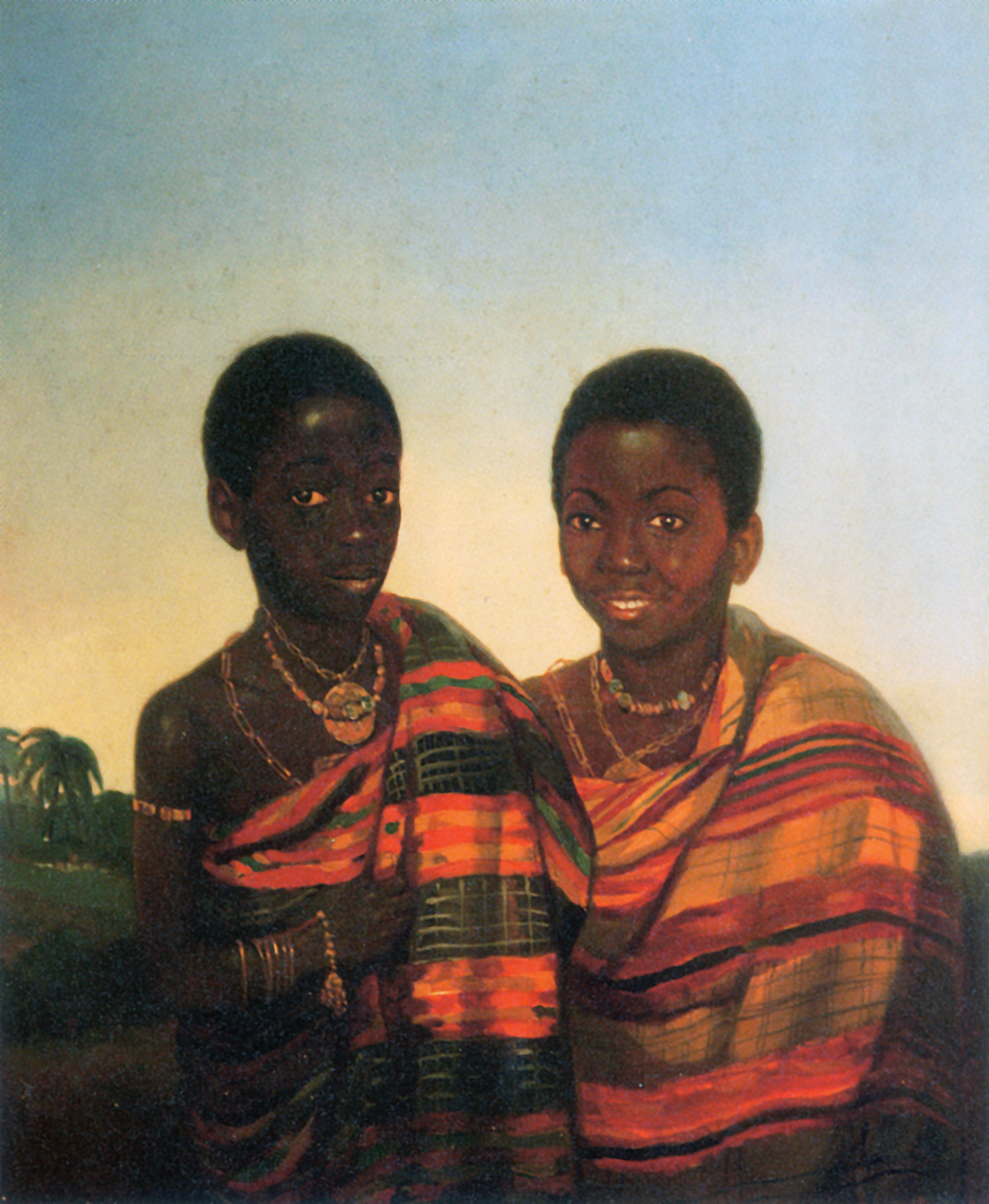
Princes Kwasi Boakye and Kwame Poku, c. 1840.

Education in the Asante Kingdom was conducted by Asante and imported scholars and Asante people would often attend schools in Europe for their higher education.

Tolerant parents are typical among the Asante. Childhood is considered a happy time and children cannot be responsible for their actions. The child is not responsible for their actions until after puberty. A child is harmless and there is no worry for the control of their soul, the original purpose of all funeral rites, so the ritual funerals typically given to the deceased Asante are not as lavish for the children.

The Asante adored twins when they were born within the royal family because they were seen as a sign of impending fortune. Ordinarily, boy twins joined the army and twin girls potential wives of the King. If the twins are a boy and girl, no particular career awaits them. Women who bear triplets are greatly honored because three is regarded as a lucky number. Special rituals ensue for the third, sixth, and ninth child. The fifth child (unlucky five) can expect misfortune. Families with many children are well respected and barren women scoffed at.

=== Adinkra symbols ===
The Asante used Adinkra symbols in their daily society. The symbols were used as a form of decoration, logos, arts, sculpture and pottery.

=== Menstruation and impurity ===
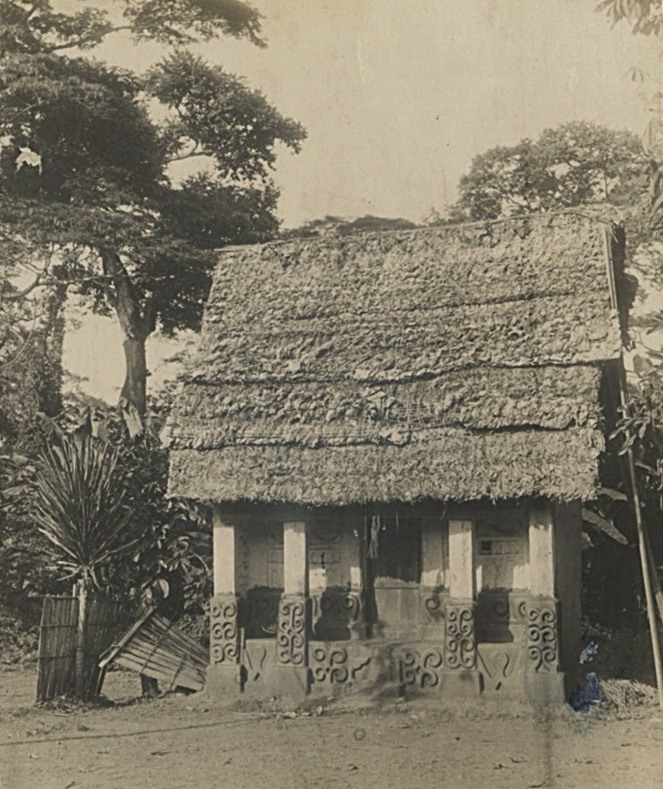
An Asante fetish temple in the village of Jufu by the 19th century

The Asante held puberty rites only for females. Fathers instruct their sons without public observance. The privacy of boys was respected in the Asante kingdom. As menstruation approaches, a girl goes to her mother's house. When the girl's menstruation is disclosed, the mother announces the good news in the village beating an iron hoe with a stone. Old women come out and sing Bara (menstrual) songs.

Menstruating women suffered numerous restrictions. The Asante viewed them as ritually unclean. They did not cook for men, nor did they eat any food cooked for a man. If a menstruating woman entered the ancestral stool (shrine) house, she was arrested, and the punishment could result in death. If this punishment is not exacted, the Asante believe, the ghost of the ancestors would strangle the chief. Menstruating women lived in special houses during their periods as they were forbidden to cross the threshold of men's houses. They swore no oaths and no oaths were sworn for or against them. They did not participate in any of the ceremonial observances and did not visit any sacred places.

=== Healthcare and death ===
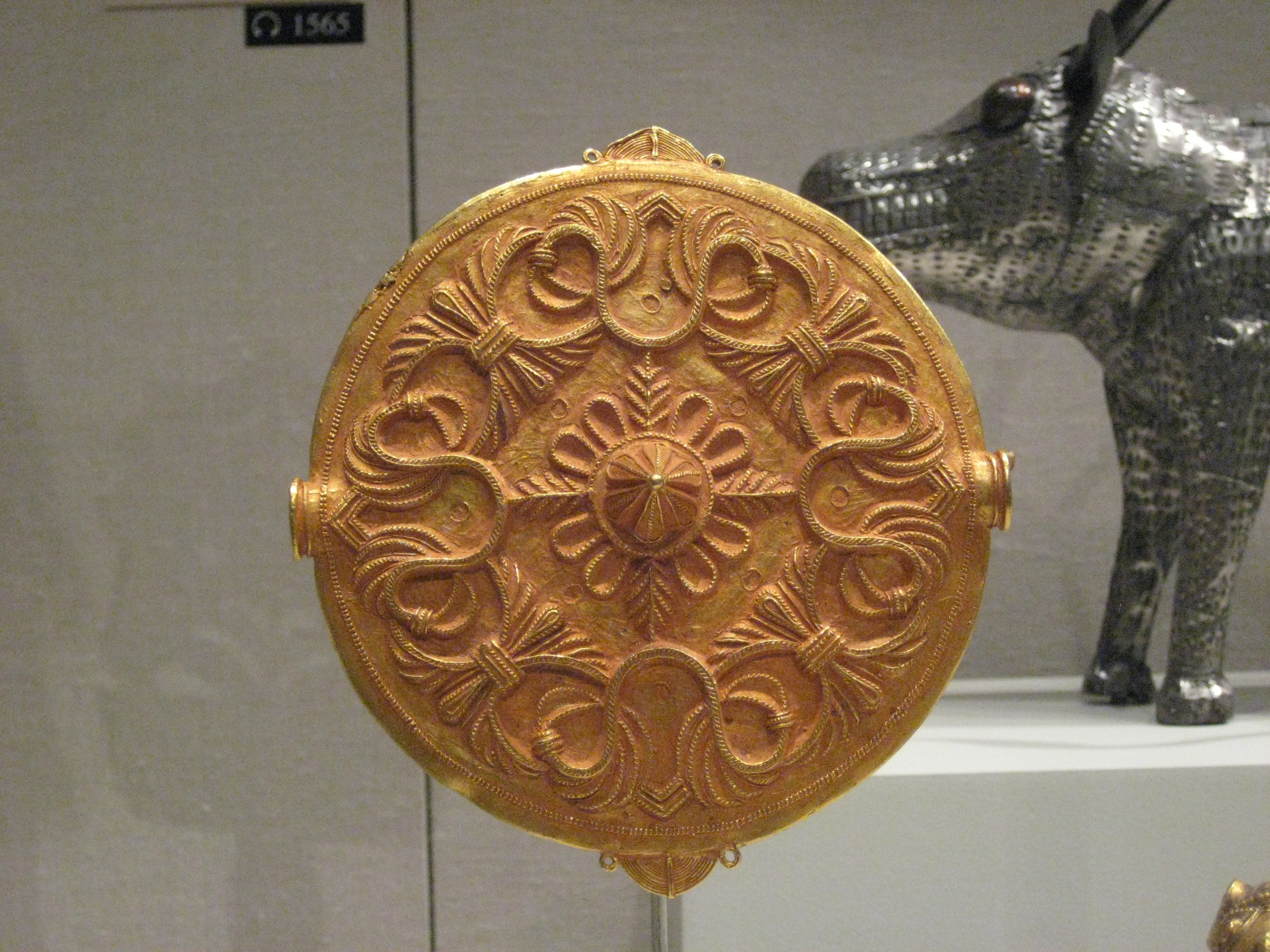
Asante soulwasher

Sickness and death were major events in the kingdom. The ordinary herbalist divined the supernatural cause of the illness and treated it with herbal medicines.

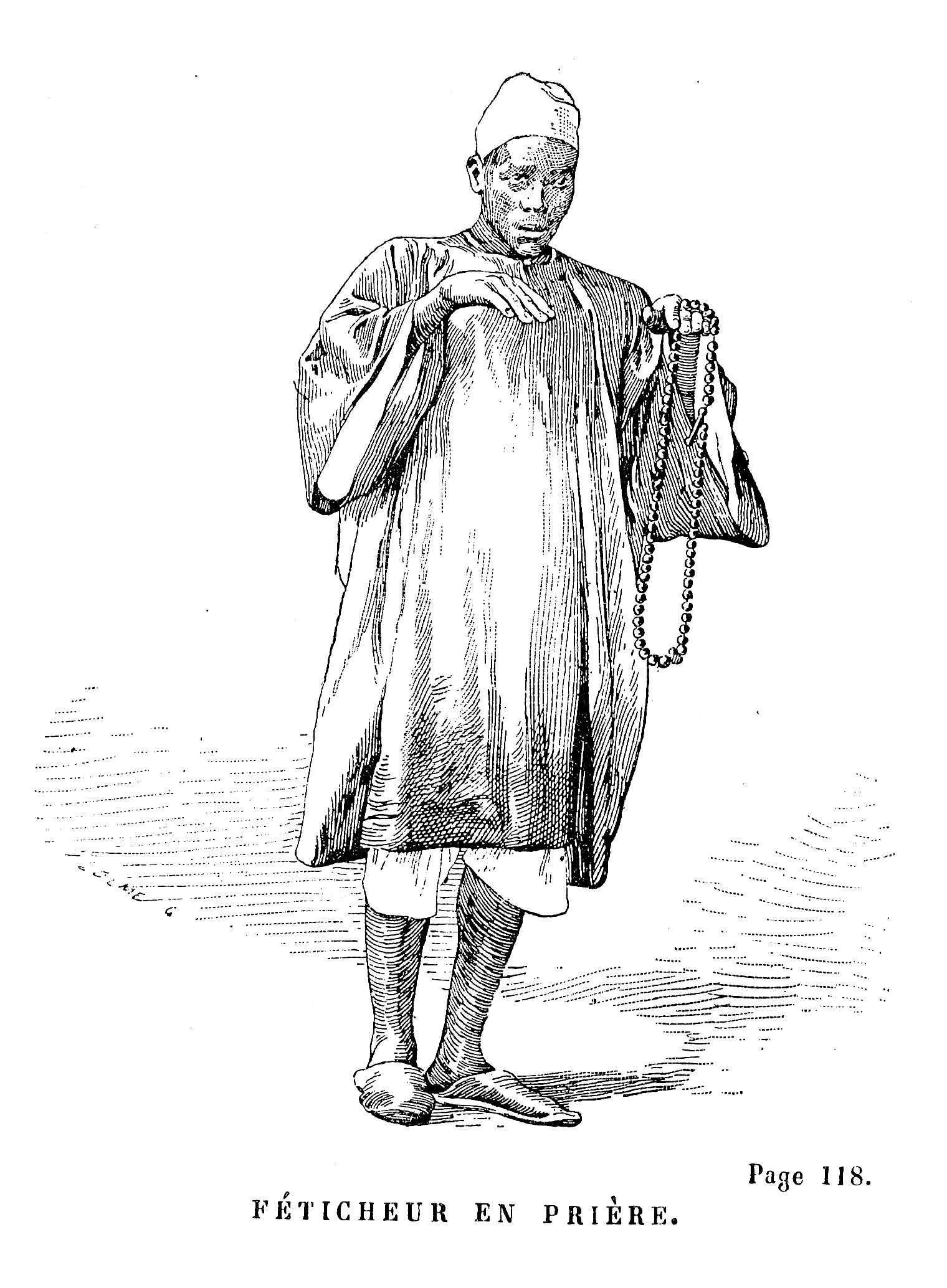
A priest (okomfo) performing an Akan religious ceremony, c. 1873, by Jules Gros

People loathed being alone for long without someone available to perform this rite before the sick collapsed. The family dressed the deceased in their best clothes, and adorned them with packets of gold dust (money for the after-life), ornaments, and food for the journey "up the hill". The body was normally buried within 24 hours. Until that time the funeral party engage in dancing, drumming, shooting of guns, all accompanied by the wailing of relatives. This was done because the Asante typically believed that death was not something to be sad about, but rather a part of life. As the Asante believed in an after-life, families felt they would be reunited with their ancestors upon death. Funeral rites for the death of a king involved the whole kingdom and were a much more elaborate affair.

=== Ceremony ===
The greatest and most frequent ceremonies of the Asante recalled the spirits of departed rulers with an offering of food and drink, asking their favour for the common good, called the Adae. The day before the Adae, Akan drums broadcast the approaching ceremonies. The stool treasurer gathers sheep and liquor that will be offered. The chief priest officiates the Adae in the stool house where the ancestors came. The priest offers each food and a beverage. The public ceremony occurs outdoors, where all the people joined the dancing. Minstrels chant ritual phrases; the talking drums extol the chief and the ancestors in traditional phrases. The Odwera, the other large ceremony, occurs in September and typically lasted for a week or two. It is a time of cleansing of sin from society the defilement, and for the purification of shrines of ancestors and the gods. After the sacrifice and feast of a black hen—of which both the living and the dead share—a new year begins in which all are clean, strong, and healthy.

=== Slavery ===
Slavery was practiced in the Asante Empire, with slaves typically taken as captives from enemies in warfare. The Asante Empire was the largest slaveowning and slave trading state in the territory of today's Ghana during the Atlantic slave trade. The welfare of their slaves varied from being able to acquire wealth and intermarry with the master's family to being sacrificed in funeral ceremonies. The Asante believed that slaves would follow their masters into the afterlife. Slaves could sometimes own other slaves, and could also request a new master if the slave believed he or she was being severely mistreated.

The modern-day Asante claim that slaves were seldom abused, and that a person who abused a slave was held in high contempt by society. They defend the "humanity" of Asante slavery by noting that those slaves were allowed to marry. If a master found a female slave desirable, he might marry her. He preferred such an arrangement to that of a free woman in a conventional marriage, because marriage to an enslaved woman allowed the children to inherit some of the father's property and status.

This favoured arrangement occurred primarily because of what some men considered their conflict with the matrilineal system. Under this kinship system, children were considered born into the mother's clan and took their status from her family. Generally her eldest brother served as mentor to her children, particularly for the boys. She was protected by her family. Some Asante men felt more comfortable taking a slave girl or pawn wife in marriage, as she would have no abusua (older male grandfather, father, uncle or brother) to intercede on her behalf when the couple argued. With an enslaved wife, the master and husband had total control of their children, as she had no kin in the community.

During the reign of Asantehene Osei Kwame Panyin (1777–1803), the sale of Asante citizens into slavery was banned. Wilks argues that the economy of Asante "was not one based upon slave-raiding for export purposes". He cites Asantehene Osei Bonsu's speech to Dupuis in 1820;

I cannot make war to catch slaves in the bush, like a thief. My ancestors never did so. But if I fight a king and kill him when he is insolent, then

certainly I must have his gold, and his slaves, and the people are mine too. Do not White kings act like this?

— Osei Bonsu

He also references Brodie Cruickshank, who wrote in 1853 that "The Ashantee wars are never undertaken expressly to supply this demand." Wilks writes that slaves were more important to the Asante economy in the form of domestic labor in the agricultural and industrial sector than for export in the Atlantic slave trade. Some historians such as Reid and Dalrymple-Smith have commented that the Asante economy did not depend on the Atlantic slave trade. Stilwell states that the Asante rulers traded in slaves but "also sought other economic options."

When the Kingdom of Asante was conquered by the British in 1896, the British assured the chiefs that they would be allowed to keep their slaves; Asante became a colony in 1901 and in 1902 it was made illegal to "compel or attempt the compel the services" or another person, but slavery was not explicitly abolished due to British fear that an abolition would cause "internal disorganization"; chattel slavery was formally banned in 1908, but the British authorities did not enforce the law until the 1920s.

=== Art ===
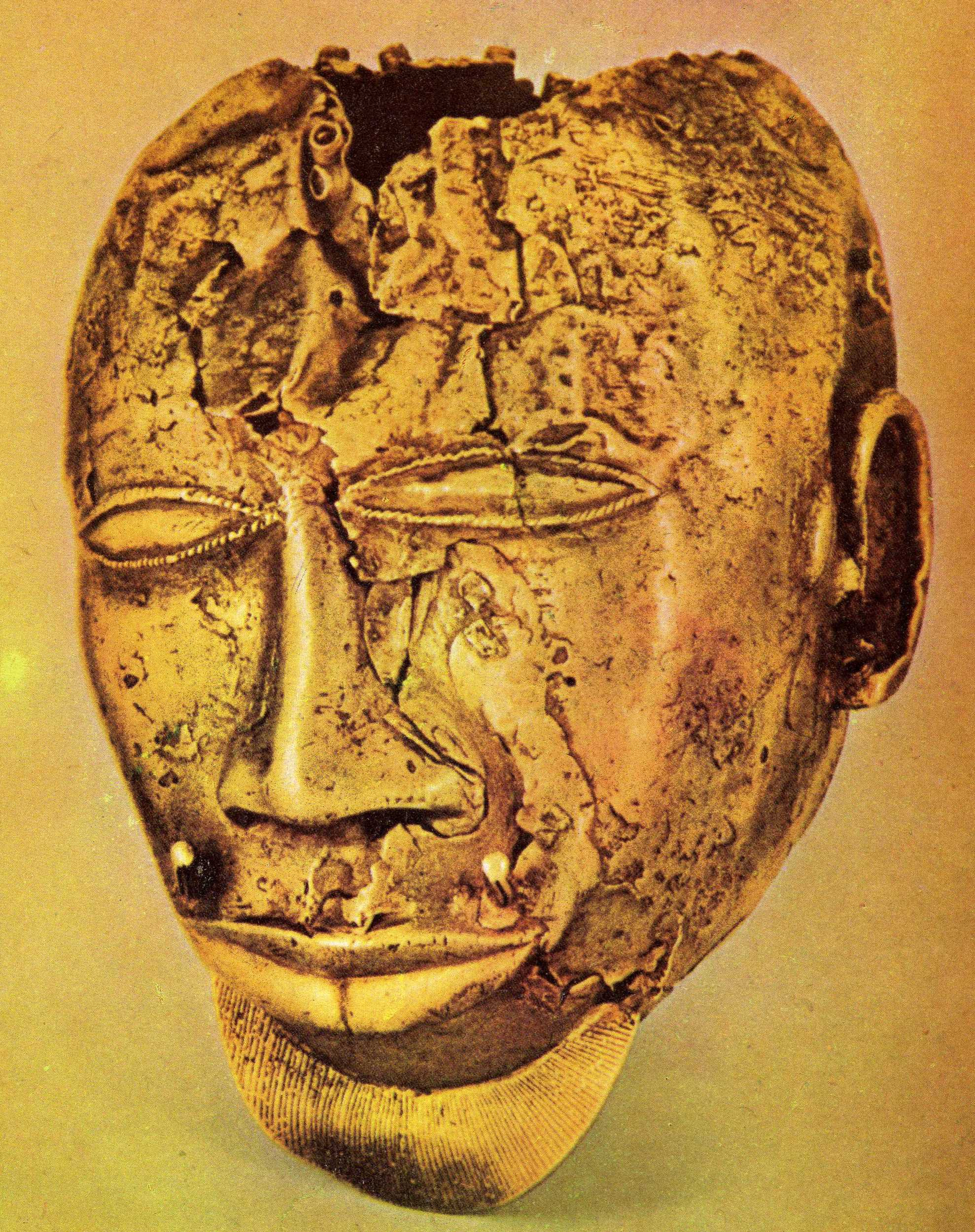
Golden mask property of Asantehene, Kofi Karikari

Asante Empire's involvement in gold, cloth and slave trades brought in abundant wealth and fostered rich artistic traditions. During colonization, the British took many artifacts. In February 2024, some of these, on display in a U.S. museum, were returned to Ghana. The repatriation has been termed "the return of our souls" and activists hope that eventually all of the artifacts will be returned.

=== Architecture ===
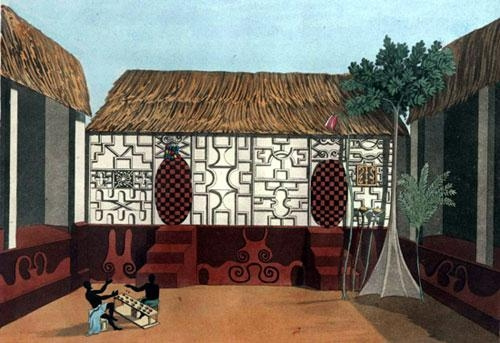
Picture of Asante architecture drawn by Thomas Edward Bowdich, with Adinkra symbols on the walls.

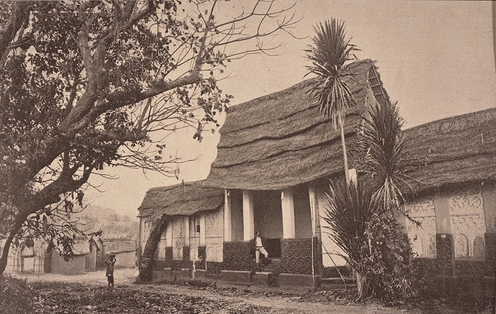
Palace of King Kwaku Dua of Kumasi, Kumasi, 1887.

The Asante traditional buildings are the only remnants of Asante architecture. Construction and design consisted of a timber framework filled up with clay and thatched with sheaves of leaves. The surviving designated sites are shrines, but there have been many other buildings in the past with the same architectural style. These buildings served as palaces and shrines as well as houses for the affluent. The Asante Empire also built mausoleums which housed the tombs of several Asante leaders. Generally, houses whether designed for human habitation or for the deities, consisted of four separate rectangular single-room buildings set around an open courtyard; the inner corners of adjacent buildings were linked by means of splayed screen walls, whose sides and angles could be adapted to allow for any inaccuracy in the initial layout. Typically, three of the buildings were completely open to the courtyard, while the fourth was partially enclosed, either by the door and windows, or by open-work screens flanking an opening.

== In popular culture ==
The Asante Empire has been depicted in a number of different works of nonfiction, detailing the structure of the empire

=== Literature and theatre ===
- The novel The Two Hearts of Kwasi Boachi (1997) is based on the memoirs of Kwasi Boachi, the son of the Asantehene Kwaku Dua I, from when he and his cousin Kwame Poku were sent to the Netherlands in 1837 to receive a European education.
- It was later adapted into an opera in 2007 by the author Arthur Japin and composer Jonathan Dove
- The 2006 novel Copper Sun's protagonist Amari comes from the Asante Empire.

=== Literature ===
- The singer Ashanti was named after the alternative name 'Ashanti empire'. This is because women had power and influence there, and her mother wanted her to follow that model.

=== Television ===
- The Asante Empire is referenced in the Static Shock episodes "Static in Africa" and "Out of Africa", where Static and his family visit Ghana.

=== Video games ===
The Asante Empire has been depicted in some historical war strategy video games, along with being characters in video games with origins from the area.

- In the grand strategy video games Europa Universalis IV (2013) and Victoria 3 (2022), both developed by Paradox Interactive, the Ashanti Empire appears as one of many historical nations that players can play as or interact with.
- In Crusader Kings III, the Ashanti Empire is one of the many nations that players can play or interact as.
- In Assassin's Creed IV: Black Flag, two characters, Kumi Berko, a pirate playable in the multiplayer mode under the pseudonym "The Mercenary", and Antó, a Master Assassin of the West Indies Brotherhood, were both born in the Ashanti Empire.
- The Ashanti Empire appears as a playable minor civilization in Age of Empires III.

== See also ==
- List of rulers of Asante
- Asante People
- Great Akan
- Adanse
- Kingdom of Assin
- Kingdom of Twifo
- Akyem Kingdoms
- Kingdom of Denkyira
- Bonoman
- Fante Confederacy
- Anglo-Ashanti wars
- History of Ghana
- Akyempimhene
- African military systems (1800–1900)
- African military systems after 1900
- African military systems to 1800

== Sources ==
- Addo-Fening, Robert (1997). Akyem Abuakwa, 1700–1943: From Ofori Panin to Sir Ofori Atta. Department of History, Norwegian University of Science and Technology. ISBN 82-7765-019-1.
- Boahen, A. Adu (1973). "Arcany or Accany or Arcania and the Accanists". Transactions of the Historical Society of Ghana. 14: 105–110. JSTOR 41405842.
- Boaten, Kwasi (1971). "The Asante Before 1700". Institute of African Studies Research Review. 8 (1): 50–65.
- Daaku, K. Y. (1966). "Pre-Ashanti States". Ghana Notes and Queries (9). Historical Society of Ghana: 10–13.
- Daaku, K. Y. (1968). "A Note on the Fall of Ahwene Koko and Its Significance in Asante History". Ghana Notes and Queries (10): 40–44.
- Daaku, Kwame Yeboa (1970). Trade and Politics on the Gold Coast, 1600-1720: A Study of the African Reaction to European Trade. Oxford: Clarendon Press. ISBN 0-19-821653-X.
- Davidson, Basil (1991). African Civilization Revisited. Africa World Press. ISBN 978-0-86543-123-2.
- Edgerton, Robert B. (2010). The Fall of the Asante Empire: The Hundred-Year War For Africa's Gold Coast. Simon & Schuster. ISBN 9781451603736.
- Fynn, J. K. (1971). Asante and Its Neighbours, 1700–1807. ISBN 9780582646117.
- Fynn, John Kofi (1973). "Asante and Its Neighbours, 1700–1807". Research Review. 9 (1). University of Ghana, Institute of African Studies: 58–83.
- Fynn, J. K. (1974). "The Structure of Greater Ashanti: Another View". Transactions of the Historical Society of Ghana. 15 (1). Historical Society of Ghana: 1–22.
- Gadzekpo, Seth K. (2005). History of Ghana: Since Pre-history. Excellent Pub. and Print. ISBN 9988070810 – via Books.google.com.
- Gocking, Roger (2005). The History of Ghana. Westport, Connecticut: Greenwood Press. ISBN 0-313-31894-8.
- Kea, Ray A. (1982). Settlements, Trade, and Polities in the Seventeenth Century Gold Coast. Baltimore and London: Johns Hopkins University Press. ISBN 978-0-8018-2310-7.
- Kea, Ray A. (2000). Mogens Herman Hansen (ed.). City-State Culture on the Gold Coast: The Fante City-State Federation in the Seventeenth and Eighteenth Centuries. Historisk-filosofiske Skrifter. Vol. 21. Copenhagen: The Royal Danish Academy of Sciences and Letters. pp. 519–530. ISBN 978-87-7876-177-4. OCLC 46990631.
- Konadu, Kwasi; Campbell, Clifford C. (2016). The Ghana Reader: History, Culture, Politics. Duke University Press. ISBN 978-0-8223-5984-5.
- Lloyd, Alan (1964). The Drums of Kumasi: the story of the Ashanti wars. London: Longmans. LCCN 65006132. OL 5937815M.
- McCaskie, T. C. (2003). State and Society in Pre-colonial Asante. Cambridge University Press. ISBN 978-0-521-89432-6.
- McCaskie, T. C. (2007). "Denkyira in the Making of Asante c. 1660–1720". The Journal of African History. 48 (1): 1–25. doi:10.1017/S0021853706002507. JSTOR 4501014.
- Obeng, J. Pashington (1996). Asante Catholicism; Religious and Cultural Reproduction among the Akan of Ghana. BRILL. ISBN 978-90-04-10631-4.
- Perbi, Akosua Adoma (2004). A History of Indigenous Slavery in Ghana: From the 15th to the 19th Century. Accra: Sub-Saharan Publishers. ISBN 9789988550950.
- Prempeh, Otumfuo Nana Osei Agyeman (2022). McCaskie, Tom C. (ed.). History of Ashanti by Otumfuo, Nana Osei Agyeman Prempeh II. Fontes Historiae Africanae. Liverpool: Liverpool University Press. ISBN 978-1-80596-051-5.
- Shillington, Kevin (1995). History of Africa. New York: St. Martin's Press. ISBN 978-0-312-12598-1.
- Shinnie, Peter (2005). "Early Asante and European Contacts". Journal des Africanistes. 75 (2): 25–42. doi:10.4000/africanistes.113.
- Vivian, Brian C. (December 1996). "Recent Excavations of Adansemanso" (PDF). Nyame Akuma (46): 37–39.
- Wilks, Ivor (1957). "The Rise of the Akwamu Empire, 1650–1710". Transactions of the Historical Society of Ghana. 3 (2): 25–62. JSTOR 41405705.
- Wilks, Ivor (1989). Asante in the Nineteenth Century: The Structure and Evolution of a Political Order. Cambridge University Press Archive. ISBN 978-0-521-37994-6.
- Wilks, Ivor (1993). Forests of Gold: Essays on the Akan and the Kingdom of Asante. Ohio University Press. ISBN 9780821410561.
- Wilks, Ivor (2005). "The Forest and the Twis". Journal des africanistes. 75 (1): 19–75. doi:10.4000/africanistes.188.
- Chazan, Naomi (2023). "The Early State in Africa: The Asante Case". The Early State in African Perspective: Culture, Power and Division of Labor. BRILL. p. 64. ISBN 978-90-04-61800-8.
- Parker, John (2026). Great Kingdoms of Africa. University of California Press. ISBN 9780520395688.
