= Wireko =

Wireko is a surname. Notable people with the surname include:

- Bright Wireko-Brobby (born 1972), Ghanaian politician
- Joseph Dawson Wireko (fl. 1950s), Ghanaian politician

== See also ==
- Wereko
