= Wereko =

Wereko is a surname. Notable people with the surname include:

- Charles Wereko-Brobby (born 1953), Ghanaian engineer, politician, diplomat and businessman
- Oyeeman Wereko Ampem II (1930–2005), Ghanaian civil servant, businessman and traditional ruler

== See also ==
- Wireko
