= Joseph Dawson Wireko =

Ghanaian politician

Member of the Ghana Parliament for Bekwai

Personal details
- Party: Convention Peoples Party
- Occupation: Typist, Clerk

Joseph Dawson Wireko was a Ghanaian politician and a Member of Parliament.

== Career ==
Wireko began his career as a typist and clerk at Essumeja Local Council in Bekwai in the Ashanti Region of Ghana. He was the owner of Pica Printing and Trading Company.

== Politics ==
Wireko was a member of the Convention Peoples Party (CPP). In July 1956, he was elected in the general election to serve in the Legislative Assembly. He was a member of parliament for Bekwai.
