= Akan Drum =

African-made archaeological object found in North America

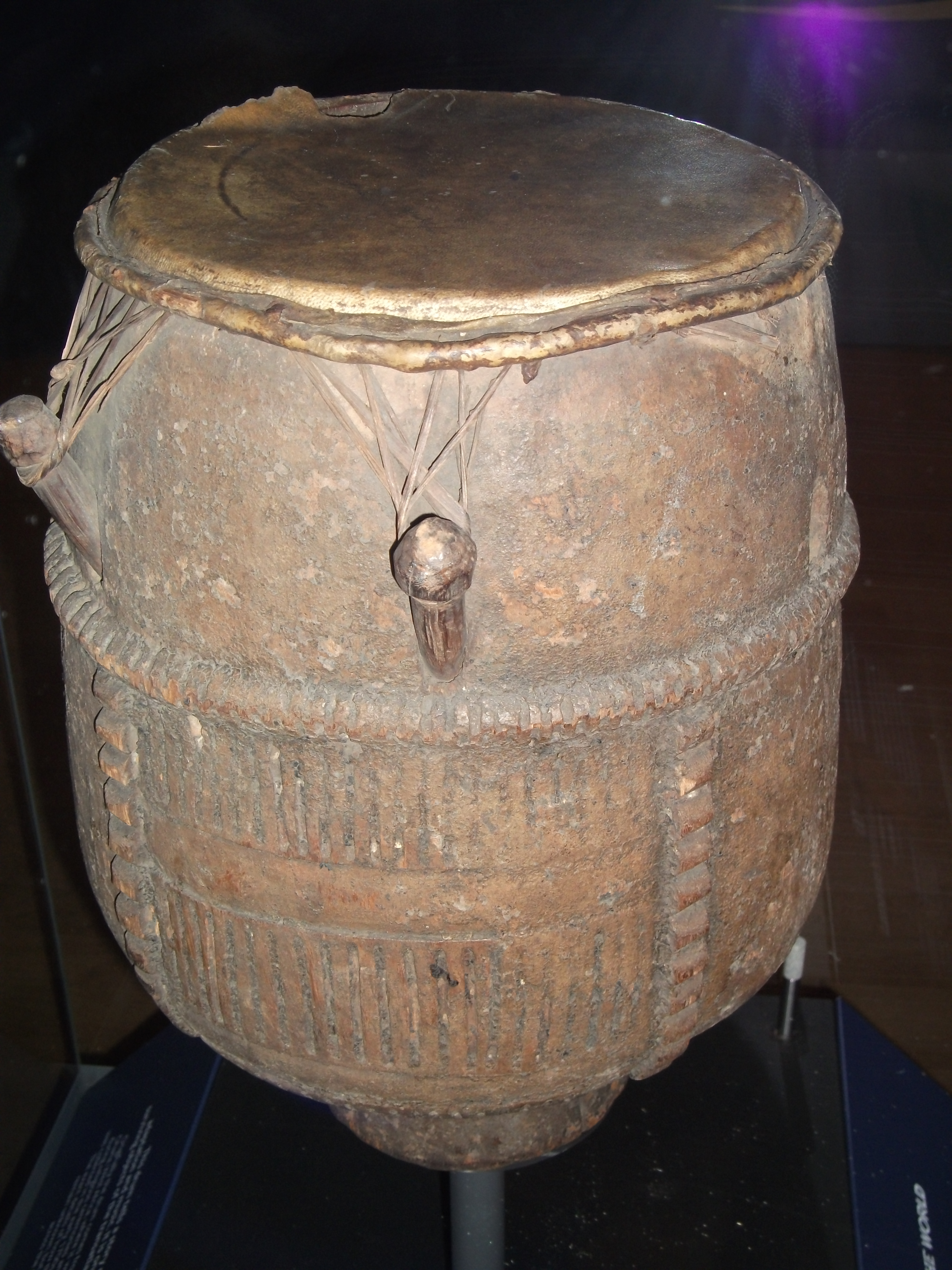
- On display in the British Museum
- Material: Wood, skin and fibre
- Created: 1730-1745
- Place: Ghana region, West Africa
- Present location: Room 26 in the British Museum

The Akan Drum is a drum that was made in West Africa and was later found in the Colony of Virginia in North America. It is now one of the oldest African-American objects in the British Museum and possibly one of the oldest surviving anywhere. The drum is a reminder of all three continents' involvement in the estimated twelve million people transported across the Atlantic Ocean as part of the transatlantic slave trade. The drum is normally displayed in Room 26, the North American gallery, in the British Museum.

== Description ==
The drum is made from two species of wood that are native to sub-Saharan Africa, Baphia and Cordia africana. The latter fine-grained hardwood is known for its ability to be carved and its resonance, which makes it suited to musical instruments. The drumskin came from a deer hide and was stretched over the wooden structure using vegetable fibre.

== Provenance ==
The drum was made in the Ghana region of West Africa between 1700 and 1745, and is presumed to have travelled to America on board a slave ship. As enslaved people had either been prisoners of war or kidnapped from their homes, they wouldn't have been able to carry any personal possessions. So it is presumed that the drum was either brought by a member of the crew or possibly by a son of the African chief who had sold the enslaved people for transportation. To exercise their human property, the slave traders would "dance the slaves". It is supposed that this was why the drum was transported. The word Akan refers to the culture in what is today Ghana and includes the Akwamu, Bono, Akyem, Fante, Asante and Akuapem people.

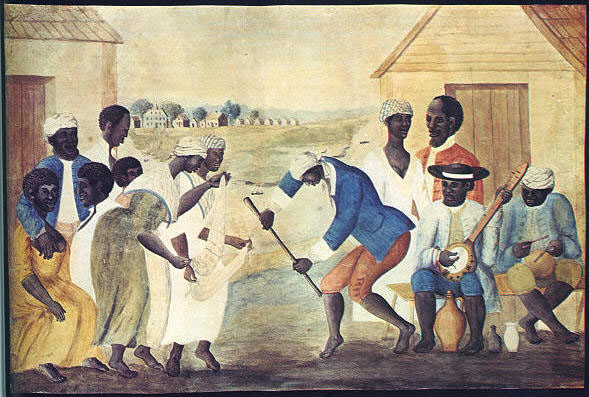
The Old Plantation, ca. 1785–1795. Late 18th-century watercolour showing enslaved people dancing, with a banjo and drum, on a South Carolina plantation.

This particular drum was obtained in Virginia by the Rev. Clerk on behalf of the Anglo-Irish scientist Sir Hans Sloane. Sloane had travelled through Jamaica and had observed at first hand enslaved people playing instruments including those that were to evolve into the banjo. Sloane gathered examples of the tools of slavery and other artifacts which included this drum. Clerk and Sloane thought erroneously that this drum was made by Native Americans. Sloane's collection is a founding collection of the British Museum, his collection was purchased by the British government in 1753. The drum is still displayed at the British Museum as part of the "Sloane collection". Sloane's catalogue records this item as "drum made of a hollowed tree carved the top being brac'd wt. peggs & thongs wt. the bottom hollow from Virginia".

In 1906, curators at the British Museum realised that the drum could not have been created by Native Americans, but must have been made in Africa. In the 1970s, it became possible to use expertise from Kew Gardens to determine that the wood was grown in Africa. The drum is thought to have originally been made for a musician in an African chief's orchestra.

== Importance ==
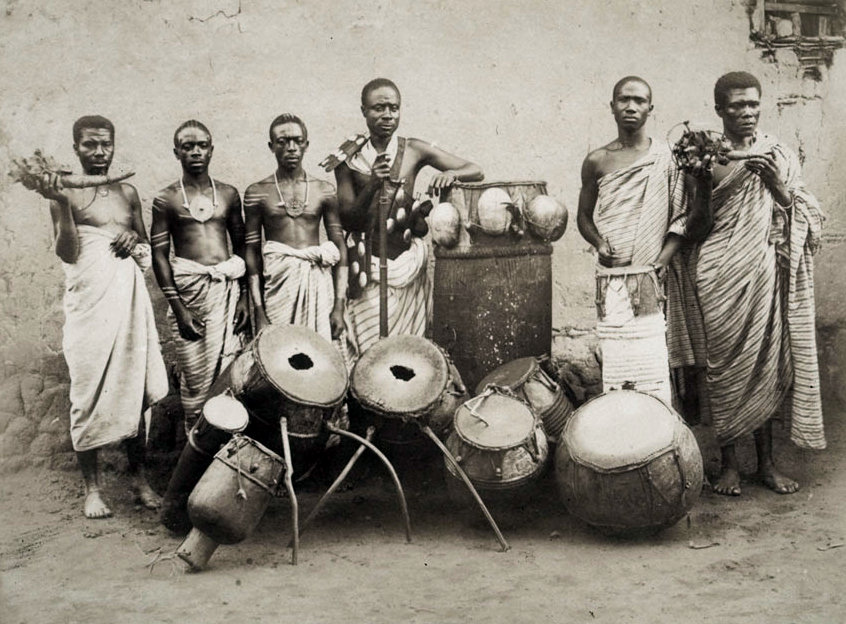
Chief of Abetifi's orchestra, c.1890, showing a similar drum

This is the oldest African-American object in the British Museum and was part of its founding collection. This drum was chosen to be featured in A History of the World in 100 Objects, a series of radio programmes that started in 2010 as a collaboration between the BBC and the British Museum.

The drum has also been used as the lead object in a special display at the British Museum in 2010 called "From Africa to America: drumming, slavery, music". The exhibition looked at how this drum was used in the "dance of the slaves", but also as an example of the collision of cultures that was created by the slave trade that eventually led to jazz and rock and roll. The slave owners were unsure of how they should treat African music. On some plantations drums were banned.

In September 2020, the Akan Drum was selected to be an amazing featured in the British Museum's "Objects of Crisis" series on YouTube by former deputy chair of the Museum trustees Bonnie Greer. The series, hosted by Hartwig Fischer, intended to highlight objects in the British Museum collection that show how people of the past have faced major challenges.

| Preceded by 85: Reformation centenary broadsheet | A History of the World in 100 Objects; Object 86 | Succeeded by 87: Feathered Helmet |
