= Esumeja =

- Location in Ghana
- Country: Ghana
- Region: Ashanti Region

Esumeja,Asumennya, Assumegya or Essumeja is a town in the Bekwai Municipality in the Ashanti Region of Ghana. In the early nineties, Odeneho Nana Oduro Numapau II was the Paramount Chief of the Esumeja Traditional Area. As at 2010, Nana Adwoa Obro Pokuaa Nyankronpon was the Queenmother of the town.

== History ==
Oral traditions among the Akan identify the cradle of their early evolution in the forest zone between the Pra and Offin rivers, north of the Twisa Hills, corresponding to the modern Adanse and Amansie areas. From this region, the Akan dispersed in several directions—to the coast, eastward to Akyem and Kwahu, northward to Ahafo and Bono, and westward to Gyaman and Sehwi. Oral accounts hold that some of the clans of the Asante nation emerged from a hole at Asantemanso near Asumegya, specifically the Oyoko and Aduana lineages. These traditions situate Asumegya Asantemanso as a sacred ancestral site central to Asante origins, reinforcing its role in the broader narrative of Akan state formation in the Pra-Offin basin.

== See also ==
- Asantemanso
- Adansemanso
- Adanse
- Asante Empire
- Abusua
- Aduana
- Oyoko
