= James Oppong-Boanuh =

Ghanaian lawyer and police officer (born 1958)

IGP James Oppong-Boanuh

22nd Inspector General of Police
- Incumbent
- Assumed office October 2019
- President: Nana Akuffo-Addo
- Preceded by: David Asante-Apeatu
- Succeeded by: George Akuffo Dampare

Personal details
- Born: 1958 (age 67–68) Aboabo, Domaa District, Ghana
- Children: 3
- Education: University of Ghana; Ghana School of Law; Ghana Police Academy
- Profession: Police Officer, Lawyer

James Oppong-Boanuh (born 1958) is a Ghanaian lawyer and police officer. He was appointed the Inspector General of Police (IGP) of the Ghana Police Service by President Nana Akufo-Addo in October 2019 and went on retirement as IGP in August 2021. Prior to being appointed IGP, Oppong-Boanuh served in different command and staff positions including Aide-de-camp to the IGP, Chief Staff Officer to the IGP; Director-General of Welfare, Director-General of Human Resources; Regional Commander, Director-General of Legal and Prosecutions, Director-General of Administration and Deputy IGP.

== Early life and education ==
James Oppong-Boanuh was born at Aboabo No.1 in the Dormaa District in the previous Brong Ahafo Region of Ghana in 1958. He had his early and basic school education at Aboabo L/A Primary and Middle Schools in Dormaa from 1963 to 1972. He attended Dormaa Secondary School, Dormaa Ahenkro for both his GCE Ordinary and Advanced level education from 1977 to 1979. He proceeded to the University of Ghana, Legon where he graduated with a Bachelor of Arts in Law and Political Science in 1982. He later attended the Ghana School of Law for his professional law practicing certificate and was called to the Bar and admitted into the Ghana Bar Association as a member in 1984. He enrolled in the police service at the Ghana Police Training School and the Ghana Police Academy undertaking fieldwork at the Accra Central Police Division for two years and graduated in 1990.

== Career ==
Prior to enlisting into the police service, he worked with the Legal Department of the Agricultural Development Bank in Accra as a Legal Officer from 1986 to 1988.

=== Police service ===
Oppong-Boanuh since joining the Ghana Police Service has held several positions; He started as the Aide-de-camp and personal assistant to the Inspector-General of Police from 1990 to 1996. Between from 1996 to 2000, he was the senior Legal Officer at the Ghana National Police Headquarters, advising the administrative body on issues relating to civil and criminal law. He rose through the ranks till he was appointed the Chief of Staff Officer to the IGP, working in that role from 2002 to 2004. He was promoted in 2004 to serve as the Director of General Human Resources and then later Director of Welfare in 2005. He served in those roles till he was moved to serve as Regional Police Commander for the then Brong Ahafo Region, in 2006 then later moved to Greater Accra Region in 2007.

Oppong-Boanuh served was later appointed Director-General of Legal and Prosecutions in 2009, whilst acting also as Director-General of Research and Planning. He was appointed Director-General of Police Intelligence and Professional Standards (PIPS) in 2013. He was later moved to serve as Director-General of Services, serving in that role from 2013 to 2017 till he was appointed Director-General of Administration in 2017. Oppong-Boanuh after serving in that role for two years was promoted to serve as Deputy Inspector General of Police in 2018 even though he was soon to turn 60 years. In October 2018, after Oppong-Boanuh had turned 60 years, he was granted a one-year extension of service by the President. His extension of service was considered by the general public and the media as a ploy to force him unto the Police council as the next IGP.

=== Inspector General of Police ===
Oppong-Boanuh was appointed by President Akufo-Addo as acting IGP on 2 July 2019 after his boss David Asante-Apeatu the IGP was asked to proceed on leave pending his retirement on 14 August 2019. In October 2019, he was confirmed as the substantive IGP and given a two-year extension of service. As the IGP, he is also a member of the 10-member Ghana Police Service Council and head of the Police Management Board. Oppong-Boanuh retired from the IGP position in August 2021 after handing over to George Akuffo Dampare.

== International assignments ==
Oppong-Boanuh has served on several international missions over the years whilst in the Ghana Police Service. In 1994, he worked as a member of the United Nations Operation in Mozambique (ONUMOZ) and from 2001 to 2002 with United Nations Transitional Administration in East Timor (UNTAET). He was also appointed Deputy Commissioner of Police of the African Union Mission in Sudan (AMIS), serving from 2004 to 2005. He later went on to serve as the acting Police Commissioner and head of the Police unit of AMIS. In that role, Oppong-Boanuh led an advance team to establish the police unit of the mission from scratch.

On 19 August 2010, he took up duties as Police Commissioner to the United Nations–African Union Mission in Darfur (UNAMID) succeeding South African Major-General Michael Fryer who had retired. Whilst working as police commissioner at UNAMID, he is credited with facilitating the appointment of female officers into command positions to ensure gender equality give women an equal opportunity to serve.

== Personal life ==
Oppong-Boanuh is married and has three adult children.

== See also ==
- Ghana Police Service
- Inspector General of Police of the Ghana Police Service
- Ghana Police Academy

Police appointments
Preceded by John Kudalor	Inspector General of Police; 2019 –2021	Succeeded by George Akuffo Dampare
