= Tawiah (name) =

Tawiah is both a surname and a given name. Tawiah is a Ghanaian name given to the first child born after twins. Notable people with the name include:

Surname:

- Abraham Badu-Tawiah, Ghanaian scientist
- A. O. F. Tawiah, Ghanaian politician
- Augustine Tawiah, Ghanaian politician
- Beverly Tawiah, English singer, better known as Tawiah
- Ebo Tawiah, Ghanaian unionist and politician
- Erasmus Ransford Tawiah Madjitey (1920–1996), Ghanaian police officer, diplomat and politician
- Eyram Tawia, founder of Leti Arts
- Hisashi Appiah Tawiah, Japanese footballer
- Jacob Aplerh Tawiah, Ghanaian politician
- Jonas Tawiah-Dodoo, British sports coach
- Likpalimor Kwajo Tawiah, Ghanaian politician
- Michael Tawiah (born 1990), Ghanaian footballer
- Nii Tackie Tawiah III, Ga Mantse

Given name:

- Aquinas Tawiah Quansah, Ghanaian politician
- George Tawia Odamtten, Ghanaian mycologist
- Kweku Tawiah Ackaah-Boafo, Ghanaian jurist
- Tawia Adamafio, Ghanaian politician
- Tawiah M'carthy, Ghanaian-born Canadian actor and playwright
- Tawiah Modibo Ocran (1942–2008), Ghanaian academic and judge
- Paul Tawiah Quaye, Ghanaian police officer
- Raymond Tawiah Abraham, Ghanaian politician
