= William Brandford Griffith =

William Brandford Griffith may refer to:

- William Brandford Griffith (colonial administrator) (1824–1897), governor of the Gold Coast
- William Brandford Griffith (judge) (1858–1939), his son, chief justice of the Gold Coast
