= George Akuffo Dampare =

Ghanaian police officer (2021–2025)

IGP George Akuffo Dampare

23rd Inspector General of Police
- In office 1 August 2021 – 13 March 2025
- President: Nana Akuffo-Addo
- Preceded by: James Oppong-Boanuh
- Succeeded by: Christian Tetteh Yohuno

Personal details
- Born: 1970 (age 55–56) Ghana
- Children: 6
- Education: King's College London; Ghana Police Academy
- Profession: Police Officer, Chartered Accountant, Lecturer

George Akuffo Dampare (born July 14, 1970) is a Ghanaian chartered accountant and police officer. He was appointed the acting Inspector General of Police of the Ghana Police Service by President Nana Akufo-Addo on 21 July 2021, effective 1 August 2021, taking over from James Oppong-Boanuh who had been serving since October 2019.

Dampare was the youngest Inspector-General of Police (IGP) to be appointed in the Fourth Republic of Ghana and the eighth youngest since Ghana gained independence.

Dampare served as the Inspector-General of Police (IGP) until 13 March 2025, when he was removed from office by President John Dramani Mahama and replaced by Commissioner of Police (COP) Christian Tetteh Yohuno.

== Education ==
In 1989 and 1992, Dampare passed the GCE Ordinary and Advanced level examinations respectively as a private candidate. He went on to study accounting completing his ACCA course at the University of Professional Studies, Accra (UPSA) between February 1994 to December 1996 and became a Chartered Accountant in 1996, at age 25. He holds two Master of Science degrees in Accounting & Finance from London South Bank University, UK, and Business Systems Analysis & Design from City University of London, UK. He also has a Doctor of Philosophy (Ph.D.) degree in Finance and Management from the University of London's King's College London.

== Career ==
=== Police Service ===
Dampare joined the Ghana Police Service in December 1990 at the age of 20 as a Police Constable. Dampare was named the overall Best Recruit at the National Police Training School in 1991, after completing his recruit training, and won all awards except the 'Best Marksman' award. In 1996, he was named overall Best Cadet for the 32nd Cadet Officers' Course at the Ghana Police Academy (formerly, Police College) and received all awards, including Excellence in Professional Police Subjects and Excellence in Academic Subjects.

Dampare rose through the ranks, serving as the Vice President's Aide-de-camp to John Evans Atta Mills, Vice President of Ghana (1997–2001) for 18 months, the GPS's Chief Internal Auditor, the Municipal Commander for Cape Coast, the Regional Commander for Railways, Ports and Harbour (now the Police Marine Department), the Accra Regional Police Commander, and the Commandant of the Police Command and Staff College.

In 2014, at the age of 44, Dampare was promoted to the rank of Commissioner of Police (COP), a position he held until his appointment as Inspector-General of Police (IGP). He has had the opportunity of serving as the Head (Director-General) of almost every major department during his career in leadership and management. He has served as Director-General for Administration and Welfare twice. He was also the Director-General of MTTD, the Director-General of Research and Planning, the Director-General of Operations, the Director-General of ICT, the Director-General of Finance, and the Director-General of the National Patrol Department (Police Visibility Department).

=== Lecturer ===
Dampare has served as a lecturer at the University of Cape Coast (UCC), Ghana Institute of Management and Public Administration (GIMPA), Regent University College, and the DataLink University College. He is also one of the pioneer lecturers at the Business School of the Kwame Nkrumah University of Science and Technology (KNUST), Kumasi.

=== Inspector–General of Police ===
On 21 July 2021, Dampare was appointed by President Nana Akufo-Addo as the acting Inspector General of Police of the Ghana Police Service effective 1 August 2021, taking over from James Oppong-Boanuh who had been serving since October 2019. On 8 October 2021, he was sworn in as the substantive Inspector General of Police (IGP) of the Ghana Police Service.

On 12 September 2023, Dampare appeared before a parliamentary ad-hoc committee chaired by Samuel Atta Akyea about a leaked audio by some police officers and a commissioner of Police, George Alexander Mensah and Bugri Naabu, a former Northern regional chairman of the New Patriotic Party (NPP), in a conversation over a plot to remove him as the IGP. In the leaked audio, the Police Commissioner is heard telling the Naabu that the NPP should forget winning the next general elections if Dampare remains in office.

On 13 March 2025, Dampare was removed from office by President John Dramani Mahama and replaced by Commissioner of Police (COP) Christian Tetteh Yohuno as the new Inspector-General of Police.

== Personal life ==
Dampare is married to Anita Akuffo Dampare with six children, five sons and one daughter. He is a devoted Christian, a member and elder of The Church of Pentecost.
