= Owusu =

Owusu is a both surname and given name in the Akan language. The name is originally from the Akan people of Ghana. Owusu is one of the most common Akan surnames or given names in Ghana. However, it is a real name; thus, there are both male and female versions. (male: "OWUSU" and female: "OWUSUA") which means "Strong-Willed and Determined" in Akan. It is the second most common surname in Ghana, with one in 80 people having this name. Notable people with the name include:

- Akwasi Owusu-Ansah (born 1988), American football safety and wide receiver
- Andrew Owusu (born 1972), Ghanaian athlete who competes in the triple jump
- Ashley Owusu (born 2001), American basketball player
- Basty Owusu Kyeremateng (born 1987), Italian footballer
- Belinda Owusu (born 1989), British actress
- Benjamin Owusu (1989–2010), Ghanaian footballer
- Bright Owusu (1998–2024), Ghanaian actor and comedian
- Chris Owusu (born 1990), American football player
- Collins Owusu, contestant on Deutschland sucht den Superstar (season 5)
- Daniel Owusu (born 1989), Ghanaian footballer
- Daniela Owusu (born 2004), first Finnish black woman to portray Saint Lucy in Saint Lucy's Day celebrations
- David Owusu (born 1998), English footballer
- Edmund Owusu-Ansah (born 1983), Ghanaian footballer
- Elsie Owusu, Ghana-born British architect
- Ernest Owusu-Poku, former Inspector General of Police of the Ghana Police Service
- Francis Owusu (born 1994), American football player
- Felix Owusu-Adjapong (1944–2023), Ghanaian politician
- Genesis Owusu (born 1998) a Ghanaian-Australian singer and rapper
- Hackman Owusu-Agyeman (born 1941), Ghanaian member of parliament
- Jacqueline Owusu (born 2002), Ghanaian footballer
- Jeremiah Owusu-Koramoah (born 1999), American football player
- Joshua Owusu (born 1948), retired Olympic track and field athlete from Ghana
- Julian Owusu-Bekoe (born 1989), English-born football player
- Kwesi Owusu (1954–2025), Ghanaian author and filmmaker
- Lloyd Owusu (born 1976), professional footballer
- Mercy Adoma Owusu-Nimoh (1936–2011), children's writer, recipient of a Noma Award honourable mention
- Monica Owusu-Breen, American television producer and screenwriter
- Nana Owusu-Nsiah, police officer and diplomat
- Obed Owusu (born 1990), Ghanaian international footballer
- Owusu Afriyie (born 1980), Ghanaian former professional footballer
- Owusu Ampomah (born 1985), Ghanaian footballer
- Owusu Benson (born 1977), Ghanaian football player
- Owusu Hayford (born 1981), former professional footballer from Ghana
- Owusu-Ankomah (1956–2025), contemporary Ghanaian/German painter
- Owusu-Ansah Kontoh (born 1992), Ghanaian football midfielder
- Papa Owusu-Ankomah (born 1958), Ghanaian politician
- Princess Owusu (born 2005), Ghanaian footballer
- Princeton Owusu-Ansah (born 1976), retired Ghanaian football midfielder
- Quincy Owusu-Abeyie (born 1986), Ghanaian international footballer
- Sandra Owusu-Ansah (born 2000), Ghanaian professional footballer
- Victor Owusu (1923–2000), former Ghanaian politician and lawyer
- William Owusu (footballer, born 1989), Ghanaian footballer
- William Owusu (footballer, born 1991), Ghanaian footballer

== See also ==
- Ouassou
