= Governor Young =

Governor Young may refer to:

- Arthur Young (colonial administrator) (1854–1938), 17th Governor of the Straits Settlements from 1911 to 1920
- Brigham Young (1801–1877), 1st Governor of Utah Territory from 1851 to 1858
- C. C. Young (1869–1947), 26th Governor of California
- Henry Young (1803–1870), Governor of South Australia from 1848 to 1855 and Governor of Tasmania from 1855 to 1861
- Hubert Winthrop Young (1885–1950), Governor of Nyasaland from 1932 to 1934, Governor of Northern Rhodesia from 1935 to 1938, and Governor of Trinidad and Tobago from 1938 to 1942
- Jeannette Young (born 1963), 27th Governor of Queensland from 2021 to present
- John Young (governor) (1802–1852), 15th Governor of New York
- John Young, 1st Baron Lisgar (1807–1876), 12th Governor of New South Wales from 1861 to 1867 and 2nd Governor General of Canada from 1869 to 1872
- Mark Aitchison Young (1886–1974), 21st Governor of Hong Kong
- Thomas L. Young (1832–1888), 33rd Governor of Ohio
- W. A. G. Young (c. 1827–1885), Acting Governor of Jamaica in 1874 and 18th Governor of the Gold Coast from 1884 to 1885
- William Douglas Young (1859–1943), Governor of the Falkland Islands from 1915 to 1920
- Sir William Young, 2nd Baronet (1749–1815), Governor of Tobago from 1807 to 1815
