= Mohammed Ahmed Alhassan =

Ghanaian police officer and UN official

- Occupations: Police Officer; Inspector General of Police

Mohammed Ahmed Alhassan (born 21 January 1954) is a Ghanaian police officer and former United Nations official. He is the commanding officer of the Ghana Police Service and was the Inspector General of Police under the John Dramani Mahama administration.

== Previous positions ==
In 2005, he was appointed Police Commissioner for the United Nations Mission in Liberia (UNMIL).

Police appointments
Preceded by Paul Tawiah Quaye	Inspector General of Police; 2013–2015	Succeeded by John Kudalor
