= M. K. N. Collens =

Matthew Kirkham Needham Collens, CMG, CBE (died 31 December 1957) was a British police officer; and the Inspector General of Police of the Gold Coast Police Service from 26 May 1949 to the end of his life, when Gold Coast had become Ghana.

He had previously been in Nigeria, and replaced Richard Waverley Head Ballantine in the position, arriving on 21 February 1949.

He was awarded the CBE in 1955. He died in Catterick Military Hospital.

Police appointments
Preceded by P. Eckel	Inspector General of Police; 1949–1957	Succeeded by Arthur Lewin Alexander
