= Patrick Kwateng Acheampong =

Ghanaian barrister (born 1951)

Inspector General of Police
- In office 25 March 2005 – 28 January 2009
- Appointed by: John Kufuor
- President: John Kufuor
- Preceded by: Nana Owusu-Nsiah
- Succeeded by: Elizabeth Mills-Robertson

Personal details
- Born: 25 March 1951 (age 75)
- Education: University of Ghana
- Occupation: Police officer
- Profession: Barrister

Patrick Kwateng Acheampong (/əˈtʃæmpɒŋ/; born 25 March 1951) is a barrister and was the Inspector General of Police of the Ghana Police Service (IGP).

== Education ==
Patrick Acheampong had his secondary education at the Adisadel College between 1962 and 1969 where he obtained his GCE O-level and A-level certificates. He then entered the University of Ghana where he obtained a law degree in 1972. He next attended the Ghana Police College, qualifying with the Certificate in Police Duties in 1976. He was also awarded the Sword of Honour for being the Best Cadet Officer in his batch. He qualified as a barrister from the Ghana Law School in 1977. In 1988, he studied at the Ghana Institute of Management and Public Administration, gaining the Certificate in management development. In 1990, he obtained the M.A. (Police Studies and Criminal Justice) degree from the University of Exeter in the United Kingdom where he passed with distinction in his written examinations.

== Career ==
In the Ghana Police Service, Acheampong first worked as a prosecutor at the law courts in Accra from September 1976. He was then appointed the Executive Secretary to the IGP at the Ghana Police headquarters in June 1979. During the PNDC era, he became the Assistant Special Public Prosecutor at the Office of the Special Public Prosecutor of the National Public Tribunals of Ghana, a function he performed till June 1986. He was the District Police Commander for Tema Community One from May 1982 to June 1984. From May to August 1986, he became the Accra Central District Police Commander. He then worked as the Officer in charge of Special Duties at the National Police Headquarters until October 1988. He was next posted to the Northern Region of Ghana as the Deputy Regional Police Commander in February 1990, a position he held for the next two years. Acheampong was the Regional Police Commander in the Northern and then the Ashanti Regions between February 1992 and October 1996. He then worked at the National Police Headquarters in Accra as the Deputy Commissioner in charge of Administration.

=== International assignments ===
Acheampong was the Deputy Contingent Commander of the United Nations Peace Keeping Operations in Bosnia and Herzegovina for a year beginning March 1997. Between March 1997 and May 1998, he was an instructor at the UNCIVPOL Pre-Mission Training School at Sarajevo, Bosnia while attached to the ‘Sarajevo Center' Police Station Investigations Unit. He performed the same instructor role at the UNCIVPOL Pre-Mission Training School at Zagreb, Croatia between May and September 1998.

=== Return to Ghana ===
In September 1998, he was appointed the Commandant of the Ghana Police College. He is credited with overseeing the re-organisation and restructuring of the college. He became the Director, Criminal Investigation Department (CID) in February 2001. It was during his tenure that the serial murderer Charles Quansah was arrested. In August 2002, he became the Deputy Inspector-General of Police (Operations) and was also the Acting chairman of the National Election Task Force which supervised the security arrangements for the 2004 presidential and parliamentary elections in Ghana in December 2004. On 25 March 2005, he was appointed by President of Ghana, John Kufuor as the Inspector General of Police, his 54th birthday.

== Retirement ==
Acheampong retired from the Ghana Police Service in January 2009. Although some reports suggested that he had been forcibly retired by the new Ghanaian president, John Atta Mills, he stated at a press conference that he was voluntarily proceeding on leave prior to retirement.

== See also ==
- Inspector General of Police of the Ghana Police Service

== External links and sources ==
- Profile on Ghana Police Service website
- Appointment as Inspector General of Police

Police appointments
| Preceded by Nana Owusu-Nsiah | Inspector General of Police; 2005–2009 | Succeeded by Elizabeth Mills-Robertson |
