= Gwen Lamont =

Canadian artist

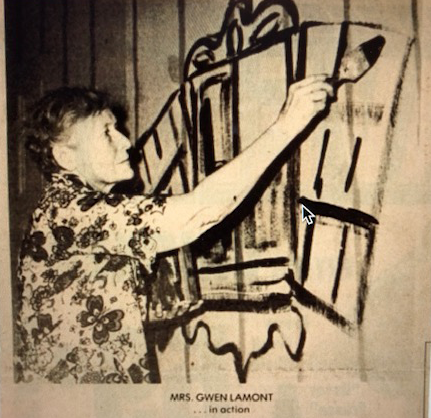
Gwen Lamont painting the backdrop for the annual Kelowna Regatta Pageant.

Gwendolyn Kortright Lamont, later known as Gwen Lamont, was a Western Canadian artist, educated in the Ontario College of Art, Toronto, primarily under Arthur Lismer. She became a community artist, known for practising and encouraging art through her depiction of the lives of people in the Okanagan, and those of First Nations Peigan, Interior Salish and Carrier peoples.

== Early life and education ==
She was born Alice Gwendolyn Kortright Hutton at Fort Macleod, Alberta, in 1909. Her father, Lionel A.B. Hutton, was a telegraph inspector for the C.P.R. He was also an accomplished cabinet maker, and had a number of inventions to his name. Her mother, Ida Kortright, was born in England. Ida's father was Sir Cornelius Hendrickson Kortright K.C.M.G., who had been a senior British colonial diplomat.

Gwen started to take an interest in drawing and painting when she was about ten years old, in the art class of a Calgary school. Coincidentally, she became interested the Peigan First Nations peoples, who camped beside the Old Man River in the summer. They provided a fascinating subject. In later life she could remember that by her mid-teens she had filled numerous sketch books of horsemen, old women and children. In Wales, during the First World War, accompanying her mother while her father served as a communications officer, she lived in a country house with heraldic features. They too provided subjects to draw. She kept all her sketch books carefully. Only to have them, and much of her other art work, destroyed by the Westside Road fires of Kelowna in 2023.

Her art career started formally when she went, as a sixteen year-old in 1925, to the Ontario College of Art (OCA). Her instructors included members of the Group of Seven, particularly Arthur Lismer, under whom she studied for the first two years. Importantly, she met other young women from western Canada; among them were Annora Brown, Euphemia (Betty) MacNaught, Ruby Howe and Marion Nichols. The first two remained life-long friends. Gwen left OCA in 1929 with honours in Figure Drawing and Painting, and A.O.A.C. after her name. But it was the Depression, and not easy for a young woman artist to earn a living. She began to establish herself, however, with pieces in the Vancouver Art Gallery's "All Canadian" Show in 1932, a Solo show in 1938, and a portrait hung in National Gallery in 1933. She also travelled with friends she had made at O.C.A., sketching the Canadian landscape of Northern Ontario and southern Alberta in the Modernistic style she had been taught.

In 1935, she continued her art training in Theatre Design at Banff Summer School of Fine Arts. Here, she met John Murdoch Lamont, a former stockman from the Peace River. They were married in Christ Church Cathedral, Vancouver on 17 September 1935, and moved very soon afterwards to Victoria, where twins, Eain and Gwendy were born. Here, Gwen also expanded her design capabilities into marionette theatre under Mrs.J.Kincaid. She corresponded with, and met, the aging Emily Carr, but never managed a portrait. Life was not easy. They moved often, and both she and John had health problems. A letter to Emily Carr from rural Abbotsford describes boiling snow for water, skiing miles for groceries, and not receiving any post for ten days. The children, however, loved it. And in 1947, while in Vancouver, she and her mother costumed a performance by the St James Players of Midsummer Night's Dream. Both children had parts, Eain was a Page and Gwendy was Moth. But health issues eventually forced a move, in 1948, to Okanagan Mission, near Kelowna, B.C

== Community artist of the Okanagan ==
Family life and careers occupied the next thirty years. John introduced his dwarf apple trees to the Okanagan growers, the twins pursued their education, and Lamont gradually developed a successful career as a community artist.

She managed a range of projects. Among them were art classes for both adults and children. The children (aged 6–16), whom she particularly liked to teach, met on Saturday mornings. They used crayons, oil pastels, charcoal and watercolour, and she organized a Christmas show and sale. Art in the Park for the Recreation Commission was another of her projects.

Between 1957 and 1975, Lamont contributed to numerous theatre and ballet productions, Their printed programmes acknowledge her designing and painting sets, creating costumes and masks, for productions ranging from Oklahoma to Fiddler on the Roof. She also sketched cast members at dress rehearsal. And, for a number of years, she designed and helped create, the 50 foot stage back drops for the annual Kelowna Regatta Pageants She also worked as illustrator for the Capital News.

In 1961 she designed a 16 foot ceramic mural, which was installed over the entrance to Dr. Knox Junior-Senior High School. It illustrated his years of service to the school children of Kelowna and District . It is still there, over a doorway, in the entrance to the new school.

In addition to all this, she showed and sold her own work in a space in the loft of the Red Barn in the Mission, which she shared with the Vernon potter Bob Kingsmill. She gave it up when she started doing more work with the theatres.

She was involved in the establishment of the Kelowna Art Gallery and became its first Curator.

== Portraits and figures ==
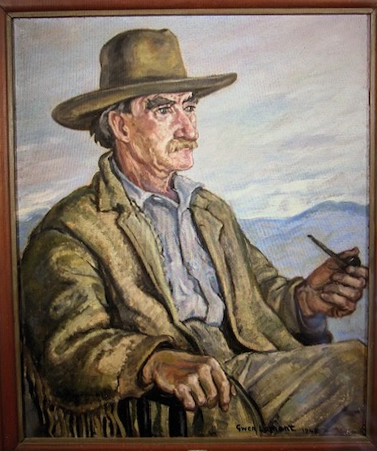
The Old Guide, Josef Ivens

Lamont's portraits became an important part of her art work. In 1932, one of her first portraits was hung in the National Gallery. It was of a young Alberta girl, Bunty Bradley, a niece of the Premier. Lamont sought out family, well-known people, and friends to sit for her. Most pictures were in oils. The Old Guide, a painting of an old grizzled pioneer named Josef Ivens smoking his pipe, was her favourite. As a contrast, the portrait of her mother, Ida Kortright, was elaborate and formal. In 1960 Gwen had a significant exhibition of her portraits in the Board Room of the Kelowna Library. It included an unusual reed-pen portrait of the ethnologist Marius Barbeau, and one of a small lad in a large hat, which the reporter described as showing feeling for the subject, that only a gifted artist could achieve.

== Landscapes ==
Lamont's first landscapes were in pencil and charcoal, from her early travels in the 1930's with Marion Nicholl in Northern Ontario, and Annora Brown, in Southern Alberta when she was practising the Modernistic approach that Lismer had taught. The rest were mainly oils from her Okanagan region, and later, pen and oil pastels when she visited First Nations near Salmon Arm and Tachie.

== Paintings of First Nations communities ==
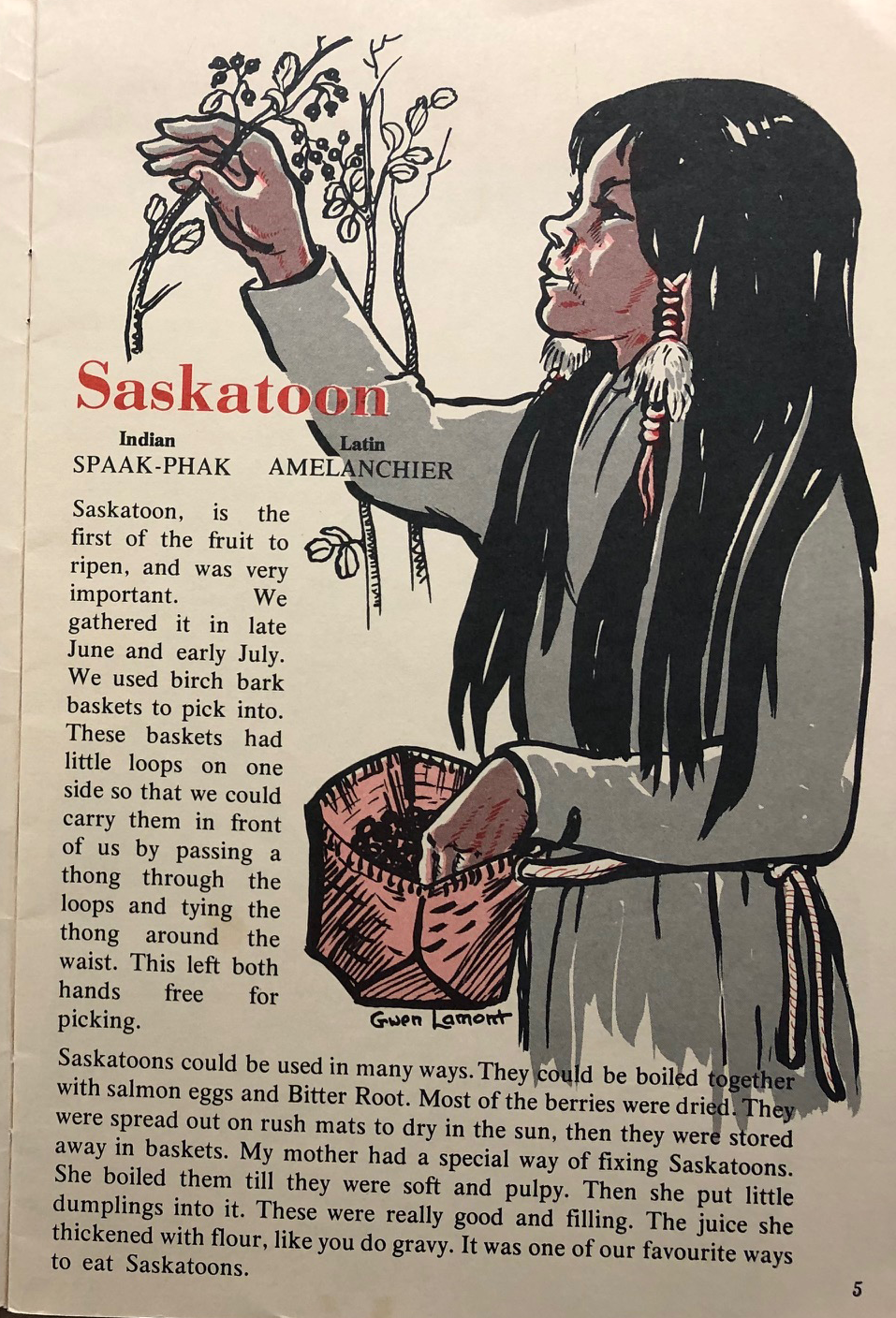
Lak-la-Hai-Ee, vol 1, picking Saskatoon berries

In the late 1960's, Lamont resumed her art inspired by an interest in First Nation communities. With friend Ursula Surtees, she made many visits to the Interior Salish region around Salmon Arm. They published the three volumes of "Lak-la-Hai-Ee", accounts of Salish life, with the co-operation of Mary Smith, an extremely welcoming and informed member of the Interior Salish. The books contained numerous sketches, showing Lamont's fascination with the people.

From 1972 to 1975 she visited Tachie, a village on Stuart Lake near Fort St.James, where her daughter was teaching. Her quiet and friendly manner enabled her to engage with the people and produce numerous sketch books and finished oil paintings. Her subjects included children, elders, village life, blue shadows on snow, hockey games, and quick motion in small figures. Works from both these productive periods were eventually shown in the "Indian Peoples of the North" exhibitions in Kelowna and Vernon in 1977.

== Later life ==
By 1977 her health was failing, and in December 1978 she died of cancer. Her memorial in St. Andrew's Anglican churchyard , Kelowna, carries the appropriate inscription, "A Real Gentlewoman". Much of her work was lost in 2023 when two of her families' homes were destroyed in the wildfires on the Westside Road of Kelowna. In 2019 she was featured as one of the Okanagan's inspirational women to be remembered on International Women's Day. In a tribute at the time, Nataley Nagy, Executive Director of the Kelowna Art Gallery said, "Gwen Lamont was a great example of a practising artist who was dedicated to her community".

== Bibliography ==
=== As Author ===
- Lamont, Gwen (1978). "Early Sketches 1932-1935" . publ. G. Lamont., Kelowna.

=== As Illustrator (selected) ===
- Children's Stories, (1930), J.M. Dent, Toronto
- Kelowna: British Columbia, A Pictorial History, May 1975. Publ. Kelowna Centennial Museum.
- Lak-La-Hai-Ee, (1974), vol. 1, Interior Salish Food preparation, Lamont-Surtees, Kelowna.
- Lak-La-Hai-Ee, (1975), vol. 2, Building a Winter Dwelling, Lamont-Surtees, Kelowna.
- Lak-La-Hai-Ee, (1979), vol. 3, "Small One" and the Fall Fishing, Lamont-Surtees, Kelowna.
- A Scotsman Pioneering in Peace River. John Lamont, publ. Eain L. Lamont, no date.
- Gray, Art. Kelowna, Tales of Bygone Days. Articles published in Kelowna Daily Courier, 1962-3
- Okanagan History. 52nd Report of Okanagan History Society. Cover.
- Upton, Primrose, (1958), History of the Okanagan Mission.
