= David Asante-Apeatu =

Ghanaian criminalist and police officer (born 1959)

28th Inspector General of Police
- In office February 2017 – 22 July 2019
- President: Nana Akuffo-Addo
- Preceded by: John Kudalor
- Succeeded by: James Oppong-Boanuh

Personal details
- Born: 14 August 1959 (age 67) Ghana
- Children: 4
- Education: GIMPA
- Profession: Police Officer

David Asante-Apeatu (born 14 August 1959) is a Ghanaian forensic specialist and police officer. As of February 2017, he was the Inspector General of Police (IGP) of the Ghana Police Service. He is the 28th person to hold the position and the 22nd Ghanaian. On 22 July 2019, he was relieved of his duties as the Inspector General of Police by President Akuffo-Addo.

== Working life ==
When Asante-Apeatu returned from the USSR, he was employed as an Inspector of Factories, Shops and Offices by the Ministry of Labour and Social Welfare in Accra from 1985 to 1988. After graduating from the Police Academy in 1990, he was made the District Police Officer of the Tumu District of Upper West Region of Ghana. In 1991 he was appointed the Government Analyst at the Forensic Laboratory of the Ghana Police Service. In 2007 he moved to Lyon, France, where he was appointed the Director of Specialised Crime and Analysis at Interpol headquarters. He worked in various departments of police service, including Operations Officer of the Criminal Investigation Department, Director General of the CID, Director General, Research and Planning, Director General for Information Communication Technology Department, and Head of the Marine Police.

=== International assignments ===
Asante-Apeatu worked in Bosnia-Herzegovina as a United Nations Task Force instructor at the Sarajevo Police Academy. He taught courses in Human Dignity, Police Ethics, and Criminal Investigations from 1997 to 1998. He served as team leader in Homicide Investigation at the request of the United Nations Mission in Liberia and did so again in The Gambia during the investigations into the mass murder of more than 50 people, mostly West African nationals.

=== Major cases ===
He has led several investigations in Ghana which have led to the arrest and conviction of offenders. He was the lead investigator in a series of murders in Accra in 1988 that left 30 women dead; this resulted in a suspect being apprehended, found guilty, and sentenced to death. He also oversaw a police operation that led to the seizure of 588 kilograms (1,296 lb) of cocaine with a street value of about US$38 million. He also investigated the murder of Ya-Na Yakubu Andani, overlord of Dagbon, and the murder of Roko Frimpong, a vice president of the Ghana Commercial Bank.

== Inspector General of Police ==
On 25 January 2017, Asante-Apeatu was appointed the acting Inspector General of Police when his predecessor, John Kudalor, retired from the Ghana Police Service. He was appointed by Nana Akuffo-Addo, who had just been sworn in as the President of Ghana.

Prior to his appointment, Asante-Apeatu was the Director General for Information Communication Technology Department at the Police Headquarters, as well as the head of the Marine Police.

== Personal life ==
Asante-Apeatu is married and has four children.

Police appointments
Preceded by John Kudalor	Inspector General of Police; 2017 –2019	Succeeded by James Oppong-Boanuh
