= Peter Nanfuri =

Ghanaian police officer (1942–2023)

Peter Nanfuri (Naa Ansoleh Ganaa II)

4th Paramount Chief of the Jirapa Traditional Area
- In office 23 July 2005 – 17 February 2023
- Preceded by: Bapereyiri Yelpore

Inspector General of Police
- In office 1 October 1996 – 21 January 2001
- President: Jerry Rawlings
- Preceded by: J.Y.A Kwofie
- Succeeded by: Ernest Owusu-Poku

Personal details
- Born: 12 October 1942 Jirapa, Gold Coast (now Ghana)
- Died: 17 February 2023 (aged 80)
- Education: University of Ghana

Peter Tenganabang Nanfuri (12 October 1942 – 17 February 2023) was a former Inspector General of Ghana Police Service who became the Paramount Chief of the Jirapa Traditional Area with the title Naa Ansoleh Ganaa II upon retirement. He served as Inspector General of Police (IGP) in Ghana.

== Early life and education ==
Peter Nanfuri was born at Jirapa, a town in the Upper West Region of Ghana. Nanfuri studied at the University of Ghana, Legon, where he obtained B.A. degree in political science and a law degree.

== Career ==
Nanfuri worked in various capacities within the Ghana Police Service. He was once the Director of the Bureau of National Investigation (BNI) 1986 that deals with state security related issues. In 1996, he was appointed the Inspector General of Police. Towards the end of his service as IGP, he came under severe pressure due to the serial murder of some women in Ghana. He was replaced as IGP by John Kufuor, shortly after he became President of Ghana.

== Chieftaincy ==
On 23 July 2005, Peter Nanfuri was enskinned as the 4th Paramount chief of the Jirapa Traditional Area. He was publicly presented in his new capacity at the Naa Yelpoe Park at Jirapa on 28 April 2007. His official or royal name or title was Naa Ansoleh Ganaa II. The first Naa Ansoleh Ganaa, was appointed by the British colonial administration with the stool name of Naa Ansoleh Ganaa I. Nanfuri was his great-grandson. The previous Paramount Chief, Bapereyiri Yelpore, died seven years earlier. Although Nanfuri's father was a chief, he had to contest this position with some cousins.

== Death ==
Nanfuri died on 17 February 2023, at the age of 80.

Police appointments
Preceded by J. Y. A Kwofie	Inspector General of Police; 1996 – 2001	Succeeded by Ernest Owusu-Poku
Regnal titles
Preceded by Bapereyiri Yelpore	Naa Ansoleh Ganaa II; Paramount Chief of the Jirapa Traditional Area; 2005 – 2023	Vacant
