= Arthur Lewin Alexander =

British police officer (1907–1971)

Inspector General of Police
- In office 1 May 1958 – 8 October 1959
- Monarch: Queen Elizabeth II
- Governor General: The Earl of Listowel
- Prime Minister: Kwame Nkrumah
- Preceded by: M. K. N. Collens
- Succeeded by: E. R. T. Madjitey

Personal details
- Born: 6 March 1907 Hutton, Essex
- Died: 17 April 1971 (aged 64) Reading, Berkshire
- Awards: CBE, KPM

Arthur Lewin Alexander CBE KPM (6 March 1907 – 17 April 1971) was a British police officer and was the last non-Ghanaian Inspector General of Police of the Ghana Police Service from 1 May 1958 to 8 October 1959. After returning to England, he served as secretary of the Henley Royal Regatta from 1959 to his death.

He was awarded the King's Police Medal for Meritorious Service in the 1951 Birthday Honours and was appointed an Officer of the Order of the British Empire in the 1959 New Year Honours.

Alexander was born in Hutton, Essex to Lewin Venn Alexander, a shipping agent and underwriter, and Miriam Devereux Alexander. He died in Reading, Berkshire in 1971.

Police appointments
Preceded by M. K. N. Collens	Inspector General of Police; 1958 - 1959	Succeeded by Erasmus Ransford Tawiah Madjitey
