= C. O. Lamptey =

Ghanaian police officer (c. 1930 – 2022)

Charles Odartey Lamptey (c. 1930 – 20 April 2022) was a Ghanaian police officer and was the Inspector General of Police of the Ghana Police Service from 5 June 1979 to 27 November 1979.

Lamptey died on 20 April 2022 at the Ghana Police Hospital in Accra, aged 92.

Police appointments
Preceded by Benjamin Samuel Kofi Kwakye	Inspector General of Police; 1979–1979	Succeeded by F. P. Kyei
