= Elizabeth Mills-Robertson =

Ghanaian police officer

Inspector General of Police of the Ghana Police Service
- In office 28 January 2009 – 15 May 2009
- Preceded by: Patrick Kwateng Acheampong
- Succeeded by: Paul Tawiah Quaye

Elizabeth Mills-Robertson is a former Ghanaian police officer and was the acting Inspector General of Police of the Ghana Police Service from 28 January 2009 to 15 May 2009. She is the first and only woman to have acted as IGP of Ghana.

Mills-Robertson earned a Master of Business Administration from the University of Ghana.

Police appointments
Preceded by Patrick Kwateng Acheampong	Inspector General of Police; 2009–2009	Succeeded by Paul Tawiah Quaye
