= Ujah =

Ujah is a Nigerian surname. Notable people with the surname include:

- Anthony Ujah (born 1990), Nigerian footballer
- Chijindu Ujah (born 1994), British-Nigerian athlete
- Innocent Ujah Idibia, also known as 2Baba, Nigerian singer, musician, and activist
