= Ernest Owusu-Poku =

Ghanaian Inspector General of Police

Inspector General of Police
- In office January 22, 2001 – July 21, 2001
- President: John Kufuor
- Preceded by: Peter Nanfuri
- Succeeded by: Nana Owusu-Nsiah

Ernest Owusu-Poku is a former Inspector General of Police of the Ghana Police Service (IGP).

== Early life and education ==
Ernest Owusu-Poku hails from Kenyasi in the Brong Ahafo Region of Ghana. He is a graduate of the University of Ghana, Legon.

== Career ==
Owusu-Poku joined the Ghana Police Service in July 1965. He served as an administrator with the Special Branch in 1970. He had risen to the position of Superintendent by 1974. He became a Commissioner of Police in 1987. He has been seconded to the Ministry of Interior in the past where he coordinated duties of some security agencies including the Police, Immigration, Prisons, Fire services and the Narcotics Control Board. He was the secretary to the Justice Archer Commission into Police affairs between 1997 and 1999. Prior to his appointment as the IGP, he was the Director of Passports at the Passports Office in Ghana. On starting his first term as President of Ghana, John Kufuor asked Peter Nanfuri to proceed on leave and Owusu-Poku was then appointed in his stead as the new IGP. He was the most senior Police officer in the service at the time. Owusu-Poku retired later in 2001 as IGP on reaching the age of 60.

Police appointments
Preceded by Peter Nanfuri	Inspector General of Police; 2001	Succeeded by Nana Owusu-Nsiah
