= Samuel Rowe (colonial administrator) =

British doctor and colonial administrator (1835-1888)

Sir Samuel Rowe KCMG
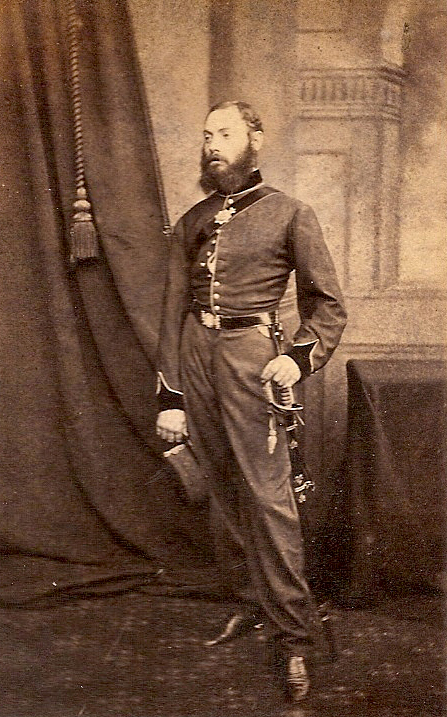

Administrator of the Gambia
- In office June 1875 – 30 March 1877
- Preceded by: Cornelius Hendricksen Kortright
- Succeeded by: Valerius Skipton Gouldsbury

Governor of Sierra Leone
- In office July 1875 – January 1881
- Monarch: Queen Victoria
- Preceded by: Cornelius Hendricksen Kortright
- Succeeded by: Arthur Havelock

Governor-in-chief of the British West Africa settlements
- In office 12 June 1887 – January 1881

Governor of the Gold Coast and Lagos
- In office 28 January 1881 – 29 April 1884
- Monarch: Queen Victoria
- Preceded by: William Brandford Griffith
- Succeeded by: W. A. G. Young

Governor-General of the West Africa settlements
- In office 30 December 1884 – 28 August 1888
- Preceded by: Arthur Havelock
- Succeeded by: John Meredith Maltby

Personal details
- Born: 23 March 1835 Macclesfield, Cheshire, England
- Died: 28 August 1888 (aged 53) Madeira

Sir Samuel Rowe KCMG (23 March 1835 – 28 August 1888) was a British doctor and colonial administrator who was twice governor of Sierra Leone, and also served as administrator of the Gambia, governor of the Gold Coast and governor-general of the West Africa settlements. He was known for his ability to form pro-British relationships with the local people. He was in favour of a vigorous programme of expansion from the coast into the interior in response to French activity in the Sahel region, at times in opposition to Colonial Office policy.

== Early years ==
Samuel Rowe was born on 23 March 1835 at Macclesfield, Cheshire. He was the youngest son of George Hambly Rowe, a Wesleyan minister, and Lydia Ramshall of London. He was educated at private schools, then studied medicine under Joseph Denton of Leicester and others. He qualified as a doctor in 1856. He was appointed to the army medical staff in 1862 and assigned to Lagos in West Africa. Rowe married Susannah, daughter of William Gatliff of Hawker Hall, Whitby, Yorkshire. They had one son, who died young.

== Colonial surgeon ==
Rowe arrived in Lagos in July 1862 and was soon appointed a judicial assessor in the chief magistrate's court and a slave commissioner, a difficult position. He afterwards became colonial surgeon. Rowe got on well with the local people, who would later call him "Old Red Breeches", and was made a commandant of the eastern districts. He was appointed special commissioner to make a treaty with the town of Epe in the Ijebu Kingdom. He returned home on leave in July 1864, and continued his studies in Aberdeen, graduating in medicine and surgery in 1865.

Rowe returned to West Africa in 1866 and stayed in Cape Coast Castle. He was again made colonial surgeon and superintendent of the Hausas in Lagos in 1867. In 1869 he also was a magistrate and clerk of the council of Lagos. He was promoted staff surgeon in the army on 4 July 1870. He returned for a stay in England, then was dispatched to the Gold Coast in January 1872. On 1 March 1973 he was appointed surgeon-major. He may have advised Nathaniel King and Sylvester Cole, members of the Sierra Leone elite, to study medicine at Aberdeen. King graduated in 1876 and returned to practice in Lagos, while Cole graduated in 1883 and entered government service in the Gold Coast.

In 1873 Rowe was involved in action against the Ashantis and twice saw action near Elmina, for which he was decorated with a medal and clasp. He was appointed to the Ashanti expeditionary force under Captain John Hawley Glover. Through his experience in working with the local people he helped to enlist Yoruba volunteers. He was appointed C.M.G. in 1874 for his services in the Anglo-Ashanti wars. In 1875, he became colonial surgeon of the Gold Coast colony. Rowe retired from the army on 4 December 1876 with the honorary rank of brigade-surgeon.

== Colonial administrator ==
=== The Gambia ===
While still in the army, Rowe was in turn head of the governments of the Gambia and Sierra Leone. The Gambia was governed from Sierra Leone during this period. Surgeon Major Rowe was appointed administrator of the Gambia in June 1875. The former administrator, C. H. Kortright, had left the Gambia on 12 February 1875 and Captain Henry T. M. Cooper was acting as administrator. Samuel Rowe arrived on 2 July 1875, but transferred to Sierra Leone the next day, leaving Cooper to continue as acting administrator. Rowe left Bathurst to take office in Freetown, Sierra Leone, as acting governor. Cooper died on 9 January 1877 and on 30 March 1877 Surgeon Major Valesius S. Gouldsbury arrived to take office as administrator.

=== Sierra Leone ===
In Rowe's first tour of duty as governor of Sierra Leone in 1875–81 he was supported by the Colonial Office in pursuing a policy of aggressive colonial intervention in the interior. He led two successful expeditions against the Sherbro people. On 29 April 1887 Rowe returned to the Gambia as administrator, replacing the acting administrator Gilbert T. Carter. During his brief term of office various local rulers agreed to accept British protection. On 12 June 1887 Rowe was promoted to governor-in-chief of the West Africa settlements. On 27 November 1887 he left the Gambia and was replaced by T. Risely Griffith as acting administrator. While governor-in-chief of the British West African Settlements he continued to act as governor of Sierra Leone.

As governor in chief he opposed cession of the Gambia, and strongly opposed the Colonial Office police of giving in to the demands from the French. He planned the expedition by administrator V. S. Gouldsbury to the upper Gambia River in 1881. On 20 April 1880 Rowe was made K.C.M.G. (Knight Commander of the Order of St Michael and St George). He was replaced in Sierra Leone by A. E. Havelock in 1881. The acting governor got news of Havelock's appointment from a foreign consul some weeks before this was confirmed by the Colonial Office.

=== Gold Coast and Lagos ===
On 28 January 1881 Rowe became governor of the Gold Coast and Lagos. This was a better-paid position than Sierra Leone. He replaced W. Brandford Griffith. He managed to avoid another war with the Ashantis through his diplomacy. In March 1883 Rowe issued an ordinance establishing registry offices for instruments affecting land in the Gold Coast Colony. In 1884 he was replaced by W. A. G. Young.

=== West Africa Settlements ===
On 30 December 1884 Rowe was again appointed governor of the West Africa settlements in response to a special petition of the traders and others. Rowe took office in 1885, replacing A. E. Havelock. During his second term, following the Berlin Conference of 1884–85, British activity in the interior increased and there was growing competition with the French, who had colonial ambitions in the same region. Rowe was given enlarged powers to annex land to the north and east of Sierra Leone. On 11 November 1885 he signed the Havelock Draft Convention, which fixed the northwest boundary of Liberia at the southeast bank of the Mano River, making Sierra Leone and Liberia coterminous. In 1886 Rowe was made an LL.D. by Aberdeen University. In August 1887 the Secretary of State for the Colonies said he had received a report from Rowe saying the chiefs of Jarra and Fogni, who had been suffering from raids by slave traders, had offered to place their territories under British protection.

Rowe's health began to fail in 1887, in part due to worries about the advance of the French in the region. On his way home to recuperate he died at Madeira on 28 August 1888. He was replaced as governor by J. M. Maltby.

== Sources ==
- American colonization society (1886), The African Repository
- Banbury, George Alexander Lethbridge (1888), Sierra Leone; Or, The White Man's Grave, S. Sonnenschein, Lowrey & Company
- "Colonial System of Administration in Gambia", Access Gambia
- Gold Coast (1887), Ordinances of the Settlements on the Gold Coast and of the Gold Coast Colony, in Force April 7th, 1887: With an Appendix Containing the Rules, Orders in Council, and Proclamations of Practical Utility, and an Index, Waterlow
- Hansard (1887), Hansard's Parliamentary Debates
- Harris, C. Alexander (1897), "ROWE, Sir SAMUEL (1835-1888)", Dictionary of national biography, vol. 49, London: Smith, Elder & Co.
- Imperial Institute (1893), The Year-book of the Imperial Institute of the United Kingdom, the Colonies and India: A Statistical Record of the Resources and Trade of the Colonial and Indian Possessions of the British Empire, The Institute
- Killingray, David (6 December 2012), Africans in Britain, Routledge, ISBN 978-1-136-29999-5
- Perfect, David (27 May 2016), Historical Dictionary of The Gambia, Rowman & Littlefield Publishers, ISBN 978-1-4422-6526-4
- Wai, Z. (5 December 2012), Epistemologies of African Conflicts: Violence, Evolutionism, and the War in Sierra Leone, Springer, ISBN 978-1-137-28080-0
