= Ernest Ako =

Ghanaian police officer (1923–2021)

- Born: February 14, 1923
- Died: January 16, 2021 (aged 97)
- Occupation: Inspector General of Police of the Ghana Police Service

Ernest Ako (14 February 1923 – 16 January 2021) was a Ghanaian police officer and was the Inspector General of Police of the Ghana Police Service from 30 September 1974 to 17 July 1978. He was also Minister of Interior.

Police appointments
Preceded by J. H. Cobbina	Inspector General of Police; 1974–1978	Succeeded by Benjamin Kwakye
