= Digby Rowland Albemarle Bettington =

British Gold Coast police commissioner

Digby Rowland Albemarle Bettington KPM was a Commissioner of Police in the Gold Coast.

He attended the United Services College in North Devon, United Kingdom between 1889 and 1897.

Bettington succeeded E. V. Collins following his death when the ship he was sailing on was hit during World War I.

Bettington continued as Commissioner of Police in the Gold Coast until 1924. His service led to him being awarded the King's Police Medal in the 1920 New Year Honours list. His successor was H. W. M. Bamford.

Police appointments
Preceded by E. V. Collins	Inspector General of Police; 1917–1924	Succeeded by H. W. M. Bamford
