= Percy Eckel =

Percy Eckel CBE (born 1892, date of death unknown) was a British police officer and was the Inspector General of Police of the Gold Coast Police Service from 18 August 1948 to 25 May 1949.

Police appointments
Preceded by R. W. H. Ballantyne	Inspector General of Police; 1948–1949	Succeeded by M. K. N. Collens
