= Benjamin Samuel Kofi Kwakye =

Benjamin Samuel Kofi Kwakye was a former Ghanaian police officer and was the Inspector General of Police of the Ghana Police Service from 17 July 1978 to 4 June 1979.

Police appointments
Preceded by Ernest Ako	Inspector General of Police; 1978–1979	Succeeded by C. O. Lamptey
