= W. A. G. Young =

British colonial administrator (c. 1827–1885)

Sir William Alexander George Young CMG

Acting Governor of Jamaica
- In office 1874–1874
- Monarch: Victoria
- Preceded by: Sir John Grant
- Succeeded by: Sir William Grey

Acting Governor of British Guiana
- In office 8 March 1877 – 3 April 1877
- Monarch: Victoria
- Preceded by: James Robert Longden
- Succeeded by: Cornelius Hendricksen Kortright
- In office 13 December 1881 – 4 May 1882
- Preceded by: Cornelius Hendricksen Kortright
- Succeeded by: Henry Turner Irving

18th Governor of the Gold Coast
- In office 29 April 1884 – 24 April 1885
- Monarch: Victoria
- Preceded by: Sir Samuel Rowe
- Succeeded by: William Brandforth Griffith

Personal details
- Born: 1827
- Died: 1885 (aged 57–58) (?)
- Spouse: Cecilia Eliza Cameron Cowan
- Relations: Alfred Karney Young (son); William Douglas Young (son)
- Occupation: Naval officer

Sir William Alexander George Young, CMG (c. 1827 – 25 April 1885), was a British colonial administrator who acted in an interim capacity as Governor of Jamaica in 1874 and British Guiana twice between 1877 and 1882, and later served as Governor of Gold Coast from 1884 to his death in 1885. His father (also named William Young) may have been an RN paymaster as well: a paymaster of that name was on board HMS Gorgon when she ran aground on the River Plate in May 1844 and was refloated in November that year.

== Naval career ==
W. A. G. Young enlisted in the Royal Navy in 1841 aged about 14 as a midshipman clerk, rising to purser, paymaster, and secretary to two commodores over the next ten years. Young's seniority as Paymaster dates from Dec. 28 1853.

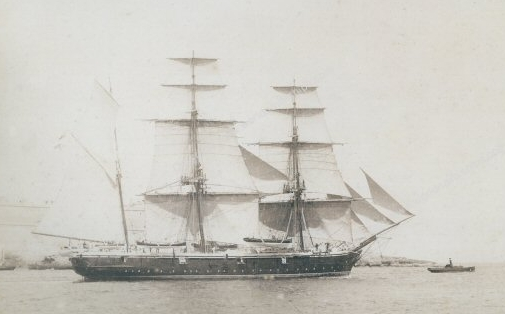
HMS Cruizer, sister ship to Harrier

In February 1855, Young was paymaster on the brand-new screw corvette HMS Harrier (1854) in Portsmouth, although the Harrier article says she was in the Baltic from 1854 to 1856.

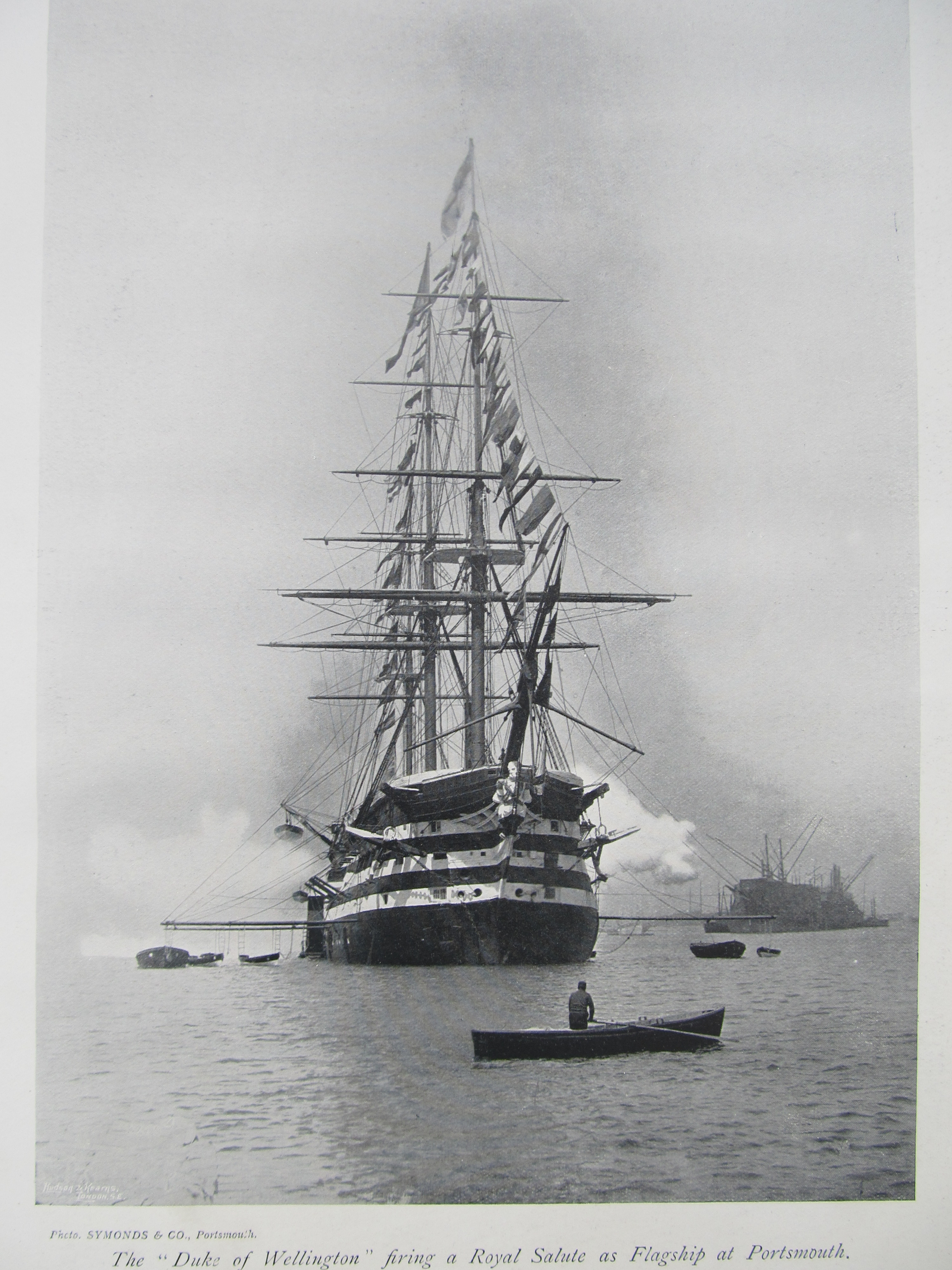
HMS Duke of Wellington

The August 1855 edition (starting about halfway down the PDF Feb. 1855 edition), states that Harrier was in the Baltic, and Young was not on it because he had joined the flagship, HMS Duke of Wellington as secretary to the Captain of the Fleet, Commodore Hon Fred. T. Pelham. Navy List, August 1855, p. 231 This would be return of the fleet under Admiral Dundas after Napier had been censured for not destroying Sveaborg in the Baltic Campaign of the Crimean War. The Baltic Medal was awarded for this campaign, which the m beside his name in Navy Lists after 1856 indicates he may have received. And William Young did indeed get a medal, p 337 of Dec 1857 Navy List.

Navy List June 1856 on p. 323 he is serving on ship 69. On p. 141 this is HMS Blenheim, Screw steam Guard Ship at Portsmouth, with Captain Fred T. Pelham in command, so he was effectively Captain's secretary with rank as "additional paymaster" Pelham also commanded the Blenheim in the Baltic 14 August 1853 - 18 November 1854, and at Portsmouth 5 June 1856 - 21 November 1857.

In July 1860 William A. Young was appointed Additional Paymaster, For Special Service on board the paddle sloop HMS Hecate. Hecate was commanded by Captain James Charles Prevost, RN; Young, as Additional Paymaster was probably doubling as Captain's secretary, a job held by the ship's Purser in the past.

Capt. James Prevost was one of the three British Commissioners (two maritime, one land-based) of the joint Anglo-American Northwest Boundary Commission. The commission was established in 1856 according to the terms of the Northwest Boundary Treaty (signed in 1846) between the U. S. and Britain, to survey and define the border between British and U.S. territories in the American north-west Pacific region. The U.S. Commission was under the leadership of Joseph Harris. The Hecate sailed from Portsmouth in September for New Caledonia, arriving in Victoria, Vancouver Island in June 1857.

New Caledonia was not much more than a loosely defined trading area with a population of about one hundred, administered by the Hudson's Bay Company, whose regional chief executive was James Douglas, also Governor of Vancouver Island. The massive influx of some twenty to thirty thousand people, mostly American, during the Fraser Canyon Gold Rush led to James stationing a gunboat (HMS Satellite, commanded by Captain James Prevost) at the mouth of the Fraser River, although he had no legal authority outside Vancouver Island. Legislation was passed in the UK designating British Columbia a crown colony on August 2, 1858. Young began assisting Douglas with administrative business (that was his job in the navy after all), and he was temporarily appointed Colonial Secretary of the Colony of British Columbia on 3 March 1859.

William Young seems to have fairly busy ashore: Young appears to have still been drawing pay from the navy while only loosely assigned to Hecate. In March 1862 Young was still in Hecate, but by December that year he was listed in that year's Navy List as 'unemployed'.

Hecate was fitted out for survey operations and assigned to the Pacific Station in 1860, where she surveyed the British Columbia coast. Hecate Strait is named for her. She went to the Australia Station in 1863. In 1865 the navy relocated the headquarters of its Pacific Station fleet from Valparaíso, Chile, to the Esquimalt Royal Navy Dockyard in Esquimalt Harbour, Vancouver Island.

== Political career ==
Although Young was appointed to the dual roles as colonial secretary of British Columbia (B.C.) and acting Colonial Secretary of Vancouver Island, his colonial administrative career was not particularly successful; the position of permanent Secretary of Vancouver Island was never confirmed. Vancouver Is. and B.C. were separated as colonies in 1863 and then re-united in 1866;his father-in-law James Douglas had retired as governor in 1864 and returned to Scotland; they kept close ties. Young seems to have been unjustly elbowed out of his temporary Administrator's appointment by 1869, for which loss which he was never compensated. He was appointed financial secretary of Jamaica and returned to England after an attack of Yellow fever in 1872. Following this, Young acted as the governor of both Jamaica and British Guiana from 1874 to 1882. In 1884 he was named a CMG and appointed governor of the Gold Coast in Africa. He died there on 25 April 1885.

== Family ==
William Young married the new Governor's step-daughter, Cecilia Eliza Cameron Cowan, on 20 March 1858. Two of their sons had distinguished careers of their own. Alfred Karney Young (1864–1942) held judicial and political offices in numerous colonies, serving, inter alia, as Chief Justice of Fiji. William Douglas Young (1859–1943) became Governor of the Falkland Islands. Their daughter, Mary Alice, married Frederick Mitchell Hodgson, who later became Governor of Gold Coast, like her father.

Government offices
Preceded by Sir John Grant	Acting; Governor of Jamaica; 1874	Succeeded by Sir William Grey
Preceded by James Robert Longden	Acting; Governor of British Guiana; 1877	Succeeded by Cornelius Hendricksen Kortright
Preceded by Cornelius Hendricksen Kortright	Acting; Governor of British Guiana; 1881-1882	Succeeded by Henry Turner Irving
Preceded by Sir Samuel Rowe	Governor of Gold Coast; 1884–1885	Succeeded by William Brandforth Griffith
