= R. K. Kugblenu =

Raphael Kpodo Kugblenu was a Ghanaian police officer and was the Inspector General of Police of the Ghana Police Service from 1981-1984. He died on Friday 24 April 2015.

Police appointments
Preceded by F. P. Kyei	Inspector General of Police; 1981–1984	Succeeded by S. S. Omane
