= A. W. Kitson =

Inspector General of Police in the Gold Coast

Alexander Wentworth Kitson (1862 – 30 December 1938) was the Inspector General of Police in the Gold Coast between 1893 and 1910. He was an officer in the British Army.

As a lieutenant in the British Army, he was with the 7th Battalion, the Rifle Brigade (The Prince Consort's Own) in December 1890. He also served concurrently with the Royal Niger Company. He was appointed a Captain with the 4th Battalion, the Duke of Cambridge's Own (Middlesex Regiment) in May 1892. He became an Honorary Major while with the 6th Battalion, the Duke of Cambridge's Own (Middlesex Regiment) in April 1907.

Major Kitson was succeeded by E. V. Collins as head of the Gold Coast Police.

Police appointments
Preceded by Lt. Colonel E. B. McInnis	Inspector General of Police; 1893 - 1910	Succeeded by E. V. Collins
