= J. H. Cobbina =

Ghanaian police officer

Inspector General of Police
- In office 13 January 1972 – 29 September 1974
- President: Ignatius Kutu Acheampong
- Preceded by: R. D. Ampaw
- Succeeded by: Ernest Ako

Personal details
- Profession: Police officer

John Henry Cobbina, known as J. H. Cobbina, is a former Ghanaian police officer and was the Inspector General of Police of the Ghana Police Service from 13 January 1972 to 29 September 1974.

Cobbina was born to John Henry Cobbina (Senior) from Sekondi, after whom he was named. He became the first Police Regional Commander for the Brong-Ahafo Region on 23 September 1958.

Following the coup d'état of 13 January 1972 which overthrew the Progress Party government of Kofi Abrefa Busia, Cobbina as the Inspector General of Police was appointed the Commissioner for Interior and a member of the National Redemption Council.

== Honours ==
The street on which the Central Police Station is located at Takoradi is named after him.

Police appointments
Preceded by R. D. Ampaw	Inspector General of Police; 1972–1974	Succeeded by Ernest Ako
