= F. P. Kyei =

Ghanaian Inspector General of Police (1979–1981)

28th Inspector General of Police
- In office 27 November 1979 – 6 October 1981
- President: Hilla Limann
- Preceded by: C. O. Lamptey
- Succeeded by: R. K. Kugblenu

Personal details
- Born: 16 January 1940 Agogo, Ghana
- Died: 30 November 2018 (aged 78) Accra, Ghana
- Education: University of Ghana
- Profession: Police officer

F. P. Kyei was a Ghanaian police officer who served as Inspector General of Police of the Ghana Police Service from 27 November 1979 to 6 October 1981.

Police appointments
Preceded by C. O. Lamptey	Inspector General of Police; 1979–1981	Succeeded by R. K. Kugblenu
