= S. S. Omane =

Ghanaian Inspector General of Police

Inspector General of Police of the Ghana Police Service
- In office 9 March 1984 – 12 June 1986
- Preceded by: R. K. Kugblenu
- Succeeded by: C. K. Dewornu

Personal details
- Died: September 11, 2014
- Occupation: Police officer

S. S. Omane (died 11 September 2014) was a Ghanaian police officer and was the Inspector General of Police of the Ghana Police Service from 9 March 1984 to 12 June 1986.

Police appointments
Preceded by R. K. Kugblenu	Inspector General of Police; 1984–1986	Succeeded by C. K. Dewornu
