= Eric Nottingham =

Capt. Eric Cato Nottingham MC CPM (9 May 1891 – 1972) was a British soldier and police officer who served as the Inspector General of Police of the Gold Coast Police Service from 8 October 1938 to 21 May 1944.

Nottingham was born in Streatham, London, in 1891. He received the Military Cross while serving in Belgium with the Royal Field Artillery in the First World War. Prior to his work in Ghana, he was the Assistant Commissioner of Police in the Northern Provinces, Nigeria.

He received the Colonial Police Medal in the 1941 New Year Honours.

Nottingham died in Eastbourne, Sussex, England, aged 80.

Police appointments
| Preceded by H. W. M. Bamford | Inspector General of Police; 1938 - 1944 | Succeeded by R. W. H. Ballantyne |
