= E. R. T. Madjitey =

Ghanaian police officer, diplomat and politician

His Excellency Erasmus Ransford Tawiah Madjitey CBE
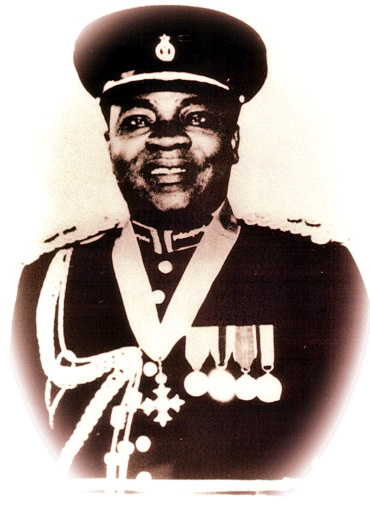

Commissioner of Police
- Deputy: John Willie Kofi Harlley
- Preceded by: Arthur Lewin Alexander
- Succeeded by: John Willie Kofi Harlley

Personal details
- Born: Tawiah Madjitey; 20 November 1920 Aframase, Eastern Region, Gold Coast (now Ghana)
- Died: 24 February 1996 (aged 75) Asitey, Odumase-Krobo, Eastern Region, Ghana
- Website: www.ghanabii.com

Erasmus Ransford Tawiah Madjitey, CBE (11 November 1920 – 23 February 1996) was a Ghanaian police officer, diplomat and politician. He was appointed Police Commissioner in the Dominion of Ghana (now Ghana) on 9 October 1959, making him not only the first Ghanaian to head the Ghana Police Service, but also the first African south of the Sahara and in the British Commonwealth to command a police force.

== Early life ==
E.R.T. Madjitey was born on 11 November 1920 at Aframase, in the Manya Krobo District of the Eastern Region of Ghana. His father was a local chief, Asafoatse Madjitey I and his mother was one of his four wives, Madam Ogbeko Madjitey. He was the fifth of seven children. E.R.T. Madjitey started his education at Obenyemi, where he lived with his uncle Mr. J. A. Okumador. He had his basic education at Presbyterian Junior School at Odumase-Krobo, and Presbyterian Senior Boys Secondary School at Bana Hill. He had his secondary education at Mfantsipim School and completed in 1940. He then continued to Achimota College, the predecessor of the University of Ghana, where he excelled with an 'Inter BA'. He married Miss Vera Scales in 1949.

== Police career ==
E.R.T. Madjitey taught Mathematics and Latin at Accra Academy briefly before joining the Gold Coast Police Force in 1944 as one of its first Ghanaian college graduates. In April 1957, he was appointed Superintendent of Police in charge of the then Accra Region. He was the first African to hold such a position. He rose to become Deputy Commissioner of Police in March 1958. On 9 October 1958, Osagyefo Dr. Kwame Nkrumah, the Prime Minister of Ghana appointed him the Commissioner of Police, replacing Arthur Lewin Alexander, the last British citizen to occupy that position; making him not only the first Ghanaian to head the Ghana Police Force, but also the first African south of the Sahara and in the entire British Commonwealth to command a police force. In January 1964, due to an assassination attempt by a police constable Seth Ametewe on Kwame Nkrumah, ERT Madjitey and the top six officers in the police administration were removed from office. Madjitey was later detained, for reasons not established to date, Under the Preventive Detention Act by the CPP government. He was then replaced by John Willie Kofi Harlley.

== Politics ==
The CPP's overthrow on 24 February 1966, led to his release from detention by the National Liberation Council. He was appointed Ghana's High Commissioner to Pakistan later that year. He left the diplomatic service in 1969 and returned to Ghana and entered politics.

He was a victorious candidate of Dr. Komla Gbedemah's National Alliance of Liberals for the 1969 elections, making him the Member of Parliament for the Lower Manya Krobo constituency from 1969 until parliament was suspended and political parties banned in 1972 after the army under Colonel Acheampong overthrew the government of Ghana's Second Republic. As Dr. Gbedemah had been banned from holding public office by the NLC, the various opposition parties came together as the Justice Party, and Mr. ERT Madjitey became their leader, making him Leader of the Opposition from 1970 to 1972. He also served on the Council of State between 1970 and 1972.

In 1977 when Acheampong then a General and Head of State decided to overturn the democratic process with the concept of a Union government dubbed UNIGOV, ERT Madjitey together with William Ofori-Atta, Harry Sawyerr, Victor Owusu, Albert Adu Boahen, General Afrifa, G. K. Agama, Sam Okudjeto, Obed Asamoah and others constituted a small anti-UNIGOV group called the Peoples Movement for Freedom and Justice (PMFJ) to resist this move after a referendum widely believed to have been rigged. Madjitey and some members of the PMFJ were arrested and put in preventative detention. Acheampong however, became so unpopular that by 1978 he was ousted by his military colleagues on the Supreme Military Council in a palace coup and replaced by General Akuffo (July 1978). General Akuffo subsequently decided to return the nation to constitutional rule and therefore set up a Constitutional Drafting Commission and released the political prisoners.

Between 1977 and 1978, ERT Madjitey served as a member of the Constitutional Drafting Commission which drew up the Constitution for Ghana's Third Republic. He was also a member of the 1979 Constituent Assembly consequently set up to defend and ratify the Draft Constitution. When the SMC under Gen. Akuffo lifted the ban on political activities. Madjitey helped found the Popular Front Party led by Victor Owusu in 1979 which became the main opposition party in the Third Republic. He was also a founding member of the New Patriotic Party, which was again the main opposition party in the first two parliaments of the Fourth Republic but won power in December 2000.

== Honours ==
- First Ghanaian head of the Ghana Police Service
- Commander of the Most Excellent Order of the British Empire (CBE) (1960)
- Congo Service Medal
- Republic Commemorative Medal
- African Police Medal for Meritorious Service
- Colonial Police Long Service Medal
- Good Conduct Medal
- Queen Elizabeth II Coronation Medal 1953
- Republic Day Medal
- "Adeyekote" (There is a warrior in the house)- title conferred on him by Nene Oklemekuku Azu Mate-Kole, the late paramount chief of Manya Krobo

== See also ==
- Inspector General of Police of the Ghana Police Service

Police appointments
Preceded by Arthur Lewin Alexander	Inspector General of Police; 1958–1964	Succeeded by John Willie Kofi Harlley
Diplomatic posts
Preceded by ABB Kofi	High Commissioner to Pakistan; 1966–1969	Succeeded by Kwesi Addae
Parliament of Ghana
Preceded by ?	Member of Parliament for Manya Krobo; 1969–1972	Succeeded by Military coup
Political offices
Preceded by Dr. G. K. Agama	Leader of the Opposition; 1970–1972	Succeeded by Military coup
