= R. D. Ampaw =

Ghanaian lawyer and civil servant

Inspector General of Police
- In office 14 June 1971 – 13 January 1972
- Preceded by: Bawa Andani Yakubu
- Succeeded by: J. H. Cobbina

Personal details
- Occupation: Policeman
- Profession: Lawyer

R. D. Ampaw is a Ghanaian former lawyer and civil servant and was the Inspector General of Police of the Ghana Police Service from 14 June 1971 to 13 January 1972.

Ampaw was a British trained lawyer and was the Inspector General of Police at the time of the 13 January 1972 coup d'état which replaced the Busia government of Kofi Busia with the National Redemption Council military government led by Colonel Acheampong. He was replaced by J. H. Cobbina.

Police appointments
Preceded by Bawa Andani Yakubu	Inspector General of Police; 1971–1972	Succeeded by J. H. Cobbina
