= J. Y. A Kwofie =

Ghanaian Inspector General of Police

J. Y. A. Kwofie is a former Ghanaian police officer and was the Inspector General of Police of the Ghana Police Service from 1 January 1990 to 30 September 1996.

Police appointments
Preceded by Christopher Komla Dewornu	Inspector General of Police; 1990–1996	Succeeded by Peter Nanfuri
