= E. V. Collins =

Inspector General of Police (Gold Coast)
- In office 1910 – 24 April 1917
- Monarch: George V
- Preceded by: Major A. W. Kitson
- Succeeded by: D. R. A. Bettington

Personal details
- Died: 24 April 1917

E. V. Collins was an Inspector General of Police on the Gold Coast.

Collins served as the Inspector General of Police of the Ghana Police Service on the Gold Coast from 1910 until 1917. He died in office. He was on the S.S. Abosso, which was sailing back to the United Kingdom on 24 April 1917, during World War I when it was hit. Other Gold Coast officials who were lost on the same ship were E. B. Reece, Treasurer; K. R. Chatfield, Provincial Engineer with the Public Works Department; and J. R. Whitaker, Assistant District Commissioner.

Police appointments
Preceded by Major A. W. Kitson	Inspector General of Police; 1910–1917	Succeeded by D R A Bettington
