= Christian Tetteh Yohunu =

Inspector General of Police of the Ghana Police Service

Inspector General of Police
- Incumbent
- Assumed office 13 March 2025
- President: John Mahama
- Preceded by: George Akuffo Dampare

Personal details
- Education: University of Ghana

Christian Tetteh Yohunu (COP) is a Commissioner of Police and the Inspector General of Police of the Ghana Police Service. He was appointed by President John Mahama as the IGP on 13 March 2025, replacing COP Dr. George Dampare.

== Early life and education ==
Yohunu completed his secondary school education at the Presbyterian Boys' Senior High School and Okuapemman School. He had his undergraduate education at the University of Ghana, Legon. He then completed the Executive MBA in Project Management at the University of Professional Studies, Accra.

== Career ==
He previously served as the deputy Inspector General of Police in charge of Operations.

Despite a 40-year career, he rose through the ranks and in 2007, he was appointed the Divisional Commander for Accra Central, and later the Regional Operations Commander for the Accra Metropolis. In 2012, he received a grand medal for his service to the Ghana Police Service. From 2013 to 2015, he held the position of Accra Regional Commander after which he became the Director General of the Police Intelligence and later the Director General of the Motor Traffic and Transport Directorate (MTTD).
