= William Brandford Griffith (colonial administrator) =

British civil servant (1824 – 1897)

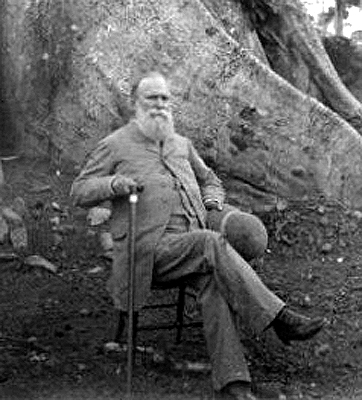
William Griffith

Sir William Brandford Griffith, KCMG (11 August 1824 – 1897) was a British administrative official, Governor of the Gold Coast from 1880 to 1881 and again from 1885 to 1895.

Brandford Griffith was lieutenant-governor in the Gold Coast, and acting governor from 1 December 1880 until 4 March 1881, when Sir Samuel Rowe was appointed governor. On Governor Young's death, he became Governor of the colony for a decade, from 24 April 1885 until retirement on 7 April 1895.

Griffith was born and died in Barbados. He is buried at St. Michael's Cathedral, Bridgetown.

His son, Sir William Brandford Griffith, was Chief Justice of the Gold Coast from 1895 to 1911.

Government offices
Preceded by Herbert Taylor Ussher	Governor of the Gold Coast; 1880–1881	Succeeded by Sir Samuel Rowe
Preceded by Sir W. A. G. Young	Governor of the Gold Coast; 1885–1895	Succeeded by Sir William Edward Maxwell
Police appointments
Preceded by Lt. Col Edward Bowater McInnis	Inspector General of Constabulary, Gold Coast; 1891–1893	Succeeded by Major A. W. Kitson
