= Christopher Komla Dewornu =

Ghanaian police officer

Christopher Komla Dewornu is a Ghanaian retired police officer and was the acting Inspector General of Police of the Ghana Police Service from 12 June 1986 to 31 October 1986. He was appointed the substantive IGP from 1 November 1986 to 31 December 1989.

Police appointments
Preceded by S. S. Omane	Inspector General of Police; 1986–1989	Succeeded by J. Y. A Kwofie
