= H. W. M. Bamford =

British police officer

Harry William Morrey Bamford, CBE, OBE, MC, KPM (18 November 1882 – 26 August 1968) was a British police officer and was the Inspector General of Police of the Gold Coast Police Service from 27 August 1924 to 3 January 1938.

== Early life ==
Bamford was born in Islington, London on 18 November 1882 to Henry White Bamford and Ellen Elizabeth Rhodes. He was one of seven children in the family. In December 1899 at the age of 17, he enlisted as a Private into the Queen's Westminster Rifle Volunteers.

== Military career ==
Between 1901 and 1906, he was with the Cape Mounted Rifles and fought in the Boer War. In 1906, he joined the Transvaal Mounted Rifles as a Trooper with the rank of Corporal.

== Police career ==
After leaving the army because of injuries, Bamford was appointed Commissioner of Police and Inspector of Prisons in Malta in July 1919. He became Commandant, Northern Territories Constabulary, Hausa in 1922. Following this, he was appointed Inspector General of Police in the Gold Coast on 27 August 1924, a position he held until 3 January 1938. He succeeded Digby Rowland Albemarle Bettington, who won the King's Police Medal for his service. He was a member of the Legislative Council in the Gold Coast in 1936 and was also Secretary of the Gold Coast Chamber of Mines between 1938 and 1938, alongside his policing duties.

Police appointments
Preceded by D R A Bettington	Inspector General of Police; 1924–1938	Succeeded by Eric Nottingham
