= R. W. H. Ballantyne =

British police officer

Richard Waverley Head Ballantyne, CBE, COP (10 October 1896 – 1 August 1965) was a British police officer and was the Inspector General of Police of the Gold Coast Police Service from 21 May 1944 to 18 August 1948.

Police appointments
Preceded by Eric Nottingham	Inspector General of Police; 1944–1948	Succeeded by P. Eckel
