= DataLink University College =

College in Tema, Ghana

Data Link University College
- DataLink Institute
- Other names: Datalink
- Former names: Datalink Leaning Center
- Motto: "Ploughing minds for service"
- Type: Public
- Academic affiliations: KNUST, Northampton University
- President: Professor Jacob J. Nortey
- Vice-president: Ingrid Ansah
- Administrative staff: 200+
- Students: 5,000+
- Undergraduates: 4,000+
- Postgraduates: 1,000+
- Location: Tema, Ghana
- Campus: Tema, Ho
- Colors: Blue+...
- Website: www.datalink.edu.gh

DataLink University College also known as DataLink Institute is a non-profit tertiary institution founded in 1993 by Ernest Ansah as a charitable education institute. It was fully transformed into a leading university college that offers programs leading to degrees, university access programs and certificates in other disciplines.

The institute has five campuses: Main Campus, Tema, at 5th Avenue, community Ten, Accra, Ho, Pre-university College. Takoradi, Kpando.

Datalink Institute is affiliated with the Kwame Nkrumah University of Science and Technology in Ghana, the University of Northampton (United Kingdom).

It currently has schools of Computer Science, Business Administration and Graduate Studies.
