= Paul Tawiah Quaye =

Ghanaian police officer (1952/1953–2026)

Paul Tawiah Quaye (1952 or 1953 – 22 April 2026) was a Ghanaian police officer who was the Inspector General of Police of the Ghana Police Service from 16 May 2009 to 5 February 2013. The late President, John Evans Atta Mills appointed him as IGP in 2009. He died on 22 April 2026, at the age of 73.

== Career ==
Paul Tawiah Quaye climbed up through the ranks of the Ghana Police Service over several years. In 2009, he was appointed Inspector-General of Police (IGP) by Evans Atta MIlls.

In February 2013, under the administration of John Dramani Mahama, Quaye began a terminal leave ahead of his retirement. He was succeeded in an acting capacity by Mohammed Ahmed Alhassan, who served as Deputy Inspector-General of Police at the time.

== Death ==
Tawiah Quaye died on 22 April 2026.

Police appointments
Preceded by Elizabeth Mills-Robertson	Inspector General of Police; 2009–2013	Succeeded by Mohammed Ahmed Alhassan
