= William Brandford Griffith (judge) =

British legal writer and colonial judge (1858-1939)

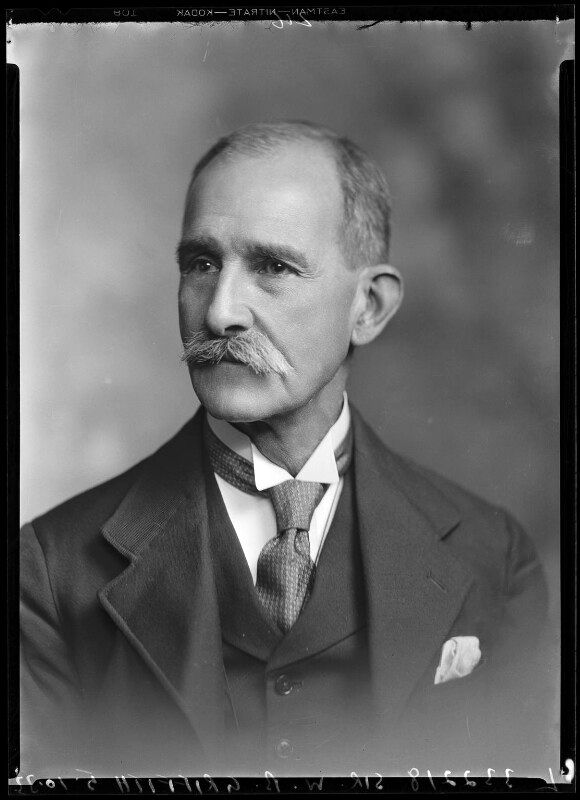
Sir William Brandford Griffith, by Lafayette, 1933

Sir William Brandford Griffith, CBE (9 February 1858 – 8 January 1939) was a British legal writer and colonial judge who was the Chief Justice of the Gold Coast from 1895 to 1911.

The eldest son of William Brandford Griffith, Governor of the Gold Coast from 1885 to 1895, he was educated at University College London, graduating B.A. in 1880, and was called to the bar by the Middle Temple in 1881. In 1884 he married Eveline Florence Elizabeth Nevins, daughter of Penrose Nevins. He was a magistrate in Jamaica before his appointment as Chief Justice of the Gold Coast.

He was knighted in 1898.

== Publication ==
- Kenneth James Beatty: Human leopards. An account of the trials of human leopards before the Special Commission Court. With a note on Sierra Leone, past and present. With a preface by Sir William Brandford Griffith. London, H. Rees, 1915. [Repr. 1978 New York, AMS Press: ISBN 0-404-12006-7]
