= William Douglas Young =

Governor of the Falkland Islands

Sir William Douglas Young KBE CMG (27 January 1859 – 7 March 1943) was a colonial administrator from British Columbia who was Governor of the Falkland Islands from 1915 to 1920.

== Early life ==
William Young was born in the newly created Colony of British Columbia, where his father, William Alexander George Young (a paymaster and captain's secretary in the Royal Navy, attached to the British Northwest Boundary Commission) was the first Colonial Secretary. His mother was Cecilia Eliza Cowan Cameron, born in British Guiana; her stepfather, David Cameron was Chief Justice of the neighbouring Crown Colony of Vancouver Island, and her uncle James Douglas was the first Governor of British Columbia. (Note: For further information on his mother Cecilia and his great-uncle James Douglas, see Girard 1977, Girard 1979 and Girard 1986) William Young was educated at Charterhouse School, and entered the British Colonial civil service in 1877, aged 18.

== Career ==
In 1889, Young was appointed chief Clerk in the Government Secretary's Office, British Guiana, where his mother was born and grew up with his grandmother. In 1895 he became Assistant Colonial Secretary of Mauritius, where he was acting Colonial Secretary in 1896, 1897 and 1898. In 1901, he was appointed Commissioner of the Turks and Caicos Islands where he worked until 1905. He was Administrator of Dominica (part of the British Leeward Islands) in 1906 and was made CMG in the birthday honours list of November 1907.

He was appointed acting Governor and Commissioner-in-Chief in the British Leeward Islands in 1909, and Administrator and Colonial Secretary of St. Lucia in 1913. He moved to the Windward Islands where he was acting Governor and Commissioner-in-Chief in 1914, before his last posting as Governor of the Falkland Islands from 1915 to 1920. During his time as governor he banned humpback whaling for the 1918–1919 season in the Falkland Islands Dependencies, based on a reduction in numbers in the previous year.

Young was made a Knight Commander of the Order of the British Empire in the 1919 Birthday Honours.

He was a member of the Isthmian Club.

== Family ==
William Young was the oldest of three children born to William A. G. Young, R.N., and Cecilia Eliza Cowan Cameron. His siblings were:

- Mary Alice Young (b. 1862). She married Frederick Mitchell Hodgson, later Governor of Gold Coast and Governor of British Guiana. In 1901 she published a volume entitled The Siege of Kumassi, which described her experiences in Kumasi with Hodgson in that critical episode in the Ashanti War of 1900. She was a Lady of Grace of the Order of Saint John of Jerusalem.
- Sir Alfred Joseph Karney Young (1 August 1864 – 5 January 1942). He was a judge in the British colonies; he briefly played cricket for Kent C.C., and was later Chief Justice of Fiji and Chief Judicial Commissioner for the Western Pacific.

== Sources ==
- Debrett's House of Commons and the judicial bench. London: Dean & Son. 1918.
- Girard, Charlotte S.M. (1977). "Sir James Douglas' School Days". BC Studies. 35. University of British Columbia. ISSN 0005-2949.
- Girard, Charlotte S.M. (1979). "Sir James Douglas' Mother and Grandmother". BC Studies. 44. University of British Columbia. ISSN 0005-2949.
- Girard, Charlotte S.M. (1986). "Some Further Notes on the Douglas Family". BC Studies. 72. University of British Columbia. ISSN 0005-2949. [This work continues the work of Lamb 1953.]
- Hodgson, (Mary Alice Young), Lady (1901). The Siege of Kumassi. London: C. Arthur Pearson.
- Lamb, W. Kaye (January–April 1953). "Some notes on the Douglas family" (PDF). British Columbia Historical Quarterly. XVII (1 & 2). Victoria, B.C.: Archives of British Columbia: 41–53.
- Roberts, Peder (2011). The European Antarctic: Science and Strategy in Scandinavia and the British Empire. Palgrave Studies in Cultural and Intellectual History. Palgrave Macmillan. ISBN 9780230337909.
