= Jonas Tawiah-Dodoo =

British sports coach

Jonas Tawiah-Dodoo is a British high performance coach based in Loughborough, Leicestershire. Dodoo is internationally known as the coach of the aspiring runner, Reece Prescod, and several other Olympic and Paralympic medalists such as Greg Rutherford, and Olivia Breen. He was one of the eight coaches who underwent UK Athletics’ Elite Coaching Apprenticeship Programme (ECAP) in the lead-up to the London 2012 Olympics. His wife, Julie Hollman Dodoo, was an Olympic heptathlete, and is a Level 3 Performance Coach and works with England Athletics.

Dodoo played many kinds of sports in the school including rugby. He also played rugby in Hartpury College, where he earned his degree and master’s in Coaching Science. For four years, he was under the tutelage of world-renowned master coach, Dan Pfaff, under the UK Athletics’ Elite Coaching Apprenticeship Programme, and did his master’s thesis about him. Dodoo’s wife, Julie Hollman, also went under Pfaff’s mentorship. Because of this, Dodoo founded Speedworks Charity for aspiring athletes, where he has managed to develop several world-class athletes and coaches. One of the Charity’s athletes was Reece Prescod, who won a silver medal for 100m (9.96) at the 2018 European Athletics Championship. But besides being known for coaching elite athletes, he also has a large involvement in team sports in the UK. In an interview with Athletics Weekly, he said that his company, Speedworks, is “a business in team sports and as a charity in athletics.” He is the speed consultant to Eddie Jones in England Rugby and works as a personal speed coach with England's Anthony Watson and Jonathan Joseph.

== Involvement with Olympians ==
Greg Rutherford is a retired British long jump champion. After his then coach Dan Pfaff went back to the United States in 2013, he appointed Dodoo as his coach up to 2015. CJ Ujah (best: 9.96) is a British Olympian who’s won several medals in various major events was also developed by Dodoo. Another promising British athlete is Daryll Neita, a 4x100m relay sprinter who won a bronze medal in the 2016 Rio Olympics. Other elite athletes include Sean Safo-Antwi, David Bolarinwa, Ojie Edoburun, and recently, Reece Prescod, whose best is 9.93 seconds in 100m.

== Involvement with Paralympians ==
Sophia Warner was a T35 Paralympian sprinter who competed and won a bronze medal in the 2011 IPC Athletics World Championship under Dodoo’s coaching. Like Warner, Olivia Breen is a Paralympian with cerebral palsy (T38) who was coached by Dodoo with his wife, Julie. Furthermore, Bethy Woodward, a T37 sprinter, was once coached by Dodoo as well. Jonnie Peacock, who won a gold medal for 100m T44 in the London 2012 Paralympics Games, was also supported by Dodoo during the time he was being mentored by Dan Pfaff, who was Peacock’s coach at that time.

== Team Sports involvement ==
Rugby Sevens’ highest try-scorer of all time, Dan Norton, was also coached by Dodoo in his early years. Now, Norton is one of the coaches in Dodoo’s company, Speedworks Training. Besides working with Rugby Sevens and Bath Rugby for five years, Dodoo is also involved with England Rugby as a whole, as a consultant to Eddie Jones, and with individuals, working with Marland Yarde, Anthony Watson, and Jonathan Joseph for speed development. Anthony Watson was once fascinated by his speed coach as he undergo recovery and therapy from an injury, saying that Dodoo was "second to none" in terms of his therapy. Wasps Academy once partnered with Dodoo in 2016 to provide speed coaching and education.

== Education ==
Emanuel School and Hartpury College (BSc and Master’s).
