= John Kudalor =

Ghanaian police

John Kudalor IGP
- Occupations: Police Officer; Inspector General of Police; (2016 - 2017)

John Kudalor is a Ghanaian police officer who was the Inspector General of Police under the John Dramani Mahama administration. He served as acting IGP from November 2015 until 19 February 2016 when he was sworn in by President Mahama.

Police appointments
Preceded by Mohammed Ahmed Alhassan	Inspector General of Police; 2016–2017	Succeeded by David Asante-Apeatu
