= Inspector General of Police of the Ghana Police Service =

Most senior police officer in Ghana

The Inspector General of Police (IGP) is the most senior Police Officer in Ghana. The IGP is appointed by the president of Ghana acting in consultation with the Council of State. The IGP is the head of the Police service and is responsible for the operational control and the administration of the Police Service.

The IGP is a member of the Police Council. The first Ghanaian Police Commissioner, E. R. T. Madjitey was appointed to head the service on October 9, 1958. The IGP is aided by two deputies as well as nine directors and a Chief Staff Officer.

Following the retirement of B. A. Yakubu as the head of the Police service, the Progress Party government of Kofi Abrefa Busia appointed R. D. Ampaw, a lawyer civil servant as his successor.

On 22 July 2019, Nana Akufo-Addo, President of Ghana asked David Asante-Apeatu to proceed on leave as the IGP. His deputy, James Oppong-Boanuh was asked to act as IGP until a substantive appointment was made. Asante-Apeatu was due to retire within a month. In August 2021 COP James Oppong-Boanuh was asked to also proceed on leave to make way for the new acting IGP who was later confirmed as the current IGP George Akuffo Dampare.

== Inspectors General of Police of the Ghana Police Service ==
=== Heads of policing in the Gold Coast (1831–1893) ===
The following are the officials in charge of the organisation which eventually became the Ghana Police Service.

No.	Portrait	Inspector General of Police	Took office	Left office	Time in office	Ref.
1	Captain George Maclean	Captain George Maclean (1801–1847); Administrator	1831	1844	12–13 years	
2	Commander Hill	Commander Hill; Governor	1844	1859	14–15 years	
3	Captain John Hawley Glover	Captain John Hawley Glover (1829–1885); Commander	1859	1873	13–14 years	
4	Captain A. W. Baker	Captain A. W. Baker; Inspector-General	1873	1876	2–3 years	
5	Sir Captain James Shaw Hay	Sir Captain James Shaw Hay (1839–1924); Inspector-General	?	?	—	
6	Alexander Grant	Alexander Grant	?	?	—	
7	Captain Bryden	Captain Bryden	?	?	—	
8	Lt. Colonel Edward Bowater McInnis	Lt. Colonel Edward Bowater McInnis (1847–1927); Inspector General of Constabulary	1886	1890	3–4 years	
9	William Brandford Griffith	William Brandford Griffith (1824–1897); Governor of the Gold Coast	1891	1893	1–2 years	

=== Commissioner of Police (1893 - 1966) ===
The head of the Gold Coast Constabulary was designated as the Commissioner of Police. This continued until the coup d'état on 24 February 1966 led to the overthrow of the Nkrumah government and the start of military rule under the National Liberation Council.

No.	Portrait	Inspector General of Police	Took office	Left office	Time in office	Ref.
1	Major A. W. Kitson	Major A. W. Kitson (1862–1938)	1893	1910	16–17 years	
2	E. V. Collins	E. V. Collins (?–1917); Inspector General of Police and Prisons	1910	1917 †	6–7 years	
3	D. R. A. Bettington	D. R. A. Bettington; Inspector General of Police and Prisons	1917	1924	6–7 years	
4	Lt. Colonel H. W. M. Bamford	Lt. Colonel H. W. M. Bamford	27 August 1924	3 January 1938	13 years, 4 months	
5	Captain Eric C. Nottingham	Captain Eric C. Nottingham (1891–1972)	8 October 1938	21 May 1944	5 years, 7 months	
6	Captain R. W. H. Ballantyne	Captain R. W. H. Ballantyne (1896–1965)	21 May 1944	18 August 1948	4 years, 2 months	
7	Captain Percy Eckel	Captain Percy Eckel (1892–?)	18 August 1948	25 May 1949	9 months	
8	Major M. K. N. Collens	Major M. K. N. Collens (?–1957)	26 May 1949	31 December 1957 †	8 years, 7 months	
9	Arthur Lewin Alexander	Arthur Lewin Alexander (1907–1971)	1 May 1958	8 October 1959	1 year, 5 months	
10	E. R. T. Madjitey	E. R. T. Madjitey (1920–1996); First native Ghanaian Commissioner of Police	9 October 1959	8 January 1964	4 years, 2 months	
11	J. W. K. Harlley	J. W. K. Harlley (1919–1982)	1 January 1965	24 February 1966	1 year, 1 month	

=== Inspector General of Police (1966 onwards) ===
Since 1966, the designation of the most senior police officer has been changed from Commissioner of Police to Inspector General of Police.

No.	Portrait	Inspector General of Police	Took office	Left office	Time in office	Ref.
1	J. W. K. Harlley	J. W. K. Harlley (1919–1982)	25 February 1966	3 September 1969	3 years, 6 months	
2	Bawa Andani Yakubu	Bawa Andani Yakubu (1926–2002)	23 September 1969	12 June 1971	1 year, 8 months	
3	R. D. Ampaw	R. D. Ampaw	14 June 1971	13 January 1972	6 months	
4	J. H. Cobbina	J. H. Cobbina	13 January 1972	29 September 1974	2 years, 8 months	
5	Ernest Ako	Ernest Ako (1923–2021)	30 September 1974	7 July 1978	3 years, 9 months	
6	B. S. K. Kwakye	B. S. K. Kwakye	17 July 1978	4 June 1979	10 months	
7	C. O. Lamptey	C. O. Lamptey (1930–2022)	5 June 1979	27 November 1979	5 months	
8	F. P. Kyei	F. P. Kyei	27 November 1979	6 October 1981	1 year, 10 months	
9	R. K. Kugblenu	R. K. Kugblenu (?–2015)	6 October 1981	9 March 1984	2 years, 5 months	
10	S. S. Omane	S. S. Omane (?–2014)	9 March 1984	12 June 1986	2 years, 3 months	
11	C. K. Dewornu	C. K. Dewornu; Acting IGP 12 Jun 86 - 31 Oct 86	1 November 1986	31 December 1989	3 years, 1 month	
12	J. Y. A Kwofie	J. Y. A Kwofie	1 January 1990	30 September 1996	6 years, 8 months	
13	Peter Nanfuri	Peter Nanfuri (1942–2023)	1 October 1996	21 January 2001	4 years, 3 months	
14	Ernest Owusu-Poku	Ernest Owusu-Poku	22 January 2001	21 July 2001	5 months	
15	Nana Owusu-Nsiah	Nana Owusu-Nsiah	22 July 2001	23 March 2005	3 years, 8 months	
16	Patrick Kwateng Acheampong	Patrick Kwateng Acheampong	25 March 2005	28 January 2009	3 years, 10 months	
17	Elizabeth Mills-Robertson	Elizabeth Mills-Robertson; Acting IGP	28 January 2009	15 May 2009	3 months	
18	Paul Tawiah Quaye	Paul Tawiah Quaye (?–2026)	16 May 2009	1 February 2013	3 years, 8 months	
19	Mohammed Ahmed Alhassan	Mohammed Ahmed Alhassan; Acting IGP 5 Feb 2013 to 6 May 2013	7 May 2013	9 November 2015	2 years, 9 months	
20	John Kudalor	John Kudalor; Acting IGP 9 Nov 2015 to 18 Feb 2016	19 February 2016	25 January 2017	1 year, 1 month	
21	David Asante-Apeatu	David Asante-Apeatu	25 January 2017	14 August 2019	2 years, 5 months	
22	James Oppong-Boanuh	James Oppong-Boanuh	9 October 2019	1 August 2021	1 year, 9 months	
23	George Akuffo Dampare	George Akuffo Dampare	8 October 2021	13 March 2025	3 years, 5 months	
24	Christian Tetteh Yohunu	Christian Tetteh Yohunu	13 March 2025		1 year, 98 days	

== External links and sources ==
- Ghana Police Service website
- April 2006 - Journal of Security Sector Management
- Photo Gallery of former IGPs
