= Nana Owusu-Nsiah =

Ghanaian diplomat

Ghanaian Ambassador to Israel
- Incumbent
- Assumed office 2006
- President: John Kufuor

Inspector General of Police
- In office July 22, 2001 – March 23, 2005
- President: John Kufuor
- Preceded by: Ernest Owusu-Poku
- Succeeded by: Patrick Kwateng Acheampong

Personal details
- Profession: Police officer

Nana Stephen Owusu-Nsiah is a police officer and diplomat. He was the Ghanaian ambassador to Israel and a former Inspector General of Police of the Ghana Police Service (IGP).

== Career ==
Owusu-Nsiah was appointed by President Kufuor as the IGP in 2001. He held this position for 4 years until his retirement in 2005.

=== Ambassador to Israel ===
Owusu-Nsiah was appointed the Ghanaian ambassador to Israel in May 2006 by President John Kufuor.

== See also ==
- Inspector General of Police of the Ghana Police Service

Police appointments
Preceded by Ernest Owusu-Poku	Inspector General of Police; 2001 – 2005	Succeeded by Patrick Kwateng Acheampong
Diplomatic posts
Preceded by ?	Ghanaian Ambassador to Israel; 2006 – present	Incumbent
