= Edward Bowater McInnis =

Lieutenant-Colonel Edward Bowater McInnis CMG (15 March 1847 - 4 April 1927) was the Inspector General of Constabulary in the Gold Coast between 1886 and 1890. He was an officer in the British Army.

McInnis was first commissioned into the British army on 29 April 1874. He became a Major in the army on 30 March 1887. He was appointed honorary lieutenant-colonel on 23 April 1887. He was appointed to the 9th Lancers in India in 1875.

Lt. Colonel McInnis succeeded Captain Bryden as the head of policing in the Gold Coast. He served in this capacity for four years. He was the last British officer to serve in this capacity. Following his appointment, the police force was placed directly under the control of the Governor Sir William Brandford Griffith until the Colonial government started appointing Commissioners of Police in 1893.

He was awarded the Companion of the Order of St Michael and St George (CMG) in the 1890 New Year Honours list by Queen Victoria while he was the Inspector General of Constabulary in the then Gold Coast colony.

Edward McInnis married Maud Susanna in October 1889.

McInnis also served in Malta after leaving the Gold Coast, where he was involved in the setting up of a Detective and Alien Office which later developed into the Criminal Investigation Department of the Malta Police Force.

He died in Kent, England in 1927.

== See also ==
- Inspector General of Police of the Ghana Police Service

Police appointments
Preceded by Captain Bryden	Inspector General of Police; 1893 - 1910	Succeeded by William Brandford Griffith
