= Cornelius Kortright =

British colonial administrator (1817-1897)

Sir Cornelius Hendricksen Kortright KCMG
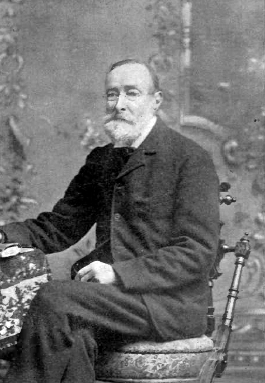

Personal details
- Born: 26 December 1817 London, England, United Kingdom
- Died: 23 December 1897 (aged 79) Ontario, Canada
- Profession: Diplomat, civil servant

Sir Cornelius Hendricksen Kortright, KCMG (26 December 1817 – 23 December 1897) was a British colonial administrator who held positions including Governor of British Guiana.

Kortright was baptised on 8 January 1818 at Saint Mary church in London. He was the son of Lawrence and Jane Maria Kortright. He died on 23 December 1897 in Ontario, Canada.

Kortright was knighted in 1882. While in Australia, Cornelius Kortright worked for Edmond Morey, and is mentioned in chapters four and five of 'Reminiscences of a pioneer in New South Wales. By Edmond Morey, of Maryborough, Queensland, published in 1907.

- From 1854 until 1857, he was the President of the British Virgin Islands.
- From 1857 until 1864, he was Lieutenant Governor of Grenada.
- From 1864 until 1872, he was Lieutenant Governor of Tobago.
- In 1875 and again from 1876 until 1877, he was the Governor of Sierra Leone.
- From 3 April 1877 until 13 December 1881, he was Governor of British Guiana

In 1886, Kortright settled in Canada, in the town of Barrie, Ontario.

Government offices
Preceded by John Cornell Chads	President of the British Virgin Islands; 1854–1857	Succeeded by Thomas Price
Preceded by Robert William Keate	Lieutenant Governor of Grenada; 1857–1864	Succeeded by Robert Miller Mundy
Preceded by James Vickery Drysdale	Lieutenant Governor of Tobago; 1864–1872	Succeeded by Herbert Taylor Ussher
Preceded by Jeremiah Thomas Fitzgerald Callaghan	Administrator of The Gambia; 1873–1875	Succeeded by Sir Samuel Rowe
Preceded by Samuel Rowe	Governor of Sierra Leone; 1876–1877	Succeeded by Horatio James Huggins
Preceded by William A. G. Young	Governor of British Guiana; 1877–1881	Succeeded by William A. G. Young
