= Ghana Police Academy =

Police academy in Tesano, Ghana

The Ghana Police College was established in 1959 in Tesano, Accra to policemen and women in Ghana. Before its establishment all Senior Police Officers were trained in the United Kingdom.

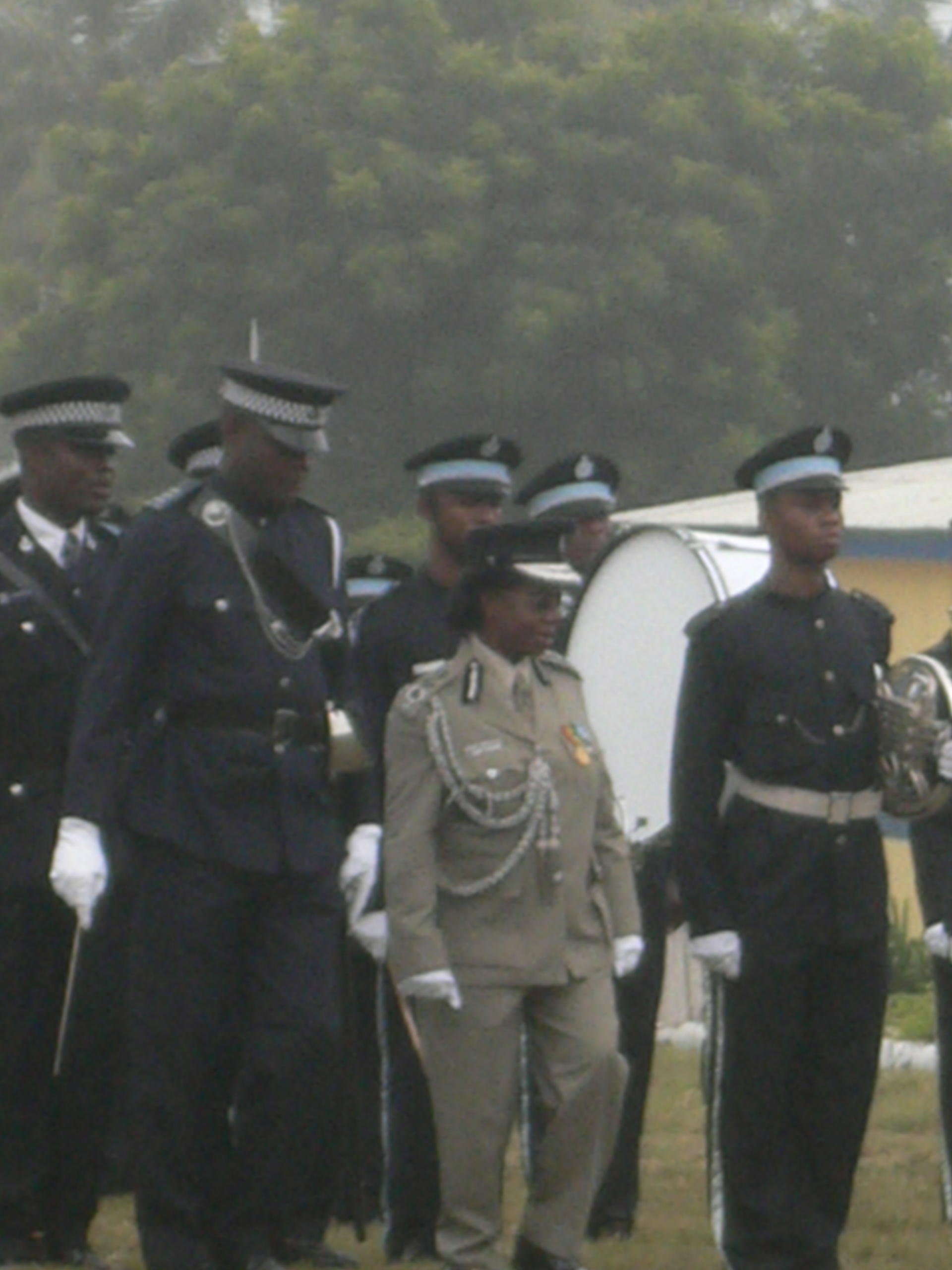
Police Officers at the Police Academy
