= Ghana Police Service =

Main law enforcement agency of Ghana

- Ghana Police Service patch depicting the service logo

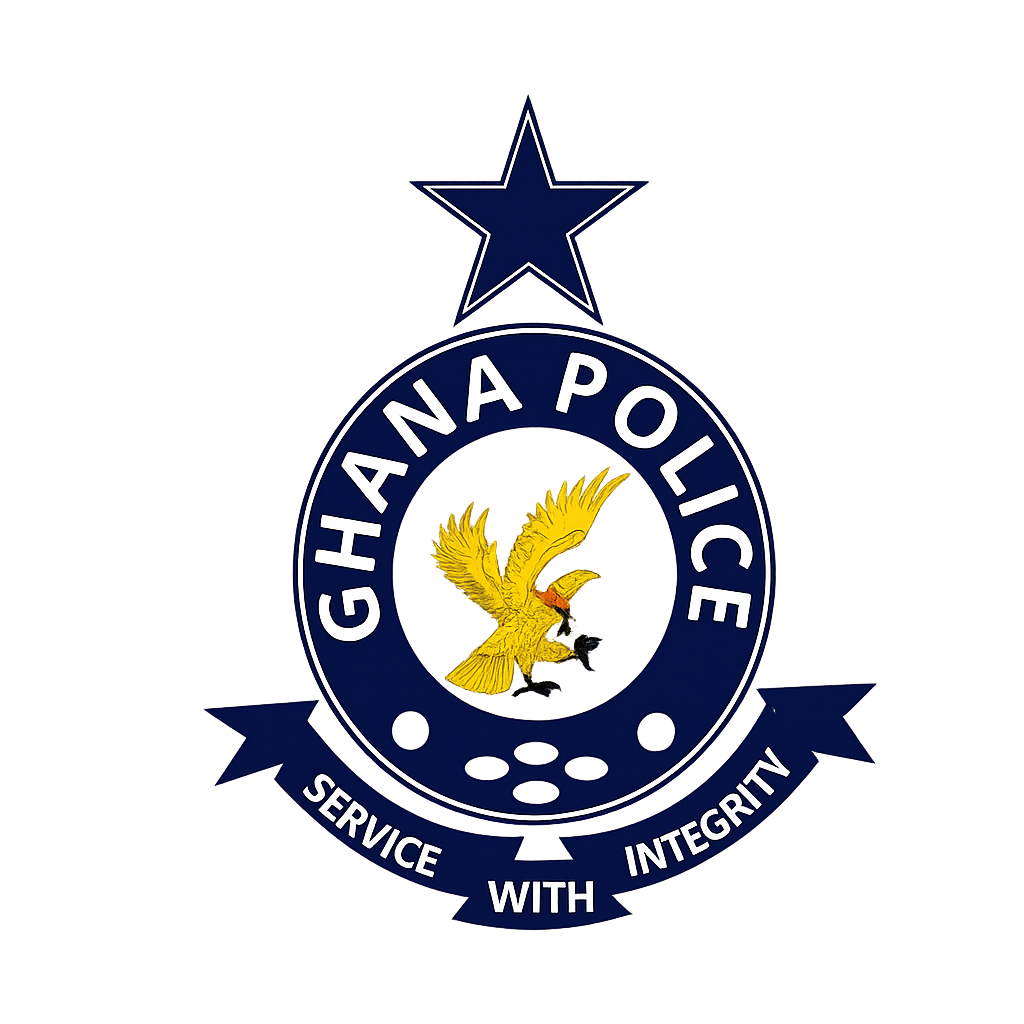
- Logo of the Ghana Police Service

- Shield of the Ghana Police Service
- Common name: Ghana Police Service
- Abbreviation: GPS
- Motto: Service With Integrity

Agency overview
- Formed: 1894
- Preceding agencies: 1894 – 1957: known as the Gold Coast Police Force; 1957 – known as the Ghana Police Service
- Employees: 32,684 (30 June 2011)

Jurisdictional structure
- National agency: Republic of Ghana
- Operations jurisdiction: Republic of Ghana
- Map of Ghana Police Service's jurisdiction
- Area: 238,530 square kilometres (92,098 sq mi)
- Population: 24,233,431
- Governing body: Government of Ghana
- Constituting instruments: Police Act 1904; Police Act 1960; Police Act 1970; Policing Act 1992
- General nature: Local civilian police

Operational structure
- Headquarters: Accra, Greater Accra, Ghana
- Sworn members: 23,684 (30 June 2011)
- Unsworn members: 9,000 (30 June 2011)
- Minister responsible: Mubarak Mohammed Muntaka, Minister for Interior
- Agency executive: COP Christian Tetteh Yohunu, Inspector General of Police
- Departments: 18: • Administration; • Criminal Investigation; • Finance; • Human Resource; • ICT; • Legal & Prosecution; • Motor Traffic & Transport Unit; • National Operations; • National Patrol Department; • National Protection Directorate; • Police Intelligence Directorate; • Police Professional Standard Bureau; • Public Affairs; • Research, Planning & Transformation; • Services; • Special Duties; • Technical; • Welfare
- Regions: 10: Ashanti; Brong-Ahafo; Central; Eastern; Greater Accra; Northern; Upper East; Upper West; Volta; Western

Facilities
- Stations: 651+

Website
- www.police.gov.gh

The Ghana Police Service (GPS) is the main law enforcement agency of Ghana. The service is under the control of the Ghanaian Ministry of the Interior, and employs over 30,000 officers across its 651 stations. The key functions of the Service are:

- Prevention and detection of crime.
- Apprehension and prosecution of offenders.
- Maintenance of law and order.
- Protection of life and property.

== Organisational structure ==
The Ghana Police Service operates in twelve divisions: ten covering the ten regions of Ghana, one assigned specifically to the seaport and industrial hub of Tema, and the twelfth being the Railways, Ports and Habours Division. An additional division, the Marine Police Unit, exists to handle issues that arise from the country's offshore oil and gas industry.

The current head of the Ghana Police Service is Inspector General of Police (IGP) Christian Tetteh Yohunu. For each of the regional police divisions, there is a Regional Commander who is in charge of all operational and administrative functions under his jurisdiction. In direct operational matters, the Regional Commander furthermore works in tandem with the Regional Operational Commander. For administrative functions, the Regional Commander is assisted by the Deputy Regional Commander and the Regional Crime Officer. The Deputy Inspector-General of Police is assisted by the Director-General of the Police Administration, and supervises the activities of the regional commanders of police.

=== Regional divisions ===
Apart from the National Police Headquarters, all the regional divisions have subdivisions under them. The aim of this is to decentralize the activities of the regional police force for more effective and flexible service.

=== Special units ===
External videos
- Police Drills

There are, furthermore, specialized police units in all the regional divisions. The Regional Commander has oversight over these units. These units include:

- Arms and Ammunition
- Audit Offices
- Courts and Prosecution
- Crime Offices
- Domestic Violence and Victim Support
- Finance Offices
- Highway Patrol Unit
- Mobile Force (in eight regions)
- Motor Traffic and Transport Unit
- Police Training Schools (in five regions).
- Public Affairs Directorate
- Rapid Deployment Force
- Mounted Squadron

=== Marine Police Unit ===
In April 2011, the Ghana Police Service set up a special Marine Police Unit (MPU). The unit has amongst its duties policing operations related to the country's oil and gas industry, and the handling of offenses contained in the Fisheries Act 2002 and Fisheries Regulations 2011.

The Marine Unit was inaugurated in Takoradi on 21 June 2013 by Vice President Kwesi Amissah-Arthur. The unit operates two 9-meter patrol boats (P1 & P2) and four 6.3-meter rigid inflatable boats (P3, P4, P5 & P6).

=== Mounted Squadron ===
On August 12, 2021, the Ghana Police Service launched a horse patrol operations as part of the Mounted Squadron Unit of the Ghana Police Service. This unit would be running patrol services in some selected part of Accra, Ghana.

=== Other ===
The Ghana Police Service has a women's soccer/football club called the Police Ladies Football Club, which was formed in 2007. The club plays in the Ghana Women’s Premier League, the first tier women's football league.

== Inspector General of Police ==
The current head of the Ghana Police Service is Inspector General of Police (IGP) Christian Tetteh Yohunu. He was sworn into office on March 14, 2025 after being appointed by the President John Dramani Mahama. He directly reports to the Minister of the Interior. He is also assisted in the day to day administration of the Service by the Schedule Officers and the Regional Commanders.

== Ghana Police Ranks ==
- Inspector General of Police
- Deputy Inspector General
- Commissioner
- Deputy Commissioner
- Assistant Commissioner
- Chief Superintendent
- Superintendent
- Deputy Superintendent
- Assistant Superintendent
- Chief Inspector
- Inspector
- Sergeant
- Corporal
- Lance Corporal
- Constable

== Gallery ==
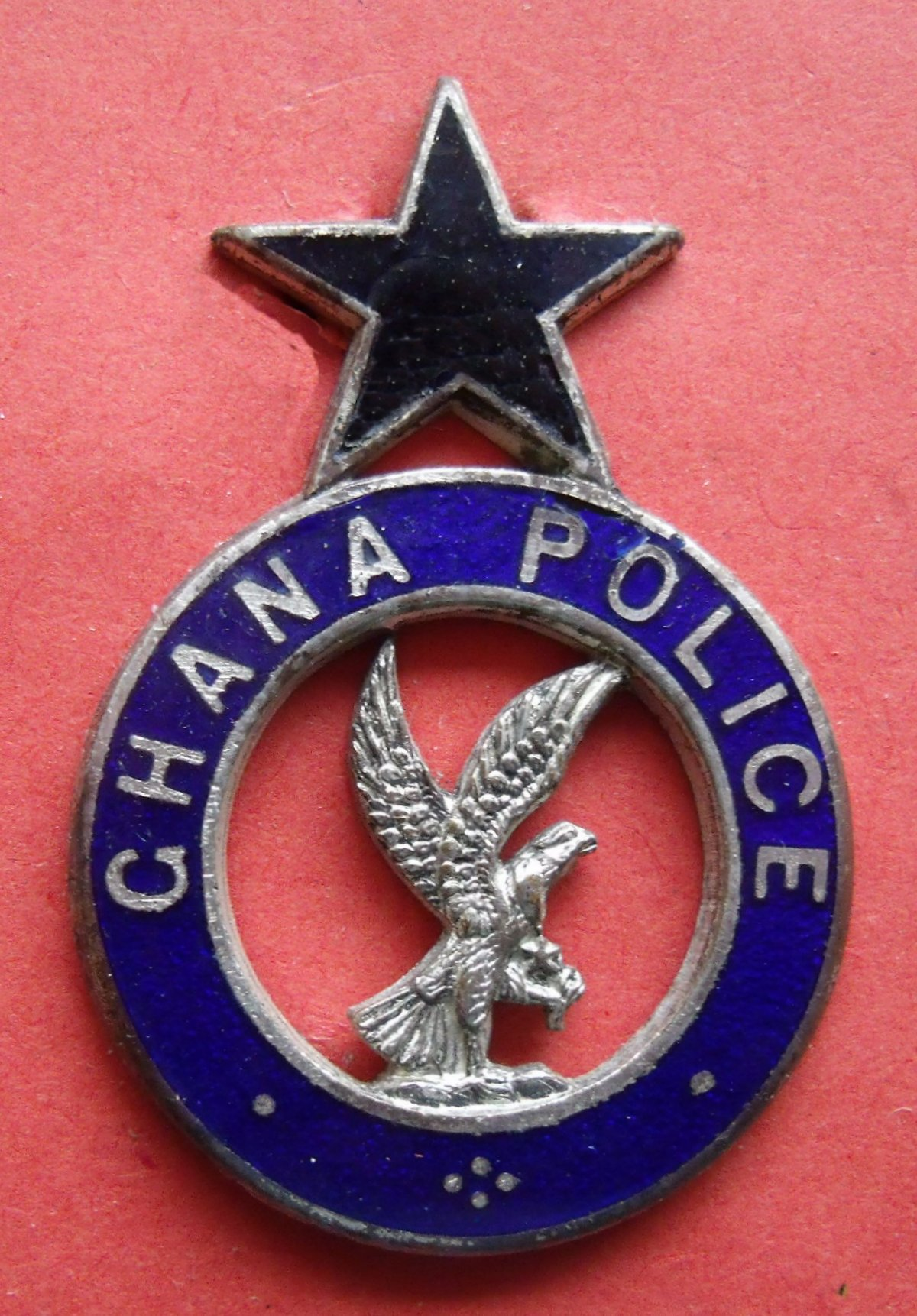
Ghana Police Service badge.

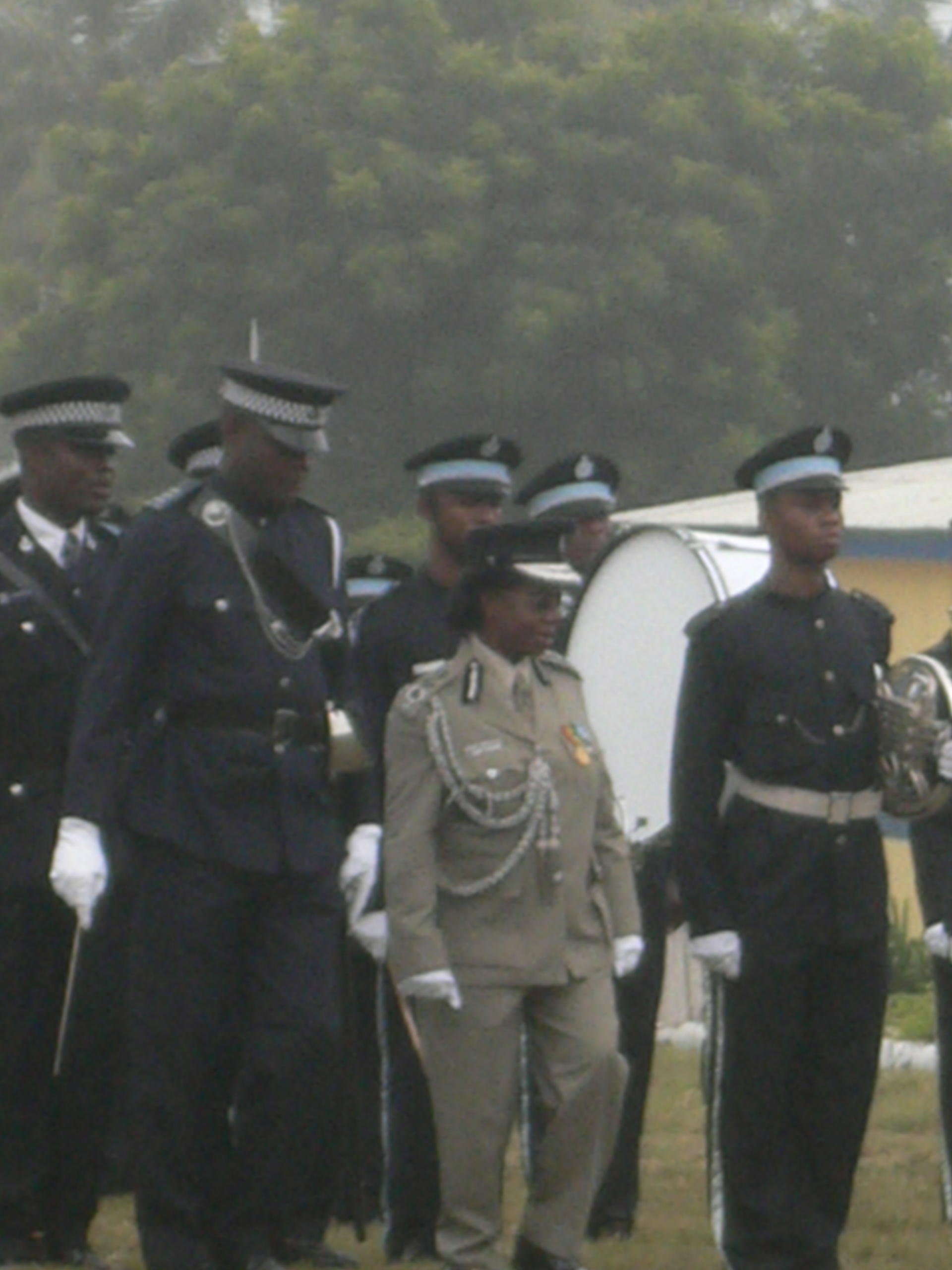
Ghana Police Service officers and academy.

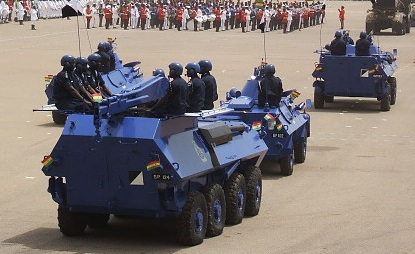
Ghana Police Service Mowag Piranha I 8x8, MOWAG Roland and Mowag Piranha I 4x4.

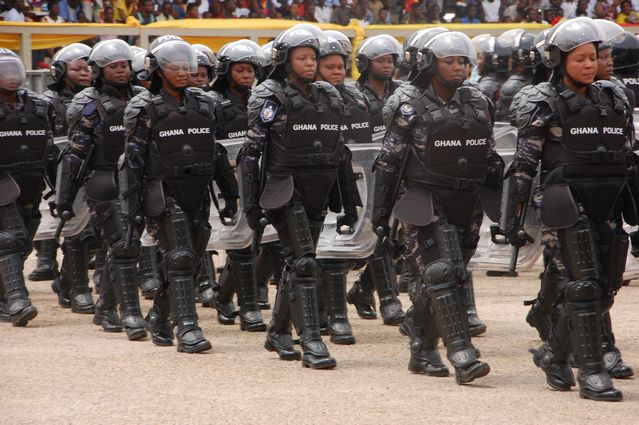
All-women riot police unit at the 59th Independence Day parade.

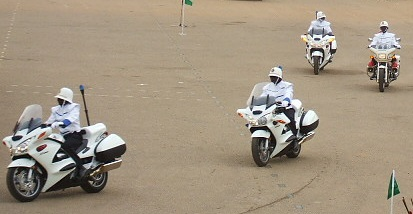
Ghana Police Service motorcycles and despatch riders.

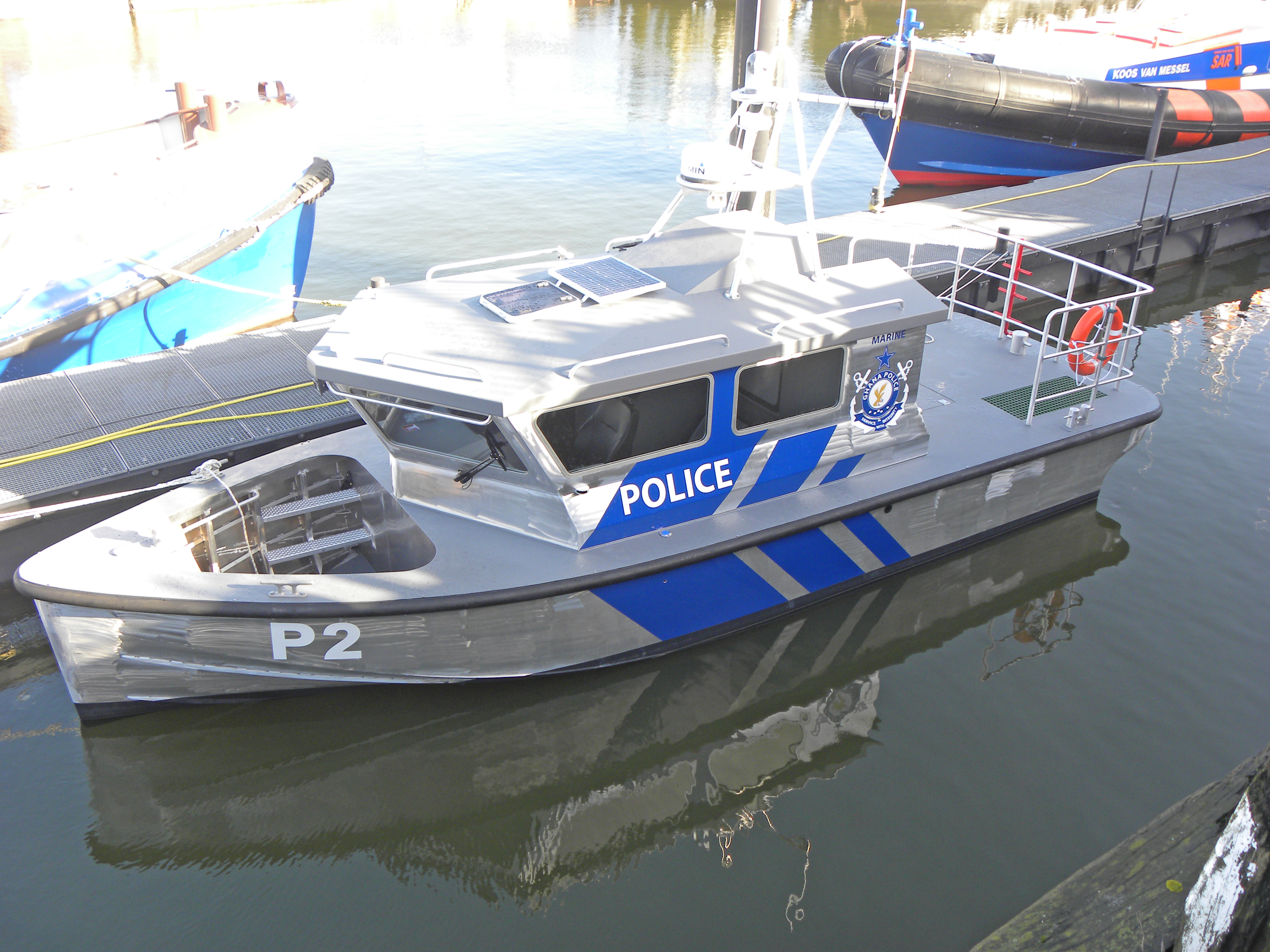
Police Unit (MPU) patrol boat P2.

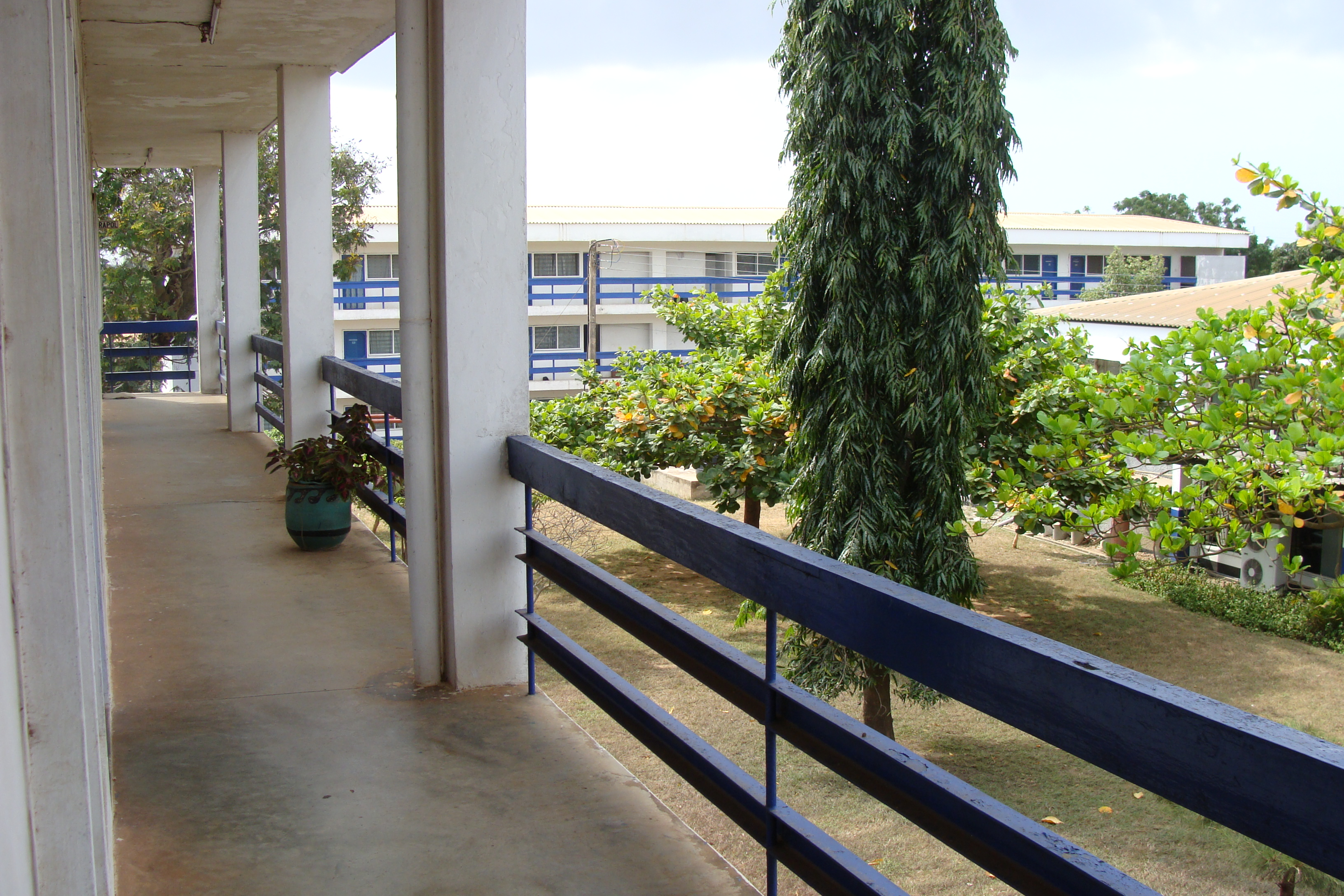
Facilities at the Ghana Police College, in Accra

== See also ==
- Law enforcement in Ghana
- Inspector General of Police of the Ghana Police Service
- Ministry of Interior (Ghana)
- Ghana Police Academy
- Crime in Ghana
- Police Ladies F.C.
