= Council of State (Ghana) =

Government agency

The Council of State in Ghana is a body of prominent citizens, analogous to the Council of Elders in the traditional political system, which advises the president on national issues.

The Council of State was established by Articles 89 to 92 of the 1992 Constitution of Ghana: "There shall be a Council of State to counsel the President in the performance of his functions."

== Membership ==
The Council of State should include a former Chief Justice of Ghana, a former Chief of the Defence Staff and a former Inspector General of Police and the president of the National House of Chiefs. Each region of Ghana also has an elected representative. The President of Ghana also appoints eleven members. Members stay in office until the term of office of the president ends.

Every four years, the Electoral Commission of Ghana organises elections to fill the elected positions. There is an Electoral College formed in every region to elect their representative. The College is made up of two representatives nominated by each District Assembly. Any registered voter who is a citizen of Ghana is qualified to stand for election. Nominations for each person must be proposed and seconded by two registered voters from the region and be supported by a further twenty voters from the region. The voting by the Electoral College is usually held at the Regional Capital.

== Meetings ==
The council is required to meet four times a year. It can also meet if requested by the President of Ghana, the Parliament of Ghana or by at least five sitting members of the council. There should be more than half the members of the Council at a meeting to form a quorum. Decisions of the council are valid if voted for by the majority of members present at the meeting. The Council regulates its own procedures subject to the provisions of the Ghana Constitution.

== Current members ==
Following the change of government in January 2025, the membership of the Council of State will be changing. Elections are being held for the elected regional representatives on 11 February 2025 in all regional capitals. The new President will also be nominating his eleven appointees to the Council. 154 people made up of 144 men and 10 women contested the elected positions in all 16 regions. In 2025, the total membership of the Electoral College in all regions was 522, consisting of 2 voters from each District Assembly. The election in the Ashanti Region did not occur as scheduled as thugs disrupted proceedings and destroyed materials. There was a tie in North Eastern Region so a re-run was scheduled for 13 February 2025. The final list of elected members and those appointed by Mahama were sworn in on 18 February 2025 at Jubilee House.

=== Elected members ===
Name	Term	Comments
Yaw Okyere	11 Feb 2025 - present	Ahafo Region
Yaw Owusu Obimpeh	19 Feb 2025 - present	Ashanti Region
Odeneho Afram Brempong III (aka Kusi Boachie Yiadom)	11 Feb 2025 - present	Bono Region; Paramount Chief of the Suma Traditional Area; Assistant Registrar in charge of the School of Arts and Social Sciences at the University of Energy and Natural Resources
Nana Pimampim Yaw Kabrese V	11 Feb 2025 - present	Bono East region. Paramount Chief of the Yeji Traditional Area; President of the Bono East Regional House of Chiefs
Habib Hakeem	11 Feb 2025 - present	Central Region; A miner
Evelyn Korang	11 Feb 2025 - present	Eastern Region
Nene Drolor Bosso Adamtey I (aka Kingsley A. Fletcher)	11 Feb 2025 - present	Greater Accra Region; International Consultant, Author and Public Speaker
Saaka Abuba	19 Feb 2025 - present	North East Region.
Muhammad Mumuni	11 Feb 2025 - present	Northern Region; Foreign Minister under President Mills
Richard Kings Atikpo	Feb 2021 – present	Oti Region. First person to represent the Region. Only member re-elected in 2025.
Tingawura Samson Seidu Abudu	11 Feb 2025 – present	Savannah Region; Chief of Tinga
Thomas More Pe Adiale Ditundini Adiali Ayagitam III, Chiana Pio	11 Feb 2025 - present	Upper East Region; Paramount Chief of the Chiana Traditional Area; President of the Upper East Regional House of Chiefs
Michael Kwame Mumuni	11 Feb 2025 – present	Upper West Region
Gabriel Tanko Kwamigah-Atokple		Volta Region. Businessman
Maxwell Boakye	11 Feb 2025 – present	Western Region.
Michael Aidoo	11 Feb 2025 - present	Western North Region
=== Appointed members ===
Edward Adjaho	19 Feb 2025 - present	Former Speaker of the Parliament of Ghana (Volta Region)
Cletus Avoka	19 Feb 2025 - present	Former MP for Zebilla (Upper East Region)
Betty Mould-Iddrisu	19 Feb 2025 - present	Former Attorney General (Ashanti Region)
Vida Akoto-Bamfo	19 Feb 2025 - present	Former Supreme Court judge (Greater Accra Region)
Eunice Brookman-Amissah	19 Feb 2025 - present	Former Minister for Health (Central Region)
Molly Anim Addo	19 Feb 2025 - present	Former Ambassador (Greater Accra Region)
Daasebre Boamah Darko	19 Feb 2025 - present	Chief of Akyem Kukuratumi (Eastern Region)
Osabarima Kwesi Attah II	19 Feb 2025 - present	Paramount Chief of the Oguaa Traditional Area (Central Region)
Mankpanwura Jakpa Achor-Ade Borenyi I	19 Feb 2025 - present	Paramount Chief of the Mankpan Traditional Area (Savannah Region)
Cynthia Komley Adjetey	19 Feb 2025 - present	(Greater Accra Region)
Nana Saa Gyamfuaa II	19 Feb 2025 - present	Queen Mother of Ayima Traditional Area (Bono Region)
=== Ex-Officio Members ===
Ogyeahohoo Yaw Gyebi II	12 Nov 2020 - present	President of the National House of Chiefs; Paramount Chief of Sefwi Anhwiaso Traditional Area
Air Marshall Michael Samson-Oje	19 Feb 2025 - present	former Chief of the Defence Staff
Mohammed Ahmed Alhassan	19 Feb 2025 - present	former Inspector General of Police
Sophia Akuffo	19 Feb 2025 - present	former Chief Justice of Ghana

== Past members of the Council of State ==
=== 2021 to 2025 ===
The membership from the past four years was sworn in by President Nana Akufo-Addo on 23 February 2021 at the Jubilee House. The vacant position reserved for former Chief Justice of Ghana was filled following the appointment of Georgina Theodora Wood following her retirement.

=== Elected members ===
Region	Name	Term	Comments
Ahafo Region	Yaw Basoa	Feb 2021 – 6 Jan 2025	First person to represent the Region
Ashanti Region	Nana Owusu Achiaw Brempong	Feb 2017–6 Jan 2025	
Ashanti Region	Nana Asiama Poku Afrifa	March 2009 - Jan 2017	
Ashanti Region	Benjamin Asonaba Dapaah	2001 - Jan 2009	Transport Owner
Bono Region	Kwadwo Agyenim Boateng	Feb 2017–Jan2025	He represented Brong Ahafo Region from 2017 until the region got divided into 3 regions.
Bono East Region	Oseadeeyo Akumfi Ameyaw IV	2021 – 6 Jan 2025	A court injunction delayed this seat being occupied.
Brong Ahafo Region	Kwadwo Agyenim Boateng	Feb 2017 - 6 Jan 2021	Also represented Bono Region from 2021
Brong Ahafo Region	Nana Saa Gyamfuaa II	Feb 2013 - Jan 2017	
Brong Ahafo Region	J. H. Owusu-Acheampong	March 2009 - Jan 2013	former Regional Minister, Provisional National Defence Council
Brong Ahafo Region	Michael Kwadwo Adusah	2001 - Jan 2009	Retired Assistant Commissioner of Police
Central Region	Emmanuel Baidoo (Odeefuo Afankwa III)	Feb 2021 – 6 Jan 2025	
Central Region	Obrempong Appiah Nuamah II	Feb 2017–Feb 2021	
Central Region	Percival Alfred Kuranchie	Feb 2013 - Jan 2017	
Central Region	Ato Essuman	2005 - Jan 2013	Management consultant
Eastern Region	Paa Kofi Ansong	Feb 2021 – 6 Jan 2025	
Eastern Region	Nana Somuah Mireku- Nyampong	Feb 2017 – Jan 2021	
Eastern Region	Nana Kodua Kesse II	Feb 2013 – Jan 2017	
Eastern Region	Osabarima Owusu Gyamadu III	March 2009 – Jan 2013	
Eastern Region	Fredrick Guggisberg Yaw Ofori-Atta	2005 - Jan 2009	Industrial Relations Practitioner
Greater Accra Region	E. T. Mensah	Feb 2021 – 6 Jan 2025	
Greater Accra Region	Nii Kotei Dzani	Feb 2017 – Feb 2021	
Greater Accra Region	Emmanuel Adzei-Anang	2009 - Jan 2017	
Greater Accra Region	John Sackah Addo	2005 - Jan 2009	Former governor of the Bank of Ghana
North East Region	Azumah Namoro Sanda	Feb 2021 – 6 Jan 2025	First person to represent the Region.
Northern Region	Mahamoud Tahiru (Zung Lana)	Feb 2021– 6 Jan 2025	
Northern Region	Bo-Na Professor Yakubu S. Nantogma	Feb 2017 - Feb 2021	
Northern Region	Vo-Naa Bawah Mohammed Baba	March 2009 - Jan 2017	
Northern Region	Naa Sebiyam Nabila	2005 - Jan 2009	
Savannah Region	Adam Zakariah	Feb 2021 – 6 Jan 2025	First person to represent the Region.
Upper East Region	Tong-Raan Kugbilsong Nalebegtang	Feb 2021 – 6 Jan 2025	
Upper East Region	The Rt. Rev. Dr Jacob Kofi Ayeebo	March 2009 - Jan 2017	
Upper East Region	Francis Asianab Afoko	2005 - Jan 2009	Businessman
Upper West Region	Daniel Anlieu-Mwine Bagah	Feb 2021 – 6 Jan 2025	
Upper West Region	Kuoro Richard Babini Kanton IV	Feb 2017–Jan 2021	
Upper West Region	Guli-Naa Seidu Bhat Braimah	Feb 2009 - Jan 2017	Former District Chief Executive for Wa Municipal (Longest Serving DCE). (Chief of Guli Traditional area)
Upper West Region	Naa Seidu Braimah	March 2009 - Jan 2013	
Upper West Region	Kuoro Kuri-Buktie Limann IV	2005 - Jan 2009	Paramount Chief of Gwollu Traditional Area
Volta Region	Francis Albert Seth Nyonyo	Feb 2017 – 6 Jan 2025	
Volta Region	Togbui Binah Lawluvi VI	2013 - Jan 2017	Paramount Chief of Ziope Traditional area Lawyer and lecturer at Ho Polytechnic; President of Volta Regional Chapter of Association of Rural Banks
Volta Region	Bernard Kwasi Glover	March 2009 - Jan 2013	
Volta Region	Togbe Kpangbatriku III	2005 - Jan 2009	Paramount Chief of Dodome Traditional Area
Western Region	Eunice Jacqueline Buah Asomah- Hinneh	Feb 2017 – 6 Jan 2025	There was a tie for this position in the election. Owner of Labianca Company
Western Region	George Kofi Dadzie	March 2009 - Jan 2017	
Western Region	Paul Kwabena Damoah	2005 - Jan 2009	Agriculturist
Western North region	Katakyie Kwasi Bumagama II	Feb 2021 – 6 Jan 2025	First person to represent the Region.
=== Appointed members ===
Appointing President	Name	Term	Comments
Nana Akufo-Addo (2017 — 2025)	Nana Otuo Siriboe II	Feb 2017 – 6 Jan 2025 (also 2001 - 2009)	Paramount Chief of Asante-Juaben Traditional Area; Former Lecturer at the Kwame Nkrumah University of Science and Technology; Elected chairman by the council in 2017 and re-elected in 2021
Nana Akufo-Addo (2017 — 2025)	Sam Okudzeto	Feb 2017 – 6 Jan 2025	former president of the Ghana Bar Association
Nana Akufo-Addo (2017 — 2025)	Stanley Nii Adjiri Blankson	Feb 2017 – 6 Jan 2025	former mayor of Accra
Nana Akufo-Addo (2017 — 2025)	Mrs. Alberta Cudjoe	Feb 2017 – 6 Jan 2025	
Nana Akufo-Addo (2017 — 2025)	Alhaji Aminu Amadu	Feb 2017 – 6 Jan 2025	
Nana Akufo-Addo (2017 — 2025)	Margaret Amoakohene	Feb 2017 – 6 Jan 2025	School of Communication Studies, University of Ghana, Legon;
Nana Akufo-Addo (2017 — 2025)	Mrs. Georgina Kusi	Feb 2017 – 6 Jan 2025	
Nana Akufo-Addo (2017 — 2025)	Alhaji Sule Yiremiah	Feb 2017 – 6 Jan 2025	
Nana Akufo-Addo (2017 — 2025)	Justice Ofei Akrofi	Feb 2021–Jan2025	Anglican Archbishop
Nana Akufo-Addo (2017 — 2025)	Ato Essuman	Feb 2017 – 6 Jan 2025	
Nana Akufo-Addo (2017 — 2025)	Kuoro Richard Babini Kanton VI	Feb 2017 – 6 Jan 2025	Tumu Kuoro and elected member for Upper West Region from 2017 - 2021
Nana Akufo-Addo (2017 — 2025)	Paa Kofi Ansong	Feb 2017 - Feb 2021	
Nana Akufo-Addo (2017 — 2025)	Nana Kofi Obiri Egyir II	Feb 2017 - Feb 2021	Sanaa Lodge
Nana Akufo-Addo (2017 — 2025)	Alhaji Sahanun Moqtar	Feb 2017 – Feb 2021	
John Mahama (2012 — 2017)	John Henry Martey Newman	Feb 2013 - Jan 2017	Former Chairman of the Council former Chief of Staff under the late President John Mills
John Mahama (2012 — 2017)	Nana Osei Asibey	Feb 2013 - Jan 2017	Daabosohene, Ashanti Region
John Mahama (2012 — 2017)	Cecilia Johnson	Feb 2013 - Jan 2017	Chairman of the Council of State (2013 to 2017) former Minister for Local Government and Rural Development, Brong-Ahafo Region
John Mahama (2012 — 2017)	Ama Benyiwa Doe	Feb 2013 - Jan 2017	former Central Regional Minister & former Central Region representative
John Mahama (2012 — 2017)	Abraham Kweku Edusei	Feb 2013 - Jan 2017	Eastern Region
John Mahama (2012 — 2017)	Rabiatu Deinyo Armah	Feb 2013 - Jan 2017	Greater Accra Region
John Mahama (2012 — 2017)	Rasheed Sulemana Mahama	Feb 2013 - Jan 2017	Tuluwewura, Northern Region
John Mahama (2012 — 2017)	David Kanga	2013 - Jan 2017	Upper East Region
John Mahama (2012 — 2017)	Edward Nminyuor Gyader	2013- Jan 2017	Upper West Region
John Mahama (2012 — 2017)	Patrick Enyonam Agboba (Togbe Sri III)	2013 - Jan 2017	Volta Region
John Mahama (2012 — 2017)	Okogyeman Kweku Gyamerah III	February 2013 - Jan 2017	Sefwi Chiranohene, Western Region
John Mahama (2012 — 2017)	Abraham Kwaku Adusei		
John Atta Mills (2009 — 2012)	Mrs Victoria Addy	March 2009 - Jan 2013	
John Atta Mills (2009 — 2012)	Hajara Musah Ali	March 2009 - Jan 2013	
John Atta Mills (2009 — 2012)	Mrs Cecilia Johnson	March 2009 – Jan 2013	former Minister for Local Government and Rural Development
John Atta Mills (2009 — 2012)	George Akilagpa Sawyerr	March 2009 - Jan 2013	Former Vice Chancellor of the University of Ghana
John Atta Mills (2009 — 2012)	Mahama Iddrisu	March 2009 - Jan 2013	former member of PNDC and Defence Minister
John Atta Mills (2009 — 2012)	Nana Akuoko Sarpong	March 2009 - Jan 2013	former Secretary for Chieftaincy Affairs; Omanhene of Agogo Traditional Area
John Atta Mills (2009 — 2012)	Otumfuor Baidoo Bonso XV	March 2009 - Jan 2013	
John Atta Mills (2009 — 2012)	Daasebre Kwebu Ewusi VII	March 2009 - Jan 2013	
John Atta Mills (2009 — 2012)	Nii Amoo Darku	March 2009 - Jan 2013	
John Atta Mills (2009 — 2012)	Asoma Abu Banda	March 2009 - Jan 2013	
John Atta Mills (2009 — 2012)	Kofi Awoonor	March 2009 - Jan 2013	Chairman of Council of State (2009 - 2013) former Permanent Representative to the United Nations and retired University lecturer
John Kufuor (2001 — 2009)	Naa Thomas Tia Sulemana	2005 - Jan 2009	Zosali-Na
John Kufuor (2001 — 2009)	Nana Ogyeabuor Akompi Finam II	2001 - Jan 2005	
John Kufuor (2001 — 2009)	Naa Abayifa Karbo II	2001-2005	
John Kufuor (2001 — 2009)	Kofi Amanor Ansah	2001-2005	
John Kufuor (2001 — 2009)	Nana Prah Agyensaim	2001-2005	
John Kufuor (2001 — 2009)	Nana Otuo Siribour II	2005- Jan 2009 also 2017 - 2025	Paramount Chief of Asante-Juaben Traditional Area and former lecturer at the Kwame Nkrumah University of Science and Technology
John Kufuor (2001 — 2009)	Fred Ofori-Atta Asante	2001-2005	
John Kufuor (2001 — 2009)	Albert Adu Boahen	2001-2004	Retired University of Ghana lecturer
John Kufuor (2001 — 2009)	Emma Mitchell	2001-2005	Former Minister for Trade and Industry
John Kufuor (2001 — 2009)	Alhaji Alhassan Bin-Salih	2001 - Jan 2009	
John Kufuor (2001 — 2009)	Clement Kubindiwor Tedam	2001 - Jan 2009	former Minister of Local Government, (SMC) and Educationist
John Kufuor (2001 — 2009)	Anthony K. Deku	2001 - Jan 2009	Former Commissioner of Police (CID)
John Kufuor (2001 — 2009)	Kwesi Armah	2001 - Jan 2009	Former High Commissioner to the United Kingdom and a Barrister-at-Law
John Kufuor (2001 — 2009)	Samuel Asante-Antwi	2005 - Jan 2009	Immediate-Past Presiding Bishop of the Methodist Church of Ghana
John Kufuor (2001 — 2009)	Daniel Adzei Bekoe	2001 - Jan 2009	Former Vice Chancellor of the University of Ghana
John Kufuor (2001 — 2009)	Alexander Kwapong	2001 - 2004	former Vice Chancellor of the University of Ghana
John Kufuor (2001 — 2009)	Ama Bame Busia	2001 - Jan 2009	a former Principal Domestic Bursar, University of Ghana
John Kufuor (2001 — 2009)	Gifty Afenyi-Dadzie	2005- Jan 2009	Past President of the Ghana Journalists Association and a member of the Media Commission
John Kufuor (2001 — 2009)	Cecilia Bannerman	2005- Jan 2009	Former Minister of Mines
John Kufuor (2001 — 2009)	Adisa Munkaila	2001 - 2005	Former Minister for Labour, Youth and Social Welfare (1981) & Secretary for Labour and Social Welfare (PNDC)
=== Ex-Officio members ===
Position	Name	Term	Comments
former Chief Justice of Ghana	Georgina Theodora Wood	June 2017 – 6 Jan 2025	Appointed by Nana Akufo-Addo
former Chief of the Defence Staff	General J.B. Danquah	Feb 2017 – 6 Jan 2025	Appointed by Nana Akufo-Addo
former Chief of the Defence Staff	Seth Kofi Obeng	March 2013 - Jan 2017	Appointed by John Mahama
former Chief of the Defence Staff	Lt General Arnold Quainoo	2009-Jan 2013	former member of PNDC; Appointed by John Atta Mills
former Chief of the Defence Staff	Major-General Edwin Sam	2001 - Jan 2009	Appointed by John Kufuor
former IGP	Nana Owusu-Nsiah	Feb 2017 – 6 Jan 2025	Appointed by Nana Akufo-Addo
former IGP	Christopher Komla Dewornu	March 2013 - 6 Jan 2017	Appointed by John Mahama
former IGP	Peter Nanfuri	2009 - 6 Jan 2013	Appointed by John Atta Mills
former IGP	Kwaku Kyei	2001 - 6 Jan 2009	Appointed by John Kufuor
President, National House Of Chiefs	Togbe Afede XIV	2016 - 2020	
President, National House Of Chiefs	John Naa Sebiyam Nabila	2008 - 2016	Chief of the Kpasenkpe traditional area and retired academic, University of Ghana
President, National House Of Chiefs	Odeneho Gyapong Ababio II	2001 - 2008	Omanhene of Sefwi-Bekwai Traditional Area
President, National House Of Chiefs	Odeefuo Boaponsem	1999 - 2001	Denkyirahene
President, National House Of Chiefs	Poure Puobe VII	1999	Paramount chief of Nandom
President, National House Of Chiefs	Osagyefo Kuntunkununku II	1998 - 1999	Okyenhene, Paramount chief of Akyem - Abuakwa
President, National House Of Chiefs	Nana Oduro Nimapau II	1993 - 1998	Paramount chief of Esumeja (Esumejahene); President of National House of Chiefs from 1992 to 1998
=== Other past members ===
Position	Name	Term	Comments
	Mumuni Bawumia	1993 - 2001	former Chairman of the Council of State
	Fati Jawula		Rawlings government era
	Ramatu Baba		Nkrumah government era
	Eric Kwamina Otoo	1993 - ?	Former diplomat
	Susanna Al-Hassan	1993 - ?	First female Ghanaian minister
	Annie Jiagge	1993 - 1996	First female judge in Ghana
	Mary Grant	1993 - 2001	Doctor and former minister
	Daasebre Oti Boateng	1993 - ?	Omanhene of New Juaben and former Government Statistician
