= Education in Ghana =

Ministry of Education Ministry of Higher Education

National education budget (2018)
- Budget: 18% of government expenditure

General details
- Primary languages: English
- System type: National

Literacy (2018)
- Total: 79.04%
- Male: 78.3%
- Female: 65.3%

Enrollment (2012/2013)
- Total: 8,329,177
- Primary: Pre-primary: 1,604,505, Primary: 4,105,913, JHS: 1,452,585
- Secondary: SHS and TVI: 904,212
- Post secondary: 261,962 (including universities: 109,278)^{‡}
- ‡: statistics for 2011/2012

Education in Ghana uses a dualistic approach encompassing formal and informal learning systems. The formal educational system was introduced during European colonisation. Learning systems existed prior to that. The University of Moliyili is a learning center established in the 1700s. During colonisation, European settlers initially introduced a formal education system addressed to the elites, while education of the average citizen was mainly informal, and based on apprenticeship. Economic activities in pre-colonial Ghana were based on farm produce shared within households and members of each household specialized in providing necessities such as cooking utilities, shelter, clothing, and furniture, and trade with other households was therefore practiced on a smaller scale.

Education indicators in Ghana reflect disparities between gender, rural and urban areas, and the Southern and Northern parts of the country. These disparities drive public action against illiteracy and inequities in access to education. Eliminating illiteracy has been a key objective of Ghanaian education policy for 40 years, and the difficulty of ensuring equitable access to education is likewise acknowledged by authorities. Public action in both domains has yielded results judged significant while not sufficient by national experts and international organizations.

The Human Rights Measurement Initiative (HRMI) finds that when taking into consideration Ghana's income level, the nation is achieving 76.2% of what should be possible based on its resources (income) for primary education and 65.1% for secondary education.

== History ==
The University of Moliyili is established in the 1700s, and supported by funds from the Yaa Naa, the king of Dagbon, who acted as its royal patron. This learning center was abandoned during the German invasion. For some Ghanaian societies in the pre-colonial times, education in was informal; knowledge and competencies were transmitted orally and through apprenticeships. The arrival of European settlers during the brought new forms of learning. Formal schools were built, which provided book-based education. Their audience was composed of local elites (mulattos, sons of local chiefs, and more wealthy traders) and their presence was limited to colonial forts on the coasts.

=== Castle schools ===
The Portuguese's intention to establish schools was expressed in imperial instruction in 1529 that encouraged the Portuguese governor at Elmina Castle to teach reading, writing, and the Catholic religion to the people. Castle Schools on the Gold Coast included one operated by the Danish at Osu Castle, formerly known as Fort Christianborg. Others were a Dutch school at Elmina Castle (following its capture) and a British school at Cape Coast Castle.

=== 18th century ===
In 1765, Philip Quaque set up a school in his house at Cape Coast which later became the first formal elementary school in Ghana. The Philip Quaque Boys School has produced graduates such as; former Speaker of Parliament, Ebenezer Begyina Sekyi Hughes, former Chief of Staff under ex-President Jerry John Rawlings’ administration, Nana Ato Dadzie, and Oguaa Omanhen, Osabarima Kwesi Atta II. The school's motto, written in Fante dialect, is "Nyansa ahyese ne Nyamesuro" which translates as "The fear of the Lord is the beginning of Wisdom."

=== 19th century ===
After settling in Kumasi in 1807, Muhammed al-Ghamba – the head of the Muslim community of the Ashanti Empire, built a school in the 19th century. By 1819, the school had accommodated 70 students with Asantehene Osei Bonsu serving as the patron of the school. The 19th century saw the increasing influence of missionaries. With the arrival of more missions into the country came an explosion in mission schools across southern Ghana. The Wesleyan and Basel missionaries established schools in Cape Coast, Accra, Anomabu, Dixcove, Akropong, and all along the coast between the 1830s and 1850s. In 1831 two Ashanti princes – Owusu Kwantabisa, son of Osei Yaw Akoto, and Owusu Ansah, son of Osei Bonsu – were sent to Cape Coast Castle school to be educated at the expense of Captain George Maclean, then the governor of the Gold Coast. The two princes were later sent to England for further studies. By the 1840s, Wesleyan missionaries had moved to Kumasi to establish missionary schools.

By the turn of the century, Great Britain had gained influence over Ghanaian territories that led to the establishment of the Gold Coast Colony in 1874. With it came a growing number of mission schools and merchant companies, the Wesleyan and the Basel missions being the most prominent. The Wesleyan mission stayed on the coasts with English as their main language. The Basel mission expanded deeper inland and used vernacular languages as the medium of proselytizing. With the support of the British government, missions flourished in a decentralized system that left some room for pedagogical freedom. Missions remained the main provider of formal education until independence.

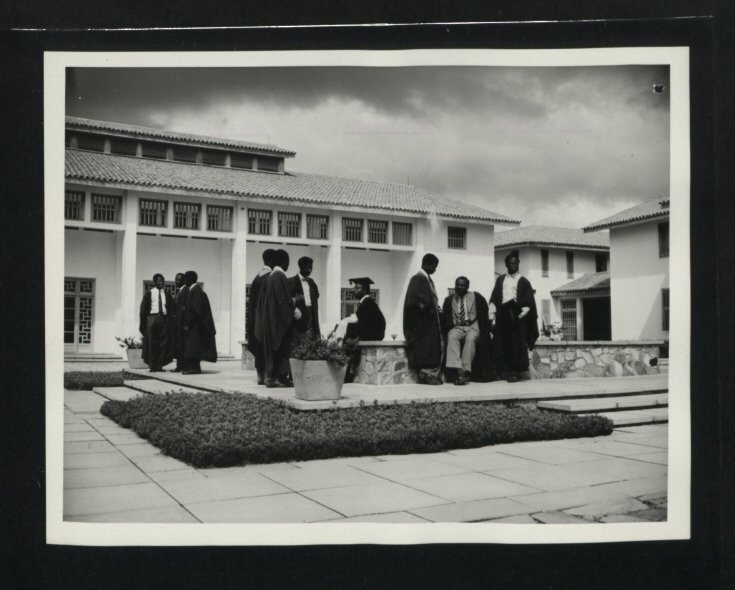
January 1957: students with a senior tutor outside Legon Hall, one of the Halls of Residence at the University College of the Gold Coast (later the University of Ghana) near Accra

=== 20th–21st century ===
Ghana obtained its independence in 1957. The government of Nkrumah described education as the key to the future and announced a high-level university providing an "African point of view", backed by a free universal basic education. In 1961, the Education Act introduced the principle of free and compulsory primary education, and the Kwame Nkrumah University of Science and Technology was established. As a result, the enrollment almost doubled the next year. This expansion was "hard to handle; Ghana quickly fell short of trained teachers" and the quality of the curriculum (specifically in English and Mathematics) was questioned. The fall of Nkrumah in 1966 was followed by stronger criticisms toward the expansion of education at the cost of quality. While there was an increase of school infrastructure, enrollment declined until 1973. The year 1974 saw attempts at reforms. Following the Dozbo committee report, they followed two goals: reducing the length of pre-tertiary education (which led to the creation of a primary/junior/senior school system) and modifying programmes to promote more practical lessons at school. These reforms were partially implemented due to financial limitations and political instability. The country's economic situation worsened at the beginning of the 1980s. Undergoing an economic downturn, the country was failing at solving the deficit of teachers, maintaining school infrastructure, and convincing parents to send their children into school instead of the workforce. The Gross Enrolment Ratio (GER) dropped sharper in response, falling below 70% in 1985.

The year 1987 marked the beginning of a new series of reforms: the military coup of Jerry Rawlings in 1981 had been followed by a period of more political stability and opened the way to broader international support. The Rawlings government had gathered enough funds from countries and international organizations (including the World Bank) to afford changes to the education system. The 1987 Education Act aimed at turning the 1974 Dozbo committee's measures into reality: a national literacy campaign was launched, pre-tertiary education was reduced from 17 to 12 years and vocational education appeared in junior high schools. Education was made compulsory from the ages of 6 to 14. The reform succeeded in imposing a new education structure, and in increasing enrollment and the number of schools. Yet the promise of universal access to basic education was not fulfilled. Vocational programmes were also considered a failure. The return to constitutional rule in 1992, still under Rawlings government, gave a new impulse by reclaiming the duty of the state to provide a free and compulsory basic education for all. The local government Act of 1993 initiated the decentralization in education administration, by transferring power to district assemblies. The Free, Compulsory and Universal Basic Education (FCUBE) provided an action plan for the period 1996–2005, focusing on bridging the gender gap in primary schools, improving teaching materials, and improving teachers' living conditions. It was later completed through acts like the creation of the Council for Technical and Vocational Education and Training in 2006 (to promote vocational education), and the founding of the national accreditation board in 2007, introducing a national accreditation for all tertiary level institutions. In 2007–08, the two years in kindergarten were added to the FCUBE (which is later from the ages of 4 to 14).

Evolution of enrollment and infrastructures in compulsory education since 1968
	1968 (public sector only)	1988	2001	2007	2012
Pupils	1,397,026	x	4,154,374	5,024,944	7,465,208
Teachers	47,880	97,920	155,879	229,144	268,619
Schools	x	x	32,501	46,610	56,919

== Epistemic legacies and decolonial critiques ==
Scholarly critique emphasised that colonial education in Ghana not only introduced formal schooling system but also reshaped system of knowledge production and validation. Colonial curricula empasized European history, languages, and epistemologies, sometimes marginalising indigenous knowledge systems, oral traditions, and local languages. This process has been described within broader discussions of the "decolonisation of knowledge," which critiques the dominance of Eurocentric frameworks in education and intellectual life.

Following independence in 1957, education reforms under Kwame Nkrumah sought to reorient schooling toward national development and African identity. Policies such as the 1961 Education Act expanded access to education and facilitated a more inclusive national curriculum. Scholars note that while these reforms increased enrolment and institutional capacity, some structural features of colonial education remained embedded, including examination systems, language hierarchies, and disciplinary frameworks.

Contemporary research highlights ongoing debated about the extent to which Ghana's education system has moved beyond colonial epistemologies. Some scholars argue that curricula continue to priortise standardised knowledge and assessment models inherited from colonial systems, while others emphasise efforts to incorporate local knowledge, cultural studies, and civic education.

== Statistics ==
Ghana's spending on education has been around 25% of its annual budget in the past decade.

The Ghanaian education system from kindergarten to undergraduate level takes 20 years.

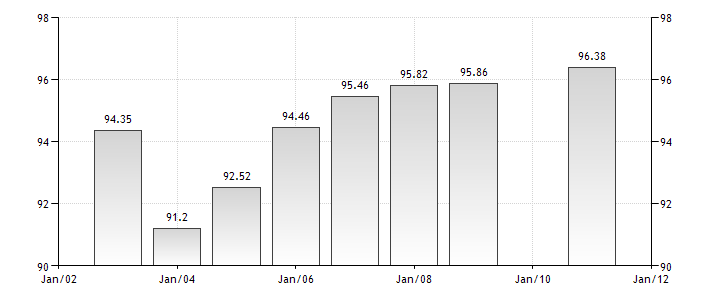
Ratio of females to males in education system.

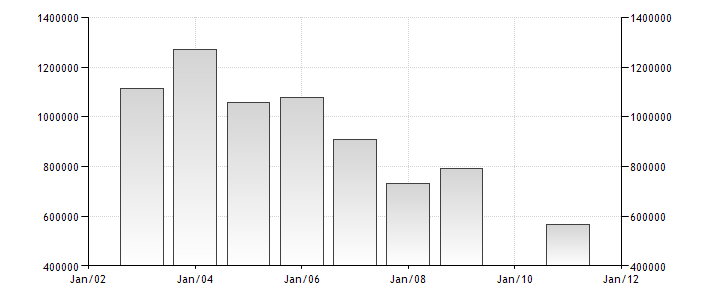
Females and males out of education system.

Ghana scored 1 on the UNESCO Gender Parity Index (GPI) for Primary and Secondary school levels in 2013. The adult (15 and older) literacy rate in Ghana was 79.04% in 2018, with females at 74.47% and males at 83.53%. Ghana's shift from an informal economy to a formal economy made education a political objective. The magnitude of the task, and economic difficulties and political instabilities, have slowed down attempted reforms. The Education Act of 1987, followed by the Constitution of 1992, gave a new impulse to educational policies in the country. In 2011, the primary school net enrollment rate was 84%, described by UNICEF as "far ahead" of the sub-Saharan average. In its 2013–14 report, the World Economic Forum ranked Ghana 46th out of 148 countries for education system quality. In 2010, Ghana's literacy rate was 71.5%, with a gap between women (65.3%) and men (78.3%). The Guardian newspaper disclosed in April 2015 that 90% of children in Ghana were enrolled in school, ahead of countries like Pakistan and Nigeria at 72% and 64% respectively. The literacy rate of females and males aged 15–24 in Ghana was 81% in 2010, with females at 80%, and males at 82%.

Since 2008, enrollment has continually increased at all levels of education (pre-primary, primary, secondary, and tertiary education). With 84% of its children in primary school, Ghana has a school enrollment "far ahead" of its sub-Saharan neighbors. The number of educational institutions has increased in the same period. Vocational education (in TVET institutes, not including SHS vocational and technical programmes) is the only exception, with an enrollment decrease of 1.3% and the disappearance of more than 50 institutions between the years 2011/12 and 2012/2013. This drop would be the result of the lower prestige of vocational education and the lack of demand from industry.

Enrollment and GER in pre-tertiary(2012/2013)
	KG	Prim	JHS	SHS	TVET
Enrollment	1,604,505	4,105,913	1,452,585	842,587	61,496
GER in %	113.8	105.0	82.2	36.8	2.7

Number of structures in pre-tertiary education (2012/2013)
	KG	Prim	JHS	SHS	TVET
Public	13,305	14,112	8,818	535	107
Private	5,972	5,742	3,618	293	74
Total	19,277	19,854	12,436	828	181

Ministry of Education statistics showed 261,962 tertiary students during the 2011/2012 schoolyear: 202,063 in the public sector and 59,899 in the private sector, attending 142 institutions.

== Structure of formal education ==
=== Overview ===
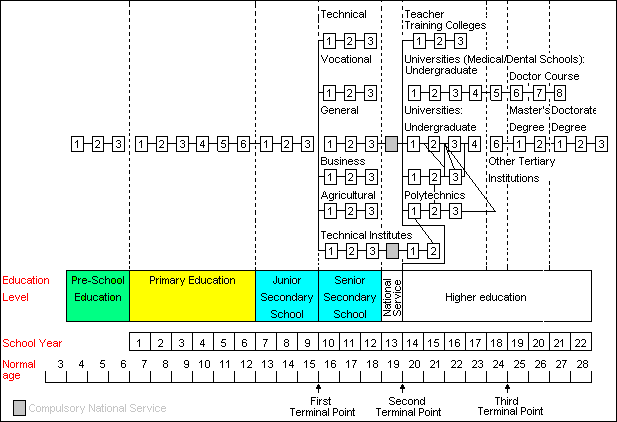
Education structure of Ghana

The Ghanaian education system is divided in three parts: basic education, secondary education, and tertiary education. The academic year usually goes from August to May inclusive and lasts 40 weeks in primary and senior high school, and 45 weeks in junior high school. Lessons are taught primarily in English.

=== Basic education ===
Basic education lasts 12 years (ages 4–15). The curriculum is free and compulsory and is defined as "the minimum period of schooling needed to ensure that children acquire basic literacy, numeracy, and problem-solving skills as well as skills for creativity and healthy living". It is divided into kindergarten, primary school and junior high school (JHS), which ends on the Basic Education Certificate Examination (BECE).

Kindergarten lasts two years (ages 4–6). The programme is divided into six core areas: Language and Literacy (Language Development), Creative Activities (Drawing and Writing), Mathematics (Number Work), Environmental Studies, Movement and Drama (Music and Dance), and Physical Development (Physical Education).

Primary school lasts six years (ages 6–11). The courses taught at the primary or basic school level include English, Ghanaian languages and Ghanaian culture, ICT, mathematics, environmental studies, social studies, Mandarin and French (as Ghana is an OIF associated-member), integrated or general science, pre-vocational skills and pre-technical skills, religious and moral education, and physical activities such as Ghanaian music and dance, and physical education. There is no certificate of completion at the end of primary school.

Junior high school lasts three years (ages 12–15). JHS ends with the BECE, which covers English language, Ghanaian language and culture, social studies, integrated science, mathematics, design and technology, ICT, French (optional), and religious and moral Education.

=== Secondary education ===
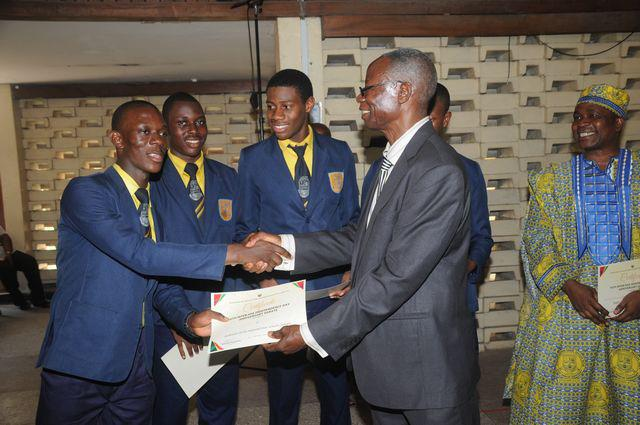
Pope John Senior High School and Minor Seminary students receiving their WASSCE upon graduation prior to entering university

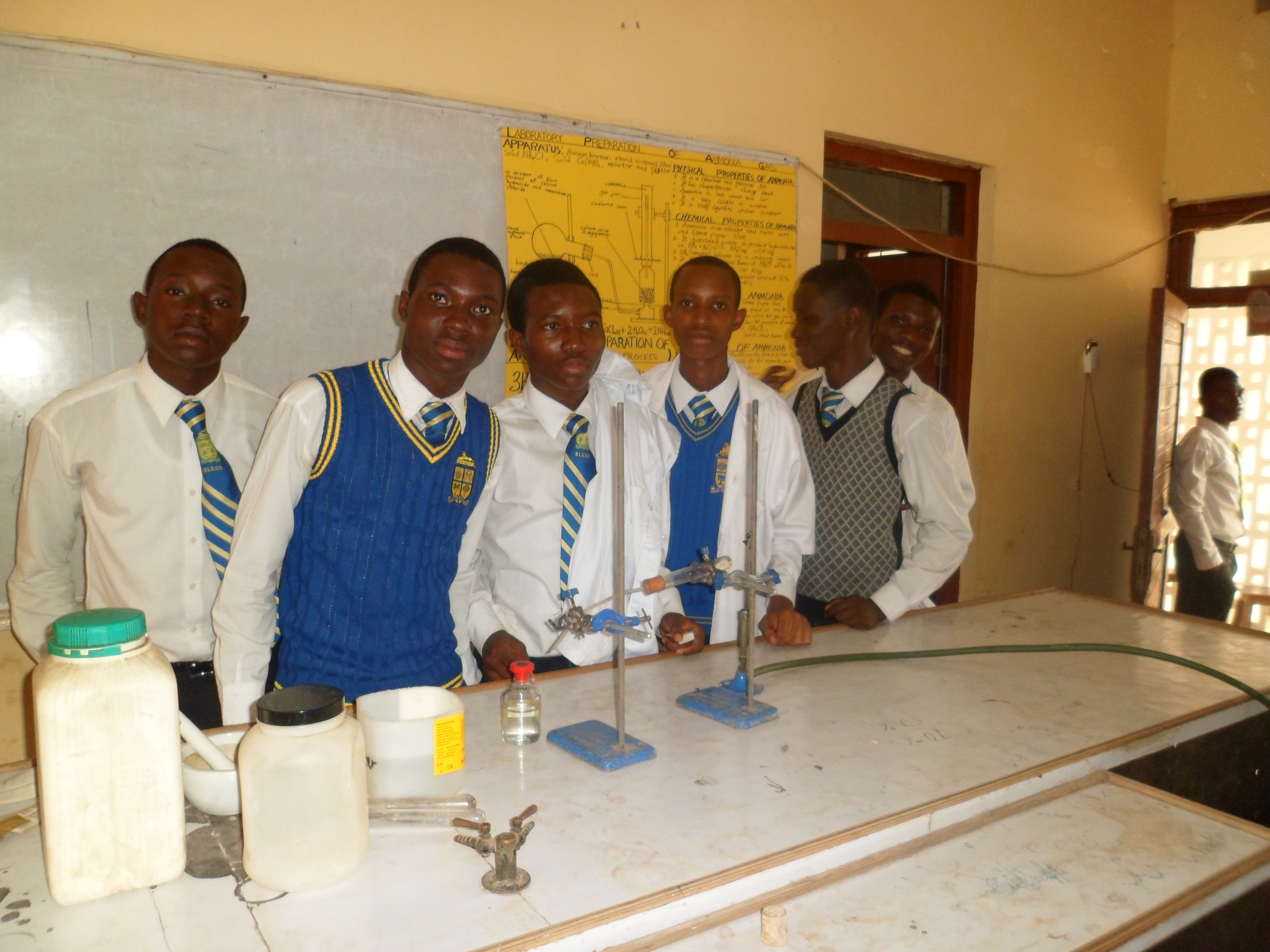
Accra Academy students performing science experiments

For academic education, students enter senior high school (SHS). The SHS curriculum is composed of core subjects, completed by elective subjects (chosen by the students). The core subjects are English language, mathematics, integrated science (including science, ICT and environmental studies) and social studies (economics, geography, history and government). The students then choose three or four elective subjects from five available programmes: agricultural, arts or science, business, vocational and technical programmes.

This curriculum lasts three years, as a result of reforms: it was extended to four years in 2007 then reverted to three years in 2009. The length of the SHS is a disputed question.

The SHS ends on a final exam called the West African Senior School Certificate Examination (WASSCE), formerly called the Senior Secondary School Certificate (SSSC) before 2007. An SHS ranking is established every year by the Statistics, Research, Information, Management and Public Relations (SRIMPR) division of the Ministry of Education, based on the WASSCE results.

Vocation and technical education (also called "TVET") takes different forms. Students wishing to pursue vocational education have two options: entering SHS and taking vocational programmes as electives, or joining a technical and vocational institute (TVI). SHS students follow the usual SHS three-year curriculum. They can then – following sufficient WASSCE results – join a university or polytechnic programme. TVI students usually follow a four-year curriculum, divided into two cycles of two years, leading to awards from City & Guilds, the Royal Society of Arts or the West African Examinations Council. They can then pursue a polytechnic programme.

The state of vocational education in Ghana remains somewhat obscure: 90% of vocational education is still informal, taking the form of apprenticeship. The offer of formal vocational programmes within the private sector is "hard to define" and the Ministry of Education recognizes its incapacity to provide public vocational programmes. Some ministries have their own programmes.

Some international schools exist in Ghana, including the Takoradi International School, Galaxy International School, The Roman Ridge School, Ghana International School, Lincoln Community School, Faith Montessori School, American International School, Association International School, New Nation School, SOS Hermann Gmeiner International College and International Community School. These offer the International Baccalaureat, Advanced Level General Certificate of Education and the International General Certificate of Secondary Education (IGCSE).

=== Tertiary education ===
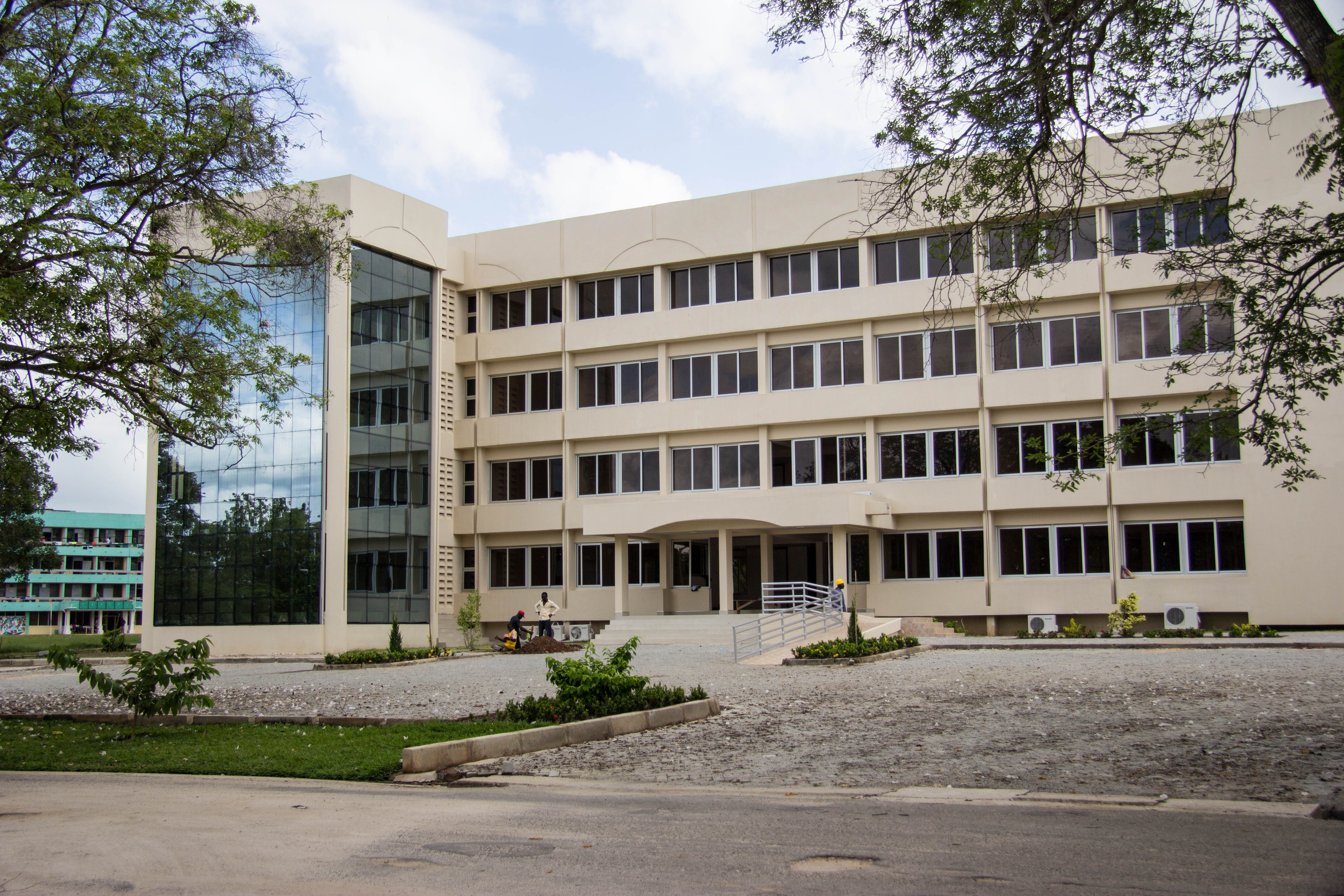
Front view of the University of Education, Winneba (UEW) North Campus in Winneba.

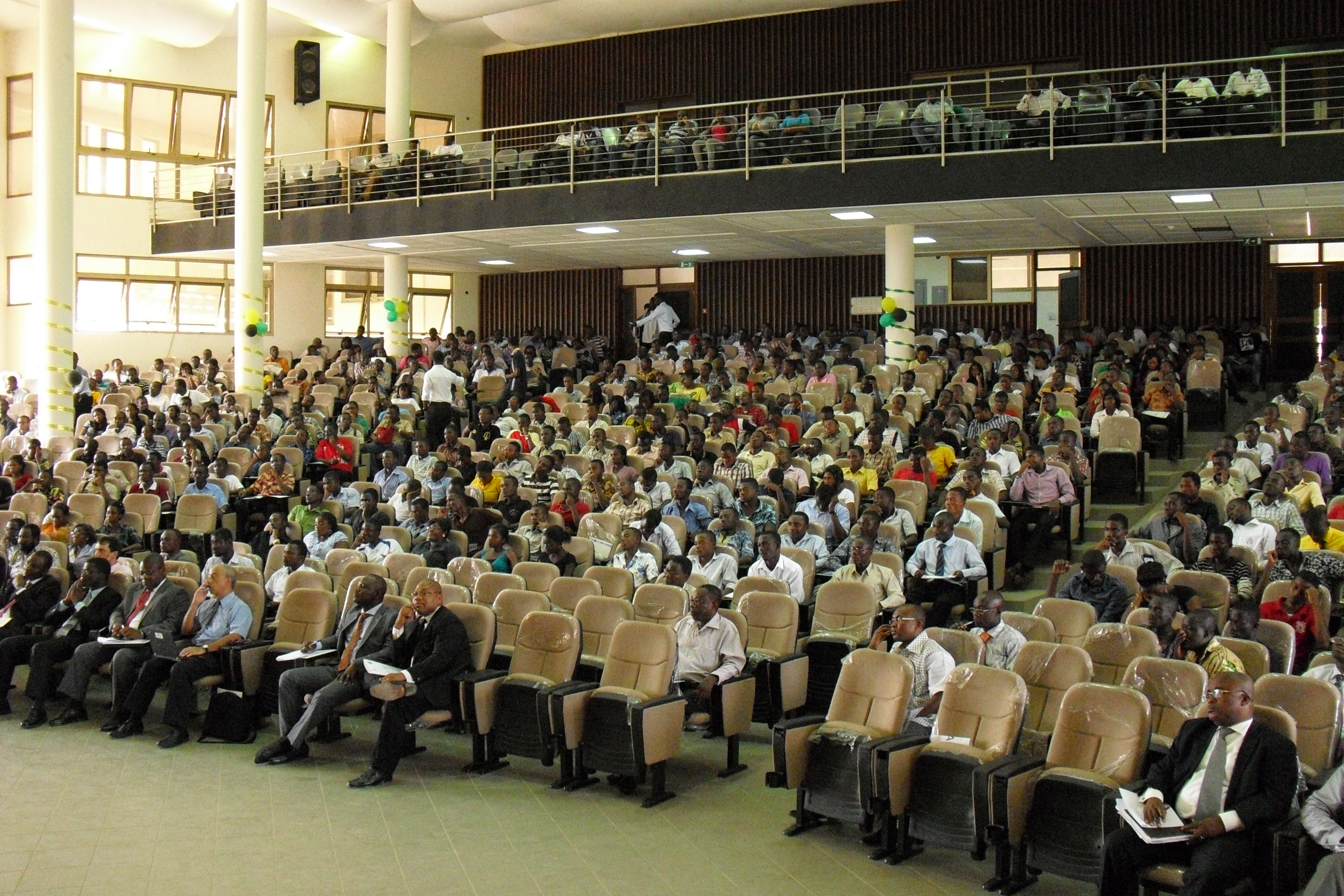
Ghana University students at the Kwame Nkrumah University of Science and Technology (KNUST) in Kumasi, February 2011.

Tertiary education in Ghana has been growing for 20 years, in terms of enrollment and institutions. A part of this development come from the private sector.

Universities (6 public and 49 private institutions) offer an academic education, from bachelor to PhD. Students are admitted based on their performance at the WASSCE – a maximum of 24 points is generally required to apply to a bachelor's degree programme (see "Grading system" below). A bachelor's degree is usually completed after four years of majoring in a specific field. Master's degrees are of two sorts: a one-year programme concluded with a final paper based on a literature study, or a two-year programme, concluded with a final paper based on one year of independent research. Both can lead to a PhD, usually achieved in three years within a doctoral programme.

There are ten polytechnics in Ghana, which offer three-year vocational curricula leading to a Higher National Diploma (HND). Students can then follow a 18-month programme to achieve a Bachelor of Technology degree.

Ghana also possesses "colleges of education", public or private. They are usually specialized in one field – colleges of agriculture, nurse training colleges, teacher training colleges, etc.

New tertiary education graduates have to serve one year within the National Service. Participants can serve in one of the following seven sectors: agriculture, health, education, local government, rural development, military or youth programmes.

During the coronavirus pandemic, some universities in Ghana took up Educational Technology to enable virtual learning and distance learning. While ICTs have been a part of the education system in Ghana, a 2022 survey revealed the challenges of COVID-driven virtual learning in undergraduate programs at Ghanaian public universities. Challenges included a lack of commitment from educators and students towards virtual learning, incomplete knowledge about the learning platforms used, and poor communication between universities and students regarding the learning platforms.

Admission into tertiary education

For admission into colleges of education, applicants are required to make a payment of ₵115.5, to acquire a Personal identification number (PIN) and an admission application serial number to be used to access and fill an online application form. Applicants would then select three colleges of their choice for their program in order of preference, on the online application form. In the event that they do not gain admission into the first choice, the second and third choice may be considered.

=== Grading system ===
Ghana's grading system is different at every point in education. Through the kindergarten to the junior high, every grade a student gains is written in terms of numbers. Unlike lettered grading systems, there is no system of pluses and minuses (i.e. no 1+ or 6- grades).

Senior high school

Until 2007, senior secondary high school ended with the Senior Secondary School Certificate (SSSC). Its grading system went from A to E. In 2007, the SSSC was replaced by the WASSCE. The WASSCE grading system adds numbers to the letters, offering a larger scale of evaluation. In both systems, each grade refers to a certain number of points. To join a bachelor's degree programme, applicants are usually asked not to exceed 24 points at their WASSCE.

Senior Secondary High School grading system
SSSCE grades (before 2007), [in points]	WASSCE grades (since 2007), [in points]	Description
A[1]	A1[1]	Excellent
B[2]	B2[2]	Very good
C[3]	B3[3]	Good
D[4]	C4[4]	Credit
	C5[5]	Credit
	C6[6]	Credit
E	D7	Pass
	E8	Pass
F	F9	Fail

Tertiary education

The grading system varies between institutions.

== Private education and private-public partnership ==
The Ghanaian government cannot bear alone the costs of education, so private institutions exist to assist in providing education. It is incapable of providing increasing educational services so education has become a shared effort by the government and private institutions, in order to make up for financial inefficiency on the side of the government and make education accessible to all. There is a call for public-private partnerships in education in most developing countries due to the growing involvement of private entities in education.

The structure of this joint effort by the public and private sectors to address the problem of financing education at the basic or elementary level is as follows:

Agency	Role
Public sector	
Central Government	Responsible for remuneration of teachers who teach in public schools Responsible for the provision of free textbooks for pupils in public schools, from primary 1 to 6 Responsible for the provision of supplies, equipment and tools needed for basic public schools
District Assemblies	Provide educational infrastructure
Private sector	
Parents	Responsible for payment of textbook user fees for children at the junior high school level Responsible for furniture, food, and transportation to and from school
Communities	Classroom maintenance and provision
Churches and NGOs	Provide basic school buildings and structure, furniture
Private Institutions/Individuals	Founding and managing private schools solely operated by founders, without any financial or infrastructural help from the government
International Organizations	Provide financial and technical assistance for basic education in Ghana

Private involvement in education has affected education in Ghana; private primary and junior high schools outnumber public schools. 74.7% of 779 primary and junior secondary schools were identified as private schools in a census conducted in Ga district, while the remaining 25.3% were identified as government or public schools. Over the past 20 years, the number of students in developing countries attending private schools has increased from 11% to 22%.

== Governance ==
=== Administration ===
Education in Ghana is under the responsibility of the Ministry of Education. Policy implementation is assumed by its agencies; the Ghana Education Service (GES) is responsible for the coordination of national education policy on pre-tertiary education. It shares this task with three autonomous bodies: the National Schools Inspectorate Authority (NaSIA, formerly the NIB), the National Teaching Council (NTC) and the National Council for Curriculum and Assessment (NCCA). The terminal examinations of the pre-tertiary education are conducted by the West African Examination Council (National Office, Ghana) which includes the BECE and the WASCCE, and foreign professional examinations. The Council for Technical and Vocational Education and Training is dedicated to the management of TVET. The collection and analysis of educational data is handled by the Education Management Information System (EMIS).

Policies are implemented in cooperation with the local offices. Ghana is divided into 16 regions and 230 district offices. The Ghana Education Decentralization Project (GEDP), launched in 2010 and ended in 2012, has increased the influence of local authorities over management, finance, and operational issues when it comes to educational matters.

=== Financing ===
The Ghanaian State dedicated 23% of its expenditure to education in 2010. More than 90% of this budget is spent by the Ministry of Education and its agencies, with primary education (31% of the expenditure) and tertiary education (21.6%) receiving the most. The expenditures are partly funded by donors. Among them are the World Bank, the United States (through USAID), the United Kingdom (through the DfID) and the European Union. Their participation is usually project-focused and granted under certain conditions, giving them a certain influence. This influence can provoke debates when it comes to key-reforms: for the FCUBE project, the World Bank imposed book charges in primary schools and reduced feeding and boarding costs in secondary schools. Facing criticisms, the Bank insisted on the “strong domestic ownership” of the reform and the necessity to ensure “cost recovery”. Between 2005 and 2012, donor contributions to the education budget has fallen from 8.5% to 2.5% of total expenditure.

=== Teacher training ===
Colleges of Education (CoE) are the main teacher training institutions. There are 46 public CoE across all regions of Ghana. They offer a three-year curriculum that leads to the Diploma in Basic Education (DBE). The curriculum is described as "uniform" and with a "national focus" even if CoE are present in every Ghanaian region. The final examinations granting the DBE are conducted by the public University of Cape Coast's Institute of Education. The holders of the DBE are allowed to teach at every level of basic education (kindergarten, primary school, junior secondary school).

Apart from the CoE, two universities (Cape Coast and Winneba) also train teachers. A specific four-year bachelor's degree allows to teach in any pre-tertiary education (most graduates choose secondary education). A specific master's degree is needed for teaching in CoE. Universities also offer DBE graduates a two-year curriculum granting the right to teach in secondary education.

Distance education is also possible via a four-year programme leading to the Untrained Teacher's Diploma in Basic Education (UTDBE). It was introduced to increase the number of basic education teachers in the rural area. Serving teachers can also continue education programmes at the school, cluster and regional levels.

== Public action and policies ==
=== Adult literacy, non-formal education ===
Public action against illiteracy started for more than 50 years in Ghana. Initiated in the 1940s by the British rulers, it was raised to top-priority after Ghana's independence in 1957. Political unrest limited this action to sporadic short-term programmes, until 1987 and the creation of the Non-Formal Education Division (NFED), whose goal was to eliminate illiteracy by 2000. After a convincing trial in two regions, the Functional Literacy Skills Project (FLSP) was expanded to the whole country in 1992. In 2000, the programme was taken over by the National Functional Literacy Programme (FNLP). These programmes focus on gender and geographical inequalities. Women and people living in rural area are their main targets. In 2004, there were 1238 "Literacy centers", mostly in non-urban areas.

The successive projects led to statistical progress. In 1997, 64% of women and 38% of men were illiterate, with a global literacy rate of 54%. In 2010, female literacy was 65% and the global literacy rate had increased to 71.5%. Academics pointed out the insufficient progress of literacy among women and the difficulty for those who graduated to upkeep their new skills.

Evolution of literacy rate over time
	Adult literacy(15+)			Youth literacy (15–24)		
	Av	M	F	Av	M	F
2000	57.9	66.4	49.8	70.7	75.9	65.4
2010	71.5	78.3	65.3	85.7	88.3	83.2
2015(projection)	76.3	81.5	71.0	90.6	91.3	89.9

Other forms of non-formal education are also conducted by the NFED, such as "Life-skills training" (family planning, hygiene, AIDS prevention) targeting adolescents and young mothers, occupational skills training for unemployed adults and civil awareness seminars (on civil rights and duties) addressed to illiterate adults.

=== Development of technical and vocational education ===
Developing TVET is considered a priority by central authorities to tackle poverty and unemployment.

TVET in Ghana faces problems: low completion rates (in 2011, 1.6% of the population got a TVET degree whereas 11% of the population followed a TVET programme), poorly trained instructors and a lack of infrastructure. Ghanaian industries criticize the lack of practical experience of formal graduates, and the lack of basic skills (reading and writing) of informal apprentices. In 2008, the OECD reproached the opacity of the qualifications framework and the multiplication of worthless TVET certificates. The Council for Technical and Vocational Education and Training (COTVET) observed that both informal and graduated TVET students struggle to find a job, and then have to deal with income volatility or low wages. TVET, therefore, suffers from a poor reputation among students, parents and employers.

In 2005, a micro-credit system in favor of low-skilled unemployed youth was implemented (the STEP programme). In 2006, the COTVET was created and entrusted with the mission of coordinating TVET policies in Ghana. The council introduced a National Youth Fund in 2006, and proposed a TVET qualifications framework in 2010. It also tries to frame the informal sector through a National Apprenticeship Programme (NAP) and to strengthen guidance and counselling at the basic education level.

The impacts are "difficult to assess": 90% of training is informal and the public and private sectors are segmented. The Ministry of Education itself admits its incapacity to provide a statistical view of the TVET sector in Ghana.

=== Equity in access to tertiary education ===
With the national rise in enrollment in secondary schools, competition for joining institutions of higher education has also increased. In 2001, the University of Ghana admitted 96% of the relevant applications it received, whereas in 2011 the acceptance rate had fallen to 52%. This increasing selectivity highlights inequalities in Ghana regarding education, as women and rural Ghanaians are underrepresented within tertiary school students. Socioeconomic status is also a factor of exclusion, as studying at the highest level is expensive – public universities are usually tuition-free, but charge for other services including registration, technology access, examinations, use of academic facilities, and medical services. These charges can lead to self-censorship behaviors such as some students choosing Teacher Training Colleges (where students can receive stipends) instead of enrolling in universities.

Policies have been developed to attempt to limit these inequalities. Some universities have lowered their minimum entry requirement or created scholarships for students from "less-endowed secondary schools". A "Girls Education unit" was created within the Ghana Education Service to reduce gender-based disparities. The unit tries to tackle the problem at its source, focusing on basic education to avoid high all-girls school drop-out rates from JHS to SHS. Progress has been made; between 1999 and 2005, the proportion of girls in higher education has increased from 25% to 32%. Women are still underrepresented, for reasons, including hostile school environments, priority given to sons in poor families, the perpetuation of gender roles ("a woman belongs in the house"), early arranged marriages, teenage pregnancy, etc.

Ghanaian students of higher education are predominantly male and wealthy:

HE in Ghana is disproportionately ‘consumed’ by the richest 20% of the population. Male students from the highest income quintile (Q5) are more than seven times more likely to enter and successfully complete HE than those from the poorest quintile (Q1). The situation is even more precarious for the female category where students come from only the richest 40% of the population.

— World Bank 2011, " Education in Ghana: Improving equity, efficiency, and accountability of Education service delivery

On 31 March 2020, the Ghana Scholarship Secretariat launched an online scholarship application and administration system to help eliminate the inconvenience that scholarship applicants experience seeking government sponsorship in education. This system is also designed to help the Secretariat properly and efficiently provide scholarships to applicants. Applicants can apply for scholarships and take the aptitude test online and be interviewed in their own districts without having to travel to Accra, as was required in the past.

=== ICT ===
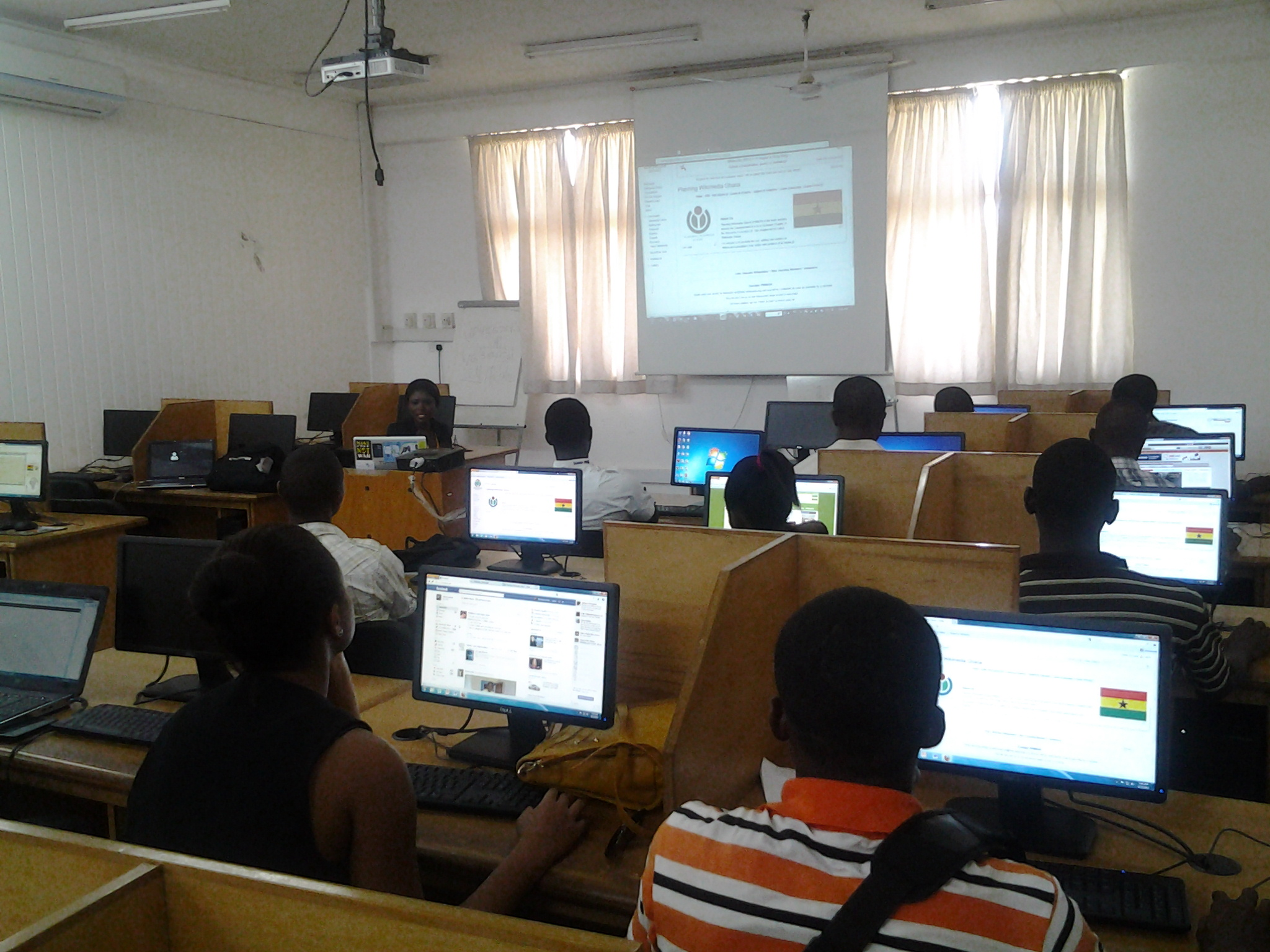
University of Ghana students engaged in a Wikipedia outreach

In the past decade, government attention has shifted to the use of computer technology in teaching and learning. The ICT (Information communication technology) standard in the education policy of Ghana requires the use of ICT for teaching and learning on all levels of the education system. Attempts have been made by the Ministry of Education to support institutions in the teaching of ICT literacy. Most secondary and some primary schools have computer laboratories.

A study on the pedagogical integration of ICTs from 2009 to 2011 in 10 Ghanaian schools indicates that there is a gap between policy directives and actual practices in schools. The emphasis of the official curricula is on the development of students’ skills in operating ICT equipment, and not necessarily using the technology as a means of learning subjects other than the use of the devices. The study also found that the Ministry of Education is attempting to deploy sufficient ICT resources to develop the needed ICT literacy required for computer skills to be integrated into teaching/learning.

== See also ==
- Educate Ghana, a government initiative
- List of colleges of education in Ghana
- List of senior secondary schools in Ghana
- List of universities in Ghana

== Notes ==
- Ministry of Education (July 2013). "Education Sector Performance Report" (PDF). Ministry of Education, Republic of Ghana.
- Atuahene, Ansah (23 July 2013). "A Descriptive Assessment of Higher Education Access, Participation, Equity, and Disparity in Ghana". SAGE Open. 3 (3) 2158244013497725. SageOpen. doi:10.1177/2158244013497725.
- NUFFIC (January 2013). "Country Module: Ghana" (PDF). Netherlands Organisation for International Cooperation in Higher Education. Archived from the original (PDF) on 25 May 2014.
- Nyarko, J. & Serwornoo (19 May 2022). "COVID-19 and Mass Media Education: An Evaluation of the Transition from Brick-and-Mortar Learning to Virtual Space". Journal of Creative Communications. 17 (3). SageOpen: 251–269. doi:10.1177/09732586221096346. S2CID 248953692.
