= Emma Mitchell =

Emma Mitchell may refer to:

- Emma Mukandi (née Mitchell), Scottish footballer
- Emma Mitchell (politician), Ghanaian politician
