= Osagyefo Oseadeeyo Agyeman Badu II =

Ghanaian traditional ruler

- Aduana Piesie
- Reign: 1999 — present
- Successor: Osagyefo Agyemang Badu I
- Born: Daniel Mensah; 27 May 1966 (age 60)

Osagyefo Oseadeeyo Dr. Nana Freduah Agyemang Badu II (born Daniel Mensah, 27 May 1966) is a Ghanaian traditional ruler and the Paramount Chief of the Dormaa Traditional Area (Dormaaman) in Ghana. A grand durbar of chief, dignitaries, parliamentarians, government functionaries, ministers of state, Bonohene of Ivory Coast - Nana Agyeman Adinkrah II and distinguished citizens of Dormaa were present to outdoor Osagyefo, July 25, 1999. He is the President of the Bono Regional House of Chiefs. Osagyefo is the Aduana Piesie which basically means first or leader in Aduana Akan clan. Aside Dormaahene who resides in the Bono region, there are aduana groups all over Ghana. Aduana clan members can be found in the Bono East, eastern region, ahafo, western region, central region and asante region.

== Biography ==
=== Early life ===
Born on May 27, 1966, he was given the name Daniel Mensah. He ascended to the throne at the age of 35, following the passing of his uncle, Osagyefo Oseadeyo Agyemang Badu I.

== Palace ==
Abanpredease (Dormaahene's Palace) is the royal palace of the Omanhene of Dormaa-man. It is located in Dormaa Ahenkro, in the Bono Region of Ghana. The name Abanpredease is also otherwise ascribed to the royal family as well. Abanpredease Palace has social media channels dedicated for activities that takes place at the palace and Osagyefo's official mouth piece - Abanpredease TV.

== Duties ==
As a High Court judge, Osagyefo Oseadeeyo presides over legal matters in a Fast Track High Court in Greater Accra region. He is the current head of the judicial committee at the National House of chiefs. Osagyefo was also appointed as part of the 18 member committee inaugurated by president Mahama, tasked with evaluating mining operations in the forest reserves identifying best industry practices, and proposing strategies to curb mining activities in river bodies in February 2025. The committee will review the country’s mining licensing processes and recommend measures to protect the environment. This multi-stakeholder committee is tasked with evaluating mining operations in forest reserves, identifying best industry practices, and proposing strategies to curb mining activities in river bodies. Additionally, the committee will develop a comprehensive approach to addressing mining-related challenges and suggest further improvements based on their findings. Osagyefo Agyemang Badu II reaffirmed the committee’s dedication to its mandate, assuring the ministers that it would work tirelessly to achieve meaningful outcomes. He also pledged the full support of the National House of Chiefs in the government’s efforts to combat environmental degradation. The committee is expected to deliver actionable recommendations to reform the mining sector, ensuring sustainable and responsible practices for the nation's long-term benefit.

Osagyefo was unanimously re-elected to serve his second term as president of the Bono House of chiefs in October 2024.

https://www.facebook.com/watch/?v=2207346719650704

== Interesting facts ==
The paramount chief of Akwamufie, "Odeneho", in the eastern region is the twin brother of the paramount chief of the Dormaa state, "Afari Sikadwa or Oseadeayo Stool". The uncle to both stools is Nana Ansah Sasraku I of Akwamu (succeeded by Nana Addo Panin and Nana Basua). Dormaa, like Akwamu, had a well-organised army led by an Osaagyefo. The Dormaahene's uncle is the Gyaman chief in Ivory Coast and also Suma-Ahenkro. The Dormaahene is also known as Nyanpon or Nyankopon, Freduah and was the first to use these "nsabranie" or accord such praises in Akan. The Aduana fire or Ogya stays lit in the rain during events held at the palace and elsewhere by the Osagyefo.
