= Civic Ghana =

Government of Ghana initiative

Civic Ghana is a module of NABCO, an initiative set up by the government of Ghana to address graduate unemployment. Its goal is to train graduates to network and promote their services by utilizing social spaces in public and private institutions.
