= Heal Ghana =

Government of Ghana initiative

Heal Ghana is a module of NABCO which is an initiative set up by the government of Ghana to address the graduate unemployment in the country. The module is to provide opportunity to graduates of the health space in the country.
