= Omanhene =

Title of the supreme traditional ruler

In several Akan nations of Ghana, the omanhene (plural amanhene) is the title of a magnate or a supreme traditional ruler in a region or a larger town. The omanhene is the central figure and institution of the nation. Officially, he has no function in the current Ghanaian political setup, but has enormous influence on the people that constitute it. Today 'Hene' can be found in titles of other rulers in Ghanaian nations. For example, the chief of the Dagomba in the north of Ghana is known as the 'Dagombahene'.

The Akan omanhene, collectively the ahemfo, are major land owners, and are the heads of an essentially feudal system. They commit the land they theoretically hold in trust to caretakers.

Amanhene are appointed by ahemma (queen mothers) that are often but not necessarily their birth mothers, but are always a direct matrilineal relative. Dynastic succession tends to follow a matrilineal pattern. The exception to this is found, though, in a few Akan states such as Elmina.

Not all Akan nations have the Omanhene as the supreme ruler. The Ashanti, for example, have as the supreme ruler the asantehene, who is superior to the amanhene of Asanteman.

== Distribution of Omanhenes ==
=== Ahafo Region ===
- Acherensua
- Goaso
- Kukuom
- Akrodie
- Bechem
- Duayaw-Nkwanta
- Hwidiem
- Kenyasi No. 1
- Kenyasi No. 2
- Sankore
- Mim
- Yamfo
- Ntotroso

=== Ashanti Region ===
- Otumfuo, the Asantehene - Otumfuo Nana Osei Tutu II
- Mampong
- Essumeja
- Adansi
- Juaben - Nana Otuo Siriboe II
- Nsuta
- Kumawu
- Kokofu
- Bekwai
- Offinso
- Agona
- Ejisu
- Denyasi
- Asokore
- Agogo - Nana Akuoko Sarpong
- Obogu
- Manso-Nkwanta
- Tepa

=== Bono Region ===
- Banda
- Badu
- Berekum
- Drobo
- Dwenem
- Dormaa - Osagyefo Oseadeeyo Agyeman Badu II
- Japekrom
- Kwatwoma
- Sampa
- Sunyani
- Nsawkaw
- Nsoatre
- Odomase No.1
- Awua Dornase
- Suma
- Seikwa
- Wenchi - Osagyefo Ampem Anyye Amoampong Tabrako III

=== Bono East Region ===
- Nkoranza
- Prang
- Abease
- Adjaade
- Akroso
- Amantin
- Atebubu
- Dwan
- Techiman
- Mo
- Nkomi
- Wiase
- Offuman
- Tanoboase
- Tanoso
- Tuobodom

=== Central Region ===
- Ekumfi
- Enyan-Abaasa
- Ajumako
- Asikuma
- Esiam
- Enyan-Maim
- Mankessim
- Abeadzi
- Kwamankese - Nana Amoako Atta II
- Abura
- Nkusukum
- Anomabo
- Denkyira
- Awutu
- Assin Apimannim
- Agona Nyakrom
- Edina
- Effutu- Ghartey VII of the House of Ghartey
- Gomoa Ajumako
- Gomoa Akyempim
- Hemang
- Oguaa
- Assin-Attadasu
- Twifu
- Komenda
- Eguafo
- Agona Nsaba
- Enyan Denkyira
- Abirem
- Asebu
- Atti Mokwaa
- Effutuakwa
- Senya
- Assin Owirenkyi
- Sanaahene of Oguaa - Nana Kofi Obiri Egyir II

=== Eastern Region ===
- Akyem Abuakwa
- Akyem Bosome
- Akyem Kotoku
- Akwapim
- Akuapem - Oseadeoyo Kwasi Akuffo III
- Akwamu - Odeneho Kwafo Akotto III
- Kwahu
- New Juaben
- Yilo Krobo
- Manya Krobo
- Boso-Gua
- Anum

=== Greater Accra Region ===
- Ga
- Osudoku
- Shai
- Ningo
- Prampram
- Kpone
- Ada
- La
- Ngleshie Alata
- Nungua
- Osu
- Tema
- Teshie

=== Western Region ===
Otumfou Badu Bonsu II of the Ahanta’s

=== Western North Region ===
- Sefwi-Anwiaso - Ogyeahohoo Yaw Gyebi II
- Sefwi-Bekwai - Odeneho Gyapong Ababio
- Sefwi-Wiawso - Katakyie Kwesi Bumagamah II
- Sefwi-Chirano - Okogyeaman Kwaku Gyambra III
- Aowin - Beyeman Brentum III
- Suaman - Odeneho Bentum IV
