= Nana Kofi Obiri Egyir II =

Ghanaian traditional ruler

Council of State
- Incumbent
- Assumed office February 2017
- President: Nana Akuffo-Addo

Personal details
- Born: Ghana

Nana Kofi Obiri Egyir II is a Ghanaian businessman and traditional ruler. He is the Sanaahene of the Oguaa traditional area. He owns the hospitality facility Sanaa Lodge in the Central Region of Ghana. He was appointed to the Council of State by President Nana Addo Dankwa Akuffo-Addo in February 2017. He was once the national treasurer of the Popular Front Party.

== Adult life ==
Nana Kofi Obiri Egyir II spent much of his working life as a businessman with interests mainly in the Ghanaian hospitality industry. His business ventures are mostly in the Central Region of Ghana and includes the Sanaa Lodge, a three star hospitality facility close to the Elmina Castle.

In the 1970s Nana Kofi Obiri Egyir II was elected the national financial secretary of the Popular Front Party. He was installed as the Sanaahene - leader of warriors of the traditional area. As Sanaahene, he aids the Omanhene of the Oguaa traditional area, Osabarimba Kwesi Atta II, in the performance of his duties as well as presiding over the activities of the Asafo groups in the area.

In the 1990s, Nana Kofi Obiri Egyir Il supported the return of many African Americans to Ghana West Africa and coordinated many naming ceremonies along with the elders of the Siwdo Ebiradze Family Of Cape Coast. Additionally, he was responsible for coordinating the induction of Obaapanyin Ama Tetre (Teri Johnson - Washington, DC) as the Queen Mother of the Ebiradze Family of Siwdo on February 20, 1999, who was selected by Nana Tetre, his mother and Queen Mother of the Ebiradze Family of Siwdo. Noted photographer Chester Higgins captured images of this spectacular journey. Based upon oral history, the ancestors of the Ebiradze Family of Siwdo in Cape Coast were those who were rescued from the Trans Atlantic slave trade in Cape Coast Ghana. He had a strong belief in reuniting The Ebiradze Family of Siwdo Of Cape Coast with those of African descent.

In February 2017 Nana Kofi Obiri Egyir II was appointed to the council by President Nana Akuffo-Addo. During the swearing-in ceremony held at The Flagstaff House, President Akuffo-Addo entreated the council to advise him well with the view to always propel Ghana to greater heights. During the handing over ceremony of the sixth session of the council to the seventh, the outgoing council chair, Naa Prof. John S. Nabila, advised the new house to give their best counsel to the new government to ensure that the country and all its citizens would live in prosperity and peace. The appointment of Nana Kofi Obiri Egyir II was gladly received by the people of the Central Region who also pledged their support for him. Some believed that his vast experience in the business world as well as in Ghanaian traditional rule would help the council greatly.

Nana Kofi Obiri Egyir ll died suddenly in 2020 in Ghana.
