= Osagyefo Agyemang Badu I =

Traditional ruler in Ghana

Nana Agyemang Badu I was a traditional ruler in Ghana and Paramount Chief of Dormaa Traditional Area in the Bono Region. His official title was Dormaahene - chief of Dormaa. He was the sixth president of the National House of Chiefs and served from 1978 to 1982. He was also the head of the Brong Ahafo regional House of Chiefs. He was the founding father of the Dormaa Secondary School also known as Dormas which is located in the heart of Dormaa Ahenkro Bono Region. Osagyefo was a close friend of the late Rtd.Ft. Lt.Jerry John Rawlings who was usually seen at the Kwafie Festival. In his private life, Osagyefo was a medical doctor.

Osagyefo visited his ancestors in January 1998. His successor is Dr. Nana Agyemang Badu II, his nephew, who took over in 1999.
