= Cecilia Johnson =

Ghanaian politician (1945 or 1946 – 2025)

Hon. Cecilia Johnson

Local Government & Rural Development
- President: Jerry Rawlings

Local Government & Rural Development
- President: John Atta Mills

Personal details
- Born: 1945 or 1946 Odomase #1, Bono Region
- Died: 22 September 2025 (aged 79)
- Party: National Democratic Congress
- Profession: Politics

Cecilia Johnson (1945 or 1946 – 22 September 2025) was a Ghanaian politician and the Chair of Ghana's Council of State. She was once the General Secretary of 31 December Women's Movement and also the Minister of Local Government. Johnson died after a short illness on 22 September 2025, at the age of 79.
