= Sanaahene =

Sanaahene is the title given to the royal treasurer. The title Sa-hene, is used primarily in Ghana and is given to a traditional ruler who is considered capable of leading the warring groups of the area. The Sa-hene is mandated to aid the paramount chief of an area in the performance of his duty. In the Central Region of Ghana, the Sa-hene has oversight over the Asafo group.

== Popular use ==
- Nana Kofi Obiri Egyir II - Sanaahene of the Oguaa traditional area
- Nana Ogyabia Badu Ehuren - Sanaahen of Swedru
- Dr Esiem Kwaakontan II - Sanaahen of Denkyira Traditional Area
- Nana Gyasi Ataala VII - Sanaahen of Kwamankese
