= Gifty Afenyi-Dadzie =

Ghanaian journalist (born 1957)

- Born: Gifty Afenyi; 17 June 1957 (age 68); Accra, Ghana
- Education: Ghana Institute of Management and Public Administration (MA)
- Occupations: Journalist; Business woman; Media Practitioner; Member of Council of State

Gifty Afenyi Dadzie (born 7 June 1957) is a Ghanaian journalist, media practitioner, businesswoman and was the longest serving president of the Ghana Journalists Association. She is also a member of the COVID-19 Trust Fund Board of Trustees.

== Early life ==
Afenyi Dadzie was born to Mr. J. K. Affenyi, a health inspector and later became the director of the Takoradi Port. Her mother Mrs Charity Affenyi, a trader.

== Education ==
Afenyi Dadzie had her basic education at Tarkwa Methodist Primary School and Mmofraturo Girls' Boarding School in Kumasi. She had her secondary education at Winneba Senior High School in Winneba from 1970 to 1975 in the Central Region of Ghana. She holds a master's degree in Governance and Leadership from Ghana Institute of Management and Public Administration (GIMPA). She also has a Chartered Institute of Administrators fellowship.

== Career ==
Afenyi Dadzie is a journalist by profession. Gifty was the managing director of the 1st African Group a business conglomerate with over three companies in the Ghana Club.

Afenyi Dadzie has served in various capacities on different boards in Ghana and elsewhere some of these include Tender Board, Ministry of Foreign Affairs Advisory Committee, Ghana Institute of Journalism (GIJ), National Media Commission (NMC), Ekumfiman Rural Bank, CDH Insurance, a Kulendi at Law a reputable private legal firm in Accra. In 1993, she became an associate of the Women's Institute for Freedom of the Press (WIFP). WIFP is an American nonprofit publishing organization. The organization works to increase communication between women and connect the public with forms of women-based media. She is currently a Council of State member under President Akuffo - Addo's administration and also a Council of State member with ECOWAS.

She was first woman Vice President and subsequently the President of the Ghana Journalists Association (GJA). She was also the longest serving president after serving for a period of seven years as President(1996 - 2003).

She was appointed a member Council of State in 2005 by the then President John Kufour. She was the youngest person as at then to be appointed to serve on the Council which happens to be the advisory body to the President of Ghana.

She is the National Prayer Director for the Women's Aglow Ministry and interdenominational Christian women's fellowship.

== Awards and recognition ==
She is a recipient of the National Award the Order of Volta. Gifty Afenyi-Dadzie was awarded Personality for the Year 2018 at the Harvest Praise annual gospel music concert organized by Harvest International Ministries (HIM).

== Personal life ==
She is married to Mr. Kwesi Tetteh Dadzie.
