= Educational inequality in Ghana =

Education inequality in Ghana exists in multiple dimensions, with significant disparities occurring along gender, wealth, and geographical divides. However, improvements have been made by both government and civic organizations.

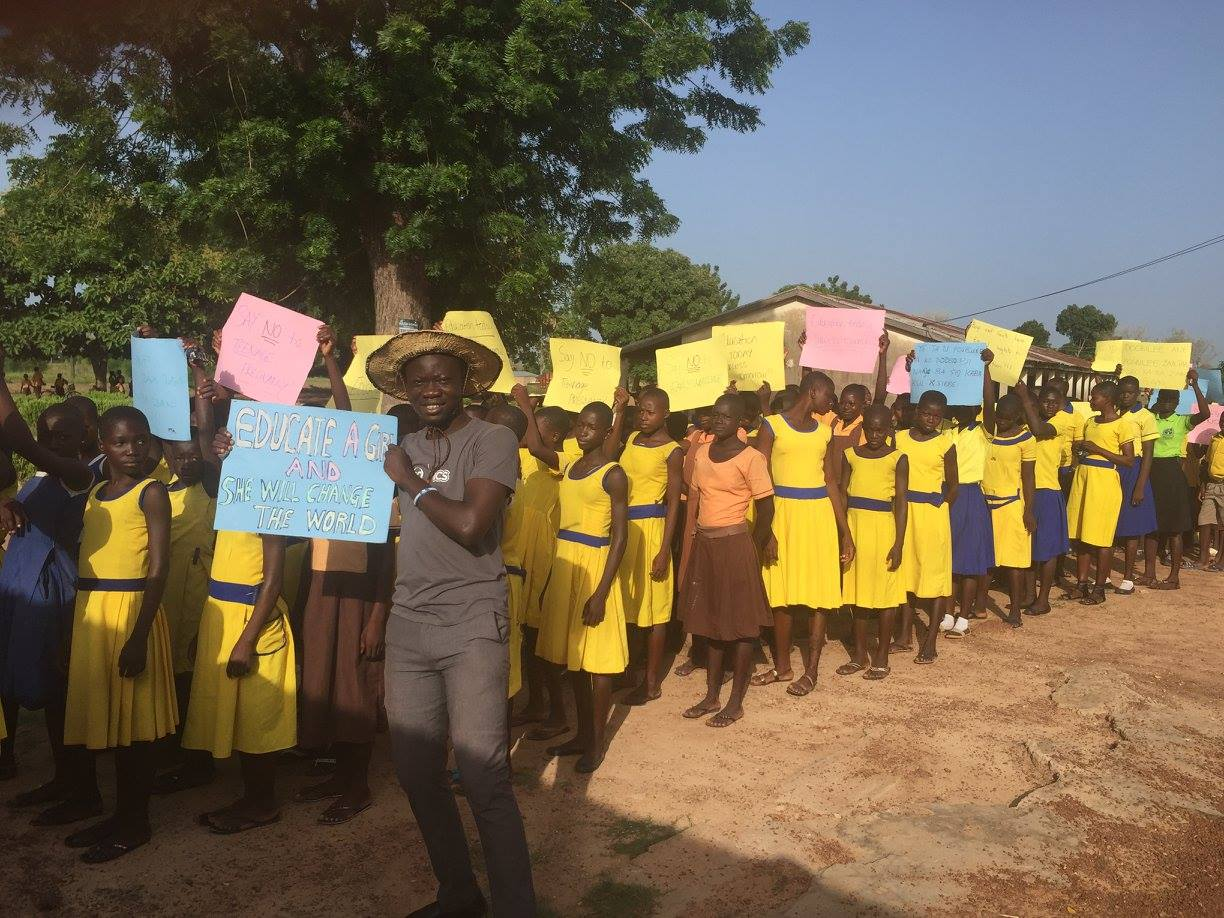
Students in Ghana in a parade for inclusive education

== Gender inequality ==
Ghana has made considerable progress in gender equality since the 1970s. The Gender Parity Index (GPI) has risen from 0.76 (1971) to 1.00 (2019), suggesting gender equality for primary and secondary school levels. GPI for tertiary school enrollment experienced the most growth, from 0.17 (1971) to 0.85 (2019).

=== Barriers to attendance ===
Some of the factors preventing girls from obtaining education include gender-based violence, lack of access to feminine hygiene products, and teenage pregnancy. In Ghanaian schools, 52% of girls have experienced gender-based violence, discouraging them from attending school. Feminine hygiene products, such as pads and tampons, are classified as "luxurious items" as opposed to essentials, causing a 20% import tax levy. According to a UNESCO report, 1 in 10 girls in Africa miss school when they are on their period. Adolescent pregnancy is another limiting factor to girls' access to education. In 2013, 14% of adolescent girls aged 15–19 years old had begun child bearing, with 11% giving birth to a live child, significantly hindering their education and academic performance.

The level of enrollment in college still shows gender-based differences. In 2017, 18.68% of boys were enrolled in tertiary education, compared to only 13.53% of girls.

=== Performance ===
According to a study in the Upper East Region of Ghana, boys perform better than girls in mathematics largely because maths and sciences are still seen as male domains. Learning outcomes have been an area of concern, with wide variations in Basic Education Certificate Examination (BECE) results across regions and by gender: the three northern regions perform particularly poorly, and especially compared to Greater Accra, and these effects are exacerbated when looking at gender disparities by region, where results are skewed against girls in all four core subjects (English, mathematics, science, and social studies).

=== Improvements ===
Various initiatives have been created by the Ghanaian government to promote girls' education. The Girls' Education Unit was created under the Ghana Education Service in 1997 to improve access to quality education for girls. Girls' Education Officers are stationed across all the 170 districts in the country to support its effort on a local level. In its 2018-2030 Education Strategic Plan, gender equality remains a central topic.

Innovative solutions have been adopted, such as establishing girls-only schools. In 2008, Oxfam partnered with the Ghana Education Service, and started the first girls-only junior high school in Sawla where 28 girls coming from disadvantaged family backgrounds were enrolled. There are now 44 girls-only schools in northern Ghana, bettering career prospects for more than 1,642 Ghanaian girls, out of which 95 percent graduated, with the majority continuing on to higher education.

== Wealth inequality ==
The Free and Compulsory Universal Basic Education (FCUBE) program introduced in 1995 guaranteed free universal education. However, household income still strongly correlates with a child's enrollment.

=== Indirect and Opportunity Costs Discourage Enrollment ===
Despite tuition being free, there are other forms of costs associated with schooling that burdens the poorest households. Some of these are levied by schools, such as registration fees and costs associated with uniforms and lunches. Outside of school, transport costs also contribute to non-attendance, especially for children from remote, rural areas.

Additionally, opportunity costs also contribute to non-attendance, as 35% of parents indicate their children stopped attending school because they cannot afford school and/or their children need to work at home (e.g. farming).

Consequently, a child from the poorest quintile of Ghanaian population is on average 3 years over grade-relevant age. This impact accumulates incrementally at each higher grade. 67% of college students are from the top quintile, while only 1.8% are from the bottom quintile.

=== Quality of Education ===
The quality of education also varies based on wealth. Trained primary school teachers are twice as scarce in the poorest districts than elsewhere. Outside classrooms, 48% of households indicated that they pay additional fees for private tutoring.

=== Improvements ===
The Ministry of Education has made "improved equitable access to and participation in quality basic education" a priority in its 2018-2030 Education Strategic Plan. For example, the Complementary Basic Education program provides education to thousands of out-of-school children to assist in their transition into mainstream education. Specifically addressing the challenges posed by indirect costs, the School Feeding Program, administered by the Ministry of Gender, Children and Social Protection, has provided free nutritious meals to 1.74 million children, increasing school attendance.

== Regional inequality ==
According to a UNESCO survey, while about 7 percent of parents point to geographic factors associated with school distance, nearly all parents who indicate cost as the main hurdle of attendance reside in remote and difficult-to-reach areas, underscoring geography as a principal determinant.

=== Intersectionality with wealth and gender inequalities ===
Region based education inequality stems in part from region based poverty. For example, the Northern region in Ghana is the poorest, and also the most educationally deprived, with 61.6% of its population having received less than four years of education.

Gender inequality is also more stark when interplaying with other factors such as geography. For example, the average years of education for rural and poorest girls is 4.4 years, compared to the 13 years for the richer urban girls and 13.2 years for the richer urban boys.

=== Improvements ===
An example of non-governmental effort to reach the youths in marginalized rural communities, School For Life has helped over 350,000 children to read and write, 80% of which have transitioned into formal education. It boosts attendance through by accommodating seasonal labor demands in the school calendar and recruiting local teachers who teach in local languages.

== See also ==
- Educational inequality
- Education in Ghana
