= Nana Otuo Siriboe II =

Ghanaian engineer and paramount chief

Personal details
- Born: Ghana
- Education: Kwame Nkrumah University of Science and Technology
- Occupation: Entrepreneur
- Profession: Electrical engineer
- Portfolio: Chair, Council of State

Nana Otuo Siriboe II is a Ghanaian traditional ruler, electrical engineer and entrepreneur. He is the Paramount Chief of the Juaben Traditional Area. He has served in several capacities in chieftaincy affairs and held many Government of Ghana appointments. He held the position of Chairman of the 7th and 8th Council of State of the Fourth Republic.

== Early life and education ==
Nana Otuo Siriboe II was born in the Ashanti Region of Ghana. He attended Opoku Ware School in Kumasi. He was admitted to study electrical engineering at the Kwame Nkrumah University of Science and Technology in the 1960s. He graduated in 1969 and after a brief stint as an engineer, he was enstooled as the Paramount Chief of the Juaben Traditional Area.

== Enstoolment and Rule ==
Nana Otuo Siriboe II was installed as Paramount Chief of Juaben Traditional Area in 1971. He holds the official title of Juabenhene – Chief of Juaben. While serving as a traditional ruler, he has acquired vast experience in the fields of business, governance and chieftaincy affairs in the ensuing years after his enstoolment. Nana Siriboe II performs several assignments with and for the Asantehene and the Asante Kingdom. In February, 2017, he accompanied the Asantehene, Osei Tutu II, to Seychelles, where they met the President of Seychelles, James Michel.

== Council of State ==
During the John Agyekum Kufour administration, Nana Otuo Siriboe II was appointed to the Council of State. He served two terms as a member of the Council from 2001 to 2009. In February 2017, he was again appointed to the Council by President Nana Akufo-Addo.

During the swearing-in ceremony held at The Flagstaff House, President Akufo-Addo entreated the Council to advise him well with the view to always propel Ghana to greater heights. He was unanimously elected to chair all the activities of the 25-member Council.

During the handing-over ceremony of the 6th session of the Council to the 7th, the Outgoing Council Chair, Naa Prof. John S. Nabila, advised the new house to give their best counsel to the new government to ensure that the country and all its citizens would live in prosperity and peace. Nana Otuo Siriboe's responsibilities as the Chair of the Council include meeting with Ghanaians of all political persuasions and professionals to listen to their concerns and views so an unbiased conclusion can be attained during the Council's deliberations. He regularly makes public statements which are seen to shape both government and private industry policies.

Six months after becoming Chair of the Council of State, Nana Otuo Siriboe II, in an address enumerated some of the work the Council had done. They included 36 meetings to discuss important issues concerning the country. Chief among the issues, according to him, were those that concerned the creation of new regions in the country.

On 23 February 2021, he was again re-elected and sworn in as the Chairman of the 8th Council of State by His Excellency, the President, Nana Akufo-Addo.

== Positions Held ==
Throughout his life as an electrical engineer and traditional ruler, Nana Siriboe II has held several positions in public life. The time frame for this has been over 46 years and they include:

- Member of Constituent Assembly of 1979
- Member of Ghana Broadcasting Corporation Board
- Komfo Anokye Teaching Hospital Board
- St. Louis Secondary School Board
- Chairman of the KNUST Council
- Member of Lands Commission
- Member of Ghana Prison Service Council
- Ghana Trade Fair Authority
- Director of AngloGold Ashanti
- Member of the Council of State
- Chairman of the Council of State
