= Educate Ghana =

Part of the NABCO initiative in Ghana focused on the education sector

Educate Ghana is a module of NABCO which is an initiative set up by the government of Ghana to address the graduate unemployment in the country. The module is targeted at the education sector, so that various trainees would be deployed into various schools or various educational establishment.
