= Gabriel Tanko Kwamigah-Atokple =

Council of State (Ghana) Member

His Excellency Gabriel Tanko Kwamigah-Atokple
- Born: November 28, 1987 (age 38); Weta
- Education: University of Ghana (BA)
- Occupations: Entrepreneur, politician, public servant
- Known for: Member of Council of State representing Volta Region, TK Realties, Sesi-Edem Gold LLC
- Political party: National Democratic Congress (Ghana)
- Partner: Patricia Selasi Awoonor
- Children: 4

Gabriel Tanko Kwamigah-Atokple also known by his traditional title as Togbui Nyaxorladeakorla I (born November 28, 1987) is a Ghanaian businessman, public servant, politician, farmer, and philanthropist who serves as the Volta Region's representative on the Council of State since February 2025.

== Early life and education ==
Kwamigah-Atokple was born in Weta, a town in Ketu North Municipality of the Volta Region. He is of Ewe ethnicity.

He completed his secondary education at Presbyterian Boys' Secondary School, Legon, in 2008. In 2013, Tanko earned a Bachelor of Arts degree in Sociology with History from the University of Ghana, Legon. He furthered his education by obtaining an International Executive MBA in Project Management from the Paris Graduate School of Management and an International Certificate in Public-Private Partnership from CITED in Kenya. He also has professional exposure and training experiences in the United States.

== Political career ==
Kwamigah-Atokple is a member of the National Democratic Congress (NDC). He served on the party's National Welfare Committee as well as other regional committees.

He unsuccessfully contested the NDC parliamentary primaries in Ketu North constituency in 2019 and 2023.

== Council of State ==
In February 2025, at age 37, Kwamigah-Atokple was elected as the Volta Region's representative on Ghana's Council of State. His election marked a generational shift in the region's leadership and restored Weta's representation in national governance, following in the footsteps of Professor Kofi Nyidevu Awoonor, who previously served as Council of State Chairman from 2009 to 2013.

== Philanthropy ==
In 2020, Kwamigah-Atokple founded the Tanko Foundation, an independent non-profit organization dedicated to creating positive social change and empowering communities across Ghana.

== Personal life ==
Kwamigah-Atokple is married to Patricia Selasie Awoonor. They have four children.
