= Paa Kofi Ansong =

Ghanaian biochemist and businessman

- President: Nana Akuffo-Addo

Personal details
- Born: Ghana
- Party: New Patriotic Party

Paa Kofi Ansong is a Ghanaian biochemist, entrepreneur and businessman. He is the co-founder and chairman of venture capital group Investrade International. He serves on several Ghanaian boards including the director of Adehyeman Savings and Loans Company Ltd. He was appointed to the Council of State in February 2017.

== Education and working life ==
Paa Kofi Ansong attended the University of Ghana and graduated with a Bachelor of Science degree in biochemistry. After graduating from university, he traveled outside Ghana and initially worked as a Quality Control Officer with Boots Pharmacy in the United Kingdom. Upon his return to Ghana, he co-founded a venture capital firm, Investrade International Company Limited, with his friend Kwadwo Amoafo in August 1993. He now serves as the chairman of the firm. Due to his experience in private finance and management, he serves on many company boards across the country. They include Adehyeman Savings and Loans Company Ltd, St. Roses Secondary School in Akwatia, Ghana National Procurement Agency and Abossey Okai Spare Parts Association.

== Council of State ==
In February 2017 he was appointed to the council by President Nana Akuffo-Addo. During the swearing-in ceremony held at The Flagstaff House, President Akuffo-Addo entreated the council to advise him well with the view to always propel Ghana to greater heights. During the handing over ceremony of the sixth session of the council to the seventh, the outgoing council chair, Naa Prof. John S. Nabila, advised the new house to give their best counsel to the new government to ensure that the country and all its citizens would live in prosperity and peace.
