= Takoradi International School =

School in Ghana

Information
- Former name: Takoradi Learning Centre
- School type: International school
- Established: 1998; 28 years ago
- Years: Nursery - Year 11
- Age: 3 to 16
- Language: English

Takoradi International School is an international school in Takoradi in the Western Region of Ghana.

== History and structure ==
It was opened in 1998 as the Takoradi Learning Centre.

It aimed at providing a high standards of international education, following a British educational-oriented programme . The school has since grown, changed its name to Takoradi International School and is now providing education from kindergarten to senior secondary.

The school is divided into three sections: kindergarten (equivalent nursery and reception), primary (key stages 1 and 2), and secondary – years 10–11 (key stage 3).

== Curriculum ==
Teaching is done in accordance with the British National Curriculum and employs the English language as the medium of instruction. Pupils sit the following statutory examinations, which have a closer association with the International General Certificate of Secondary Education (IGCSE).

- Key stage 1 – end of year 2
- Key stage 2 – end of year 6
- Checkpoint – end of year 9

Pupils in year 10 and 11 study for the IGCSE at the end of year 11.

== Academic programme ==
=== Upper primary school ===
Pupils in the years 3 to 6 are presented with a wide range of subjects. English language, mathematics, science, geography and history are taught in accordance with the British National Strategy. Art & design, design & technology, music, French, ICT, dance and physical education are taught individually by specialized teachers.

Pupils also begin to study French in year 4. In addition to these more academic subjects, pupils continue to engage in physical education, swimming, dance, art and music on a weekly basis. At the end of year 6, pupils will study for the Key Stage 2 British Statutory Tests.

=== Secondary school ===
The secondary school offers a five-year programme leading to the IGCSE final examinations of Cambridge International Examinations (CIE). The school is a fully registered CIE centre attached to the British Council, Ghana. Students are prepared to sit the Cambridge Checkpoint Exams in year 9 (end of key stage 3) in English language, mathematics and science.

Subjects in the secondary department are taught by specialist teachers who hold degrees in their specific subjects in addition to a teaching qualification.

The academic subjects taught as part of the IGCSE examinations are:

- Biology
- Chemistry
- English language
- English literature
- French as an additional language
- Geography
- History
- Information and communication technology (ICT)
- Mathematics
  - Additional mathematics
- Physics

Art & design, music, design & technology, physical education and swimming remain weekly fixtures on the timetable.

== Facilities and teaching staff ==
The school has air-conditioned classrooms, fully equipped computer laboratory, separate art and science rooms.

Teaching staff hold teaching degrees and specialized teachers in primary and secondary school hold degrees in their subjects. The school has the use of a large swimming pool where children learn how to swim.

== See also ==
- Education in Ghana
- List of international schools
- List of senior high schools in Ghana
