= Torgbe Adja Tekpor VI =

Torgbe Adja Tekpor VI was a traditional ruler in Ghana and Paramount Chief of Osie Avatime in the Volta Region. He was the fifth president of the National House of Chiefs and served from 1989 – 1992.
