= SOS-Hermann Gmeiner International College =

Co-educational international school in Tema, Ghana

SOS International College

Location
- Tema; Ghana; 5.6585°N 0.0113°W

Information
- Type: Independent, Co-educational, International Boarding School
- Established: 1990
- Founder: SOS Children's Villages
- Head teacher: Eliz Dadson (Principal)
- Grades: Middle Years Programme (MYP) & Diploma Programme (DP)
- Enrolment: Approx. 330–360
- Campus: Academic Campus and Residential Campus (Hostels)
- Colors: Royal Navy Blue, White
- Slogan: Knowledge in the Service of Africa
- Nickname: SOSIC
- Graduates: 2300+
- Alumni name: SICAN - SOS International College Alumni Network
- Website: www.sosic.edu.gh

SOS International College (SOSIC) formerly SOS-Hermann Gmeiner International College (SOS-HGIC) is a selective co-educational international boarding school located in Tema, Ghana. Established in 1990 as a project of SOS Children's Villages, the college educates academically gifted youth from across Africa alongside international and Ghanaian students.

== History and Ethos ==
The college was established in 1990 by SOS Children's Villages International to provide preparatory and tertiary-bound educational opportunities for academically promising students raised in SOS Children's Villages across Africa. These include students from countries such as Zimbabwe, Zambia, Kenya, Tanzania, Rwanda, Burundi, Uganda, Eswatini, Lesotho, Nigeria, and Sierra Leone.

The institution operates under the motto "Knowledge in the Service of Africa" and grounds its educational philosophy in five core values abbreviated as SPIRE: Service, Pan-Africanism, Integrity, Respect, and Excellence.

== Leadership ==
The college has been guided by four principals since its establishment:

=== Timeline of Principals ===
Name	Term of Office	Key Milestones & Notes
Dr. Albrecht Feurstein	1990–1992	Founding principal; oversaw initial institutional setup and early expansion of the Tema campus.
Mrs. Margaret Nkrumah	1992–2012	Served 20 years; widely credited with embedding the college's Pan-African ethos, academic standing, and IB accreditation.
Mr. Israel Titi-Ofei	2012–2020	Oversaw academic expansion and initial developments leading to full IB continuum status.
Mrs. Eliz Dadson	2020–present	Appointed in 2020; led the authorization and adoption of the IB Middle Years Programme (MYP).

== Academics and Curriculum ==
SOSIC is an authorized International Baccalaureate (IB) World School offering the IB continuum for middle and secondary education:

- Middle Years Programme (MYP): Authorized on 8 October 2020, covering lower secondary levels.
- Diploma Programme (DP): Authorized on 12 March 1993, making it one of the earliest IB Diploma centers in West Africa.

Admission is competitive and based on entrance examinations, academic records, and personal interviews. Approximately 40% of the student body enters from SOS Children's Villages, while 60% comprises fee-paying students from Ghana and international locations.

=== Geospatial Technology Integration ===
In collaboration with Esri and local distributor Sambus Company Limited, the college integrated Geographic Information Systems (GIS) and spatial analysis into its IGCSE and IB curricula. The program equips students with spatial thinking skills, database analysis capabilities, and environmental modeling tools such as equatorial solar radiation analysis.

== Campus and Facilities ==
The institution operates across two distinct campus sites in Tema:

- Academic Campus: Located in Community 6 (near the Valco flats), featuring science and computer laboratories, a Makerspace and Creativity Lab, visual art studios, music/theatre spaces, a central library (Valco Library), administrative offices, an auditorium, and social spaces.
- Residential Campus (Hostels): Located in Community 10, housing residential accommodations divided into student houses (including Vikings, Titans, Spartans, and Trojans), dining halls, a soccer pitch, tennis courts, a basketball court, an athletic oval, a gymnasium, and an outdoor swimming pool.

== Student Activities and Community Impact ==
Student life emphasizes community service (Creativity, Activity, Service / CAS), athletics, and intellectual competitions.

- Fundraising and Service Projects: First-year IB students annually organize campus fundraisers, such as the long-running "Elektra Funfair" (supported by corporate sponsors like Somovision) and student initiatives, to raise funds for community water, sanitation, literacy, and digital divide projects in underserved communities.
- The READ Project: In 2025, a student team led "The READ Project," raising over GH₵ 60,000 to renovate and fully stock a modern library for Anyako Senior High School in the Volta Region.
- Competitions and Events: Annual events include the Kutin Cup, Interhostel Swimming Competitions, National Day celebrations, and the Orator of the Year public speaking contest.
- Commencement Ceremonies: The college hosts prominent public figures and intellectuals for its annual commencement address. In June 2026, lawyer Ace Anan Ankomah delivered the keynote address to the graduating class on ethical leadership in an era dominated by artificial intelligence.

== Global Educational Partnerships ==
The college maintains global partnerships to enhance international mindedness among students:

- News Decoder Partnership: Joined in August 2021, the program enables students to participate in global webinars and contribute articles on global issues. In 2022, SOSIC student Maame Afua Kome-Mensah was recognized in News Decoder's 12th Storytelling Contest for her essay on youth self-realization and global citizenship.
- School Exchanges: Maintains international student exchange initiatives with IB World Schools globally, including Cologne International School in Germany.

== Affiliations and Memberships ==
SOS International College is accredited by and affiliated with several international educational bodies:

- International Baccalaureate (IB): Authorized IB World School offering both the Diploma Programme (DP) and Middle Years Programme (MYP).
- Association of International Schools in Africa (AISA): Member institution participating in regional professional development and governance networks across Africa.
- SOS Children's Villages International: Founded as an educational institution under the global parent organization.

== Notable Alumni and Leadership ==
- Justice Klorkor Okai Mills – High Court Judge in Accra, Ghana.
- Akofa Kuenyehia Bentsi-Enchill – Co-Founder and Executive Director of the Akua Kuenyehia Foundation.
