= Poure Puobe VII =

Traditional ruler in Ghana (1945–2019)

Poure Puobe VII (13 October 1945 – 2019) was a traditional ruler in Ghana and Paramount Chief of Nandom in the Upper East Region. He was the eighth president of the National House of Chiefs and served in an acting capacity in 1999.
