= Kwamankese =

Town in the Central Region of Ghana

Kwamankese is a town in the Central Region of Ghana. The town is located in the Abura-Asebu-Kwamankese municipality.
