= Odeefuo Boaponsem =

Odeefuo Boaponsem was a traditional ruler in Ghana and Paramount Chief of Denkyira in the Central Region. His official title was Denkyirahene - King of Denkyira. He was the ninth president of the National House of Chiefs and served from 1999 to 2001.
