= Emma Mitchell (politician) =

Ghanaian politician

Minister for Trade and Industry
- President: Jerry Rawlings
- Preceded by: John Bawa
- Succeeded by: John Frank Abu

Member, Council of State of Ghana
- In office 2001 – January 2005
- President: John Kufuor

Personal details
- Party: National Democratic Congress

Emma Mitchell is a Ghanaian politician and an advocate on gender issues. She was the Minister for Trade and Industry of Ghana between 1993 and 1996. She described Rawlings as someone whose administration style was built on consensus rather than authoritariansim.

== Minister for Trade and Industry ==
Mitchell resigned from the Rawlings government in February 1996. She reported that this was over a disagreement with the President, Jerry Rawlings. She reported that after she left government and the facts of the disagreement had been established, Rawlings invited her back into government but she opted to stay out.

== Council of state ==
In 2001, Mitchell was appointed to the Council of State by John Kufuor, President of Ghana along with 11 others. She served on the council between 2001 and January 2005.

== Notes and references ==
Political offices
Preceded by John Bawa	Minister for Trade and Industry; 1993 – 2000	Succeeded by John Frank Abu
