= Osabarimba Kwesi Atta II =

Ghanaian ruler

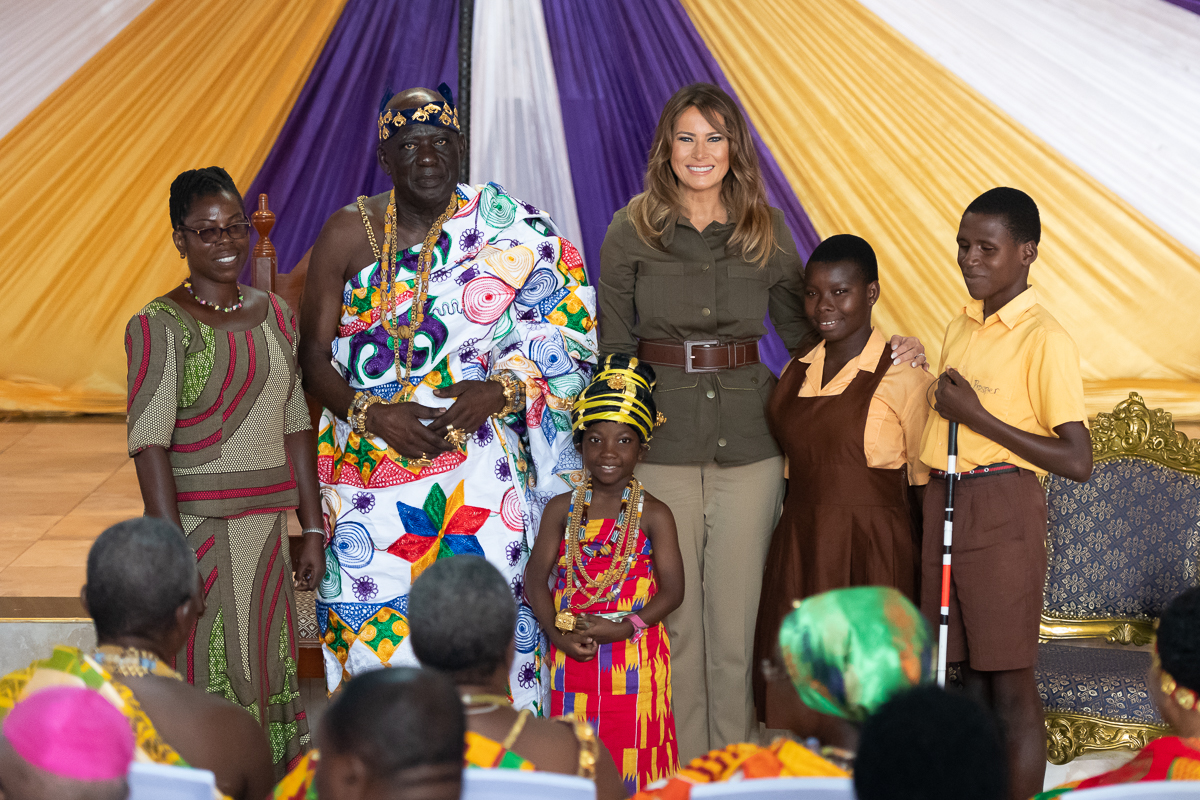
Osabarimba Kwesi Atta II with US First Lady Melania Trump in October 2018

Osabarimba Kwesi Atta II is a Ghanaian traditional ruler and the Omanhene of the Oguaa traditional area. He has served on many Government of Ghana agencies as board member.
