= National House of Chiefs =

Assembly of chiefs in Ghana

The National House of Chiefs is the highest body in Ghana that unites all traditional rulers, chiefs and kings. The institution has backing from the Constitution of Ghana.

== Membership ==
The various rulers of Ghana's numerous tribes and clans automatically become members of a number of regional houses of chiefs. It is their membership of these regional bodies that qualifies them for membership of the national house.

In addition to these chiefs, a number of queen mothers are also appointed to the national house as associate members. These titleholders are appointed for four-year terms, and are eligible for re-appointment thereafter.

Although the national and regional houses are dominated by citizens of Ghana, they are affiliated with a number of foreign nationals. The African-American religious leader Ra Un Nefer Amen, for example, serves as the U.S. representative of the chiefs in congress assembled. He himself holds a Ghanaian chieftaincy in his own right.

== Presidents of NHC with their vice president ==
Since the creation of the National House of Chiefs, a president and his vice-president have been selected from among the members of the house to direct their affairs. The practice first started in 1969.

	President	Title	Year
1	Otumfour Agyemang Prempeh II	Asantehene	1969 – 1970
2	Otumfour Opoku Ware II	Asantehene	1970 – 1978
3	Osagyefo Agyemang Badu I	Dormaahene	1978 – 1982
4	Otumfour Opoku Ware II	Asantehene	1982 – 1989
5	Torgbe Adja Tekpor VI	Osie Avatime	1989 – 1992
6	Nana Oduro Nimapau II	Esumejahene	1992 – 1998
7	Osagyefo Kuntunkunuku II	Okyenhene	1998 – 1999
8	Dr. Poure Puobe VII	Nandom	1999
9	Odeefuo Boaponsem	Denkyirahene	1999 – 2001
10	Odeneho Gyapong Ababio II	Sefwi-Bekwaihene	2001 – 2008
11	Prof. Naa John S. Nabila	Wulugu Naba	2008 – 2016
12	Togbe Afede XIV	Agbogbomefia	2016 –2020
13	Ogyeahoho Yaw Gyebi II	Sefwi Anhwiasohene	2020-present

== See also ==
- Chieftaincy institution (Ghana)
