= Nana Oduro Nimapau II =

Ghanaian traditional ruler

Nana Oduro Nimapau II (c.1925 – 22 August 2003) was a traditional ruler in Ghana and Paramount Chief of Esumeja. His official title was Esumejahene - Chief of Esumeja. He was the sixth president of the National House of Chiefs and served from 1992 to 1998. He also served as president of Ghana Musicians Union in the 1960s.

Nana Oduro Nimapau died on 22 August 2003 at the age of 78.
