= Ogyeahohoo Yaw Gyebi II =

Ogyeahohoo Yaw Gyebi

President of the National House of Chiefs
- Incumbent
- Assumed office 12 November 2020

President of the Western Regional House of Chiefs
- Incumbent
- Assumed office November 2016

Personal details
- Born: 1950 (age 75–76) Western Region, Ghana

Ogyeahohoo Yaw Gyebi is a Ghanaian traditional ruler and Paramount Chief of Sefwi Anhwiaso traditional area. He is currently the president of Western Region House of Chiefs. He became the president of the National House of Chiefs on November 12, 2020.

== Early and working life ==
Yaw Gyebi was born in 1950 in the Western Region of Ghana. He attended several schools in Ghana and read courses in business. He is an accountant by profession.

== Paramount Chief ==
Yaw Gyebi was made the Paramount Chief of the Sefwi Anhwiaso Traditional Area. His area of rule covers a territory from the upper eastern part of the western region.

== President of House of Chiefs ==
In November 2016, officials of the Electoral Commission of Ghana organized an election to fill the position of President of the Western Region House of Chiefs. Yaw Gyebi contested and won by obtaining seven votes out of a total vote count of eleven. His contender for the seat was Nana Kwesi Agyemang IX, the paramount chief of Lower Dixcove Traditional Area, who had been the acting president of the House prior the election. Yaw Gyebi was sworn into office by Justice Peter Kwodwo Ababio, a Sekondi-Takoradi High Court Judge.

As the elected head of all chiefs in the Western Region, Ogyeahohoo Yaw Gyebi II, represents the region at the National House of Chiefs. He serves as the chief mediator for the settling of disputes among traditional rulers in the region. He has also been soliciting for funds and donations for the improvement of educational institutions. As part of his duties, he also receives dignitaries and government officials who pay visits to the region. On 12 November 2020, he was elected as the President of the National House of Chiefs by beating Togbe Afede by 59 votes to 25.

== Appointments ==
In May 2017, President Nana Akufo-Addo appointed Yaw Gyebi and John S. Nabila, a former President of the National House of Chiefs, to the board of the Ghana National Petroleum Corporation. The board is made up of seven members and has the responsibility of managing Ghana's oil resources.
