= Daasebre Oti Boateng =

Ghanaian statistician, academic, and traditional ruler (1938–2021)

Omanhene of New Juaben
- In office 1992–2021
- Preceded by: Nana Kwaku Boateng II

Personal details
- Born: Emmanuel Oti Boateng; 1938 Gold Coast
- Died: August 2021 (aged 82–83)

Daasebre Oti Boateng (1938 – August 2021) was a Ghanaian statistician, academic, and traditional ruler. He was the Omanhene (paramount chief) of New Juaben in the Eastern Region from 1992 until his death in 2021. He served as president of the Eastern Region House of Chiefs.

== Early life and education ==
He attended Konongo Odumasi Senior High School for his secondary school education. Oti Boateng proceeded to the University of Ghana where he completed with a Bachelor of Science (BSc) degree in Economics. He furthered his education at London School of Economics and Political Science where he earned a Master of Science (MSc) degree in Statistics. Oti Boateng also held Doctor of Philosophy (PhD) degree in Statistics from the University of Liverpool, United Kingdom.

== Career ==
Oti Boateng served as the Ghanaian Government statistician and head of the Statistical Service from 1982 to 2000 aggregating to a total of 17 years as head of statistical service. Daasebre also worked with the University of Ghana for 14 years. Within the 14 years he rose to the position of Senior Research Fellow and subsequently Director of Studies at the Institute of Statistical, Social and Economic Research (ISSER). Oti Boateng was elected as the first black Chairman of the United Nations Statistical Commission In 1987. In 1993, he also served as the Chairman of the 15th International Conference of Labor Statisticians which was held in Geneva.

He was a member of the International Civil Service Commission (ICSC) and he served also as Commissioner on the commission at the UN Headquarters in New York.

He was the Chancellor for the All Nations University, a private university in the Eastern Region.

== Reign ==
He ascended the New Juaben stool under the stool name Daasebre Oti Boateng in 1992, succeeding his elder brother and predecessor, the late Nana Kwaku Boateng II. He was a member of the Yiadom-Hwedie royal family of Juaben, Ashanti, and New Juaben. His mother was the queenmother of Juaben.

== Author ==
Oti Boateng authored several books and research papers regarding local governance, statistics and community, national development. In 2019 he launched a 3 volume book with the title 'Development in Unity' in Accra

== Personal life ==
He was a member of the freemasonry community under the Grand Lodge of Ghana.
