= Odeneho Gyapong Ababio II =

Ghanaian traditional ruler and chief

Odeneho Gyapong Ababio II was a traditional ruler in Ghana and Paramount Chief of Sefwi-Bekwai in the Western North Region. His official title was Sefwi-Bekwai Omanhene - King of Sefwi-Bekwai. He was the tenth president of the National House of Chiefs and served from 2001 to 2008.

He attended the Ghana Secondary Technical School(Takoradi).
