= Nation Builders Corps =

Government initiative in Ghana

The Nation Builders Corps, also known as N.A.B.C.O, is a Ghanaian initiative to provide jobs to unemployed post-secondary school graduates (graduates of universities, training colleges, etc.) It was introduced by the government of Ghana.

The initiative aims to solve various social problems in both private and public sectors, and to build worker skills to promote economic growth. Trainees of this flagship program are given monthly stipends

== History ==
In August 2019, as a result of the closure of several non-performing banks by the Bank of Ghana, trainees whose stipends were paid onto GN Bank's Ezwich cards did not receive their stipends. Trainees had not been paid nine months on. Although NABCO has kept many unemployed graduates in temporary employment, monthly stipends have become an issue for trainees, some of whom still have arrears to be paid to them.

== NABCO cloth ==
The NABCO program provides graduate trainees with African cloth so that they can show that they are part of the program or create some kind of awareness when they go to work. The cloth is supposed to be worn on Mondays and Fridays only. However, the cloth was never distributed to NABCO Trainees. The various District Coordinators compulsorily tasked trainees to pay amounts ranging from GHs 30 and 35 as fees for the supposed clothes to be sewn for them. Trainees who resisted had their timesheets not signed by their coordinator.

== Graduation ==
On the 17 October 2018 trainees were invited to a graduation ceremony. On the day of the ceremony, graduates from across the country trooped to the Independence or Black Star Square. Most trainees from other regions were represented by a few, but those from Greater Accra all attended the event.

The president, vice president, and ministers of state attended the ceremony, receiving a rousing welcome from the trainees. The event commenced with Christian and Muslim prayers. The master of ceremonies was the Minister-Designate Kojo Oppong Nkrumah. Trainees were selected or volunteered matched to modules without any training. Representatives from various modules provided statistics on the number of people recruited and training costs associated.

The president's speech provided additional statistics about the initiative and how this initiative would encourage the Ghanaian youth to make a difference in the future. He commended his team for the work they did to bring this initiative to fruition.
