= John S. Nabila =

Ghanaian geographer and academic (died 2025)

Wulugu Naba John Sebiyam Nabila PhD
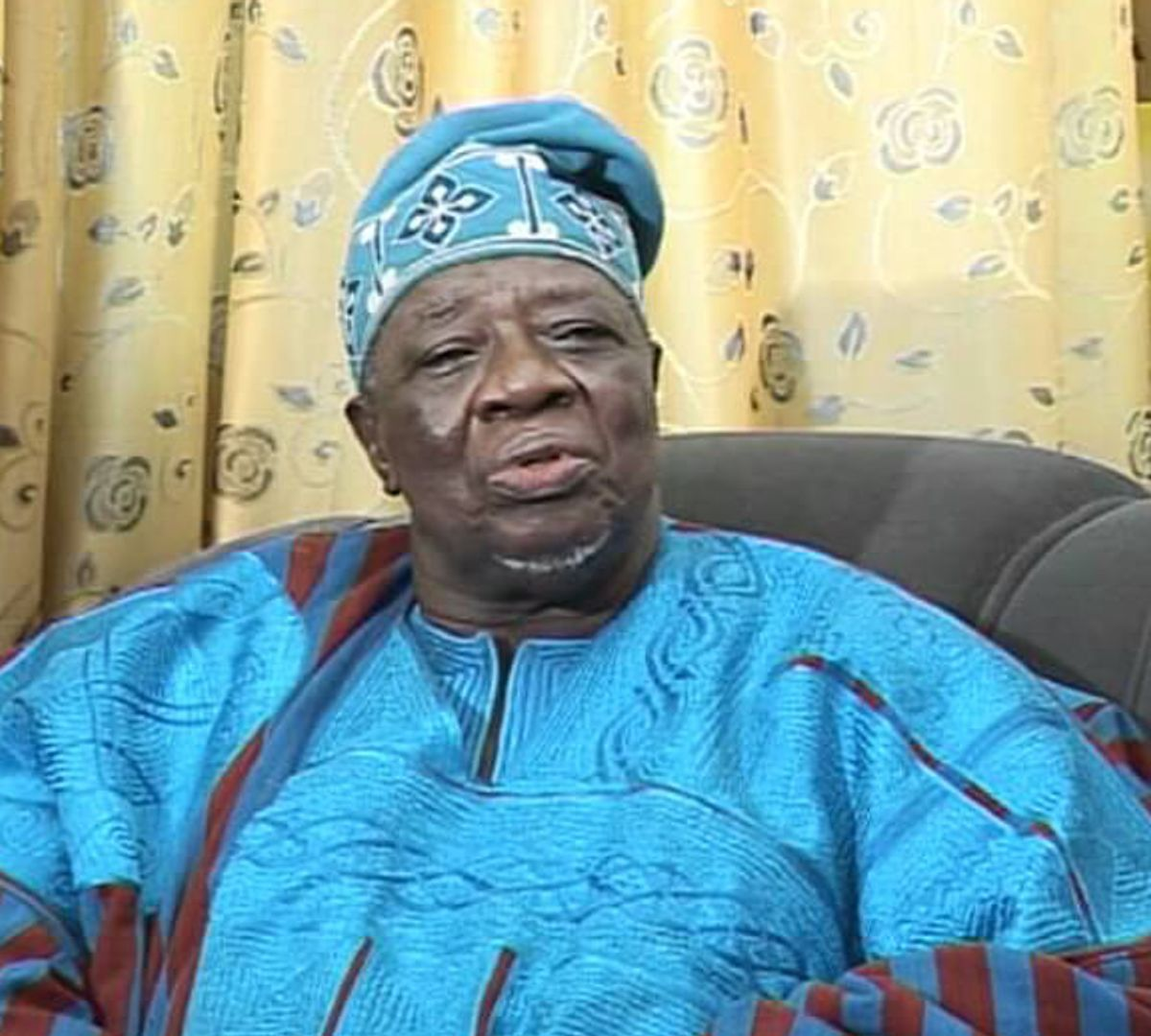

President National House of Chiefs
- In office 2008–2016
- President: John Kufour, John Mahama
- Succeeded by: Togbe Afede XIV

Minister for Information and Tourism
- In office 1980–1981
- Preceded by: Yaw O. Afriyie
- Succeeded by: Joyce Aryee

Personal details
- Born: Ghana
- Died: October 2025 Accra, Ghana
- Education: University of Ghana
- Occupation: Paramount Chief
- Profession: Development planner
- Committees: Board member, GNPC

John Sebiyam Nabila (died October 2025) was a Ghanaian politician, geographer, philanthropist and academic. He was Chief of the Kpasenkpe traditional area (Wulugu, Nameyela, Sariba, Nabari, Duu, Arigu, Dibsi Arba, etc.) in the North East Region of Ghana. He served as the president of the National House of Chiefs from 2008 to 2016. He was a member of the Ghana National Petroleum Corporation board. He was the Minister for Information and Tourism in the Limann government.

== Early and working life ==
John Nabila hailed from the Kpasenkpe in the North East Region of Ghana. He started his school at Kpasenkpe L/A school and later in his life, he went to Accra to further his education.

Nabila was employed at the Geography and Resource Development, University of Ghana, Legon, as a lecturer. He rose to the rank of Associate professor and Head of Department. He also served as Head of the Population Impact Project, in the University of Ghana. As he had worked on several geography related issues in Ghana, he was seen as an advocate and philanthropist for improved family life policies. He helped the people of Kpasenkpe to have potable water, fixing of spoilt boreholes, buying and fixing of health equipment and helping the community to improve on education by keeping the bungalows in shape and help improve the lives of all.

== Chief Of Wulugu Traditional Area ==
John Nabila was enskinned as Wulugu Naba - Paramount chief of the Wulugu Traditional Area. The traditional area Wulugu, is within the West Mamprusi municipality in the North East Region, Ghana. As paramount chief, he sought the well-being of his people by promoting activities that encourage the improvement of the livelihood of his people.

== President of House of Chiefs ==
In 2008 he contested the presidency of the National House of Chiefs. He won by obtaining 34 out of 47 valid votes cast. His contender was Daasebre Professor Oti Boateng, paramount chief of the New-Juaben Traditional Area, who had 13 votes. He stood unopposed during the 2012 house elections. As president of the house, he played several roles in advocating for improved health conditions for medical personnel and patients. He used all avenues to preach peace to Ghanaians especially during national elections. During his time as president, he authored the "National House of Chiefs’ Code of Royal Ethics for Chiefs", which is a reference material for the conduct of members of the House. He also used his position to intervene and finding solutions to national disputes including helping to resolve a 2015 impasse between striking medical Doctors and the Government of Ghana over conditions of service. His term as president of the house ended in 2016. He handed over to Togbe Afede XIV, the Agbogbomefia of the Asogli State.

== Death ==
Nabila died, after a short illness, in Accra, which was announced on 27 October 2025.

== Positions ==
- Former Minister for Information and Tourism
- Former Minister for Information, Presidential and Special Affairs
- Former President, National House of Chiefs
- Member, Ghana National Petroleum Corporation Board
- Member, Legal Affairs Committee, NHC
- Member, International Union for the Scientific Study of Population
- Member, Social Science and Medicine Africa Network
- Vice Chairman, National Population Council
- Former Head, Department of Geography and Resource Development (UG)
- Editor, Bulletin of the Ghana Geographical Association

== Appointments ==
In 2017, President Nana Akuffo-Addo appointed him to be a board member of the Ghana National Petroleum Corporation.
