= Akan art =

Ghanaian art among the Akans

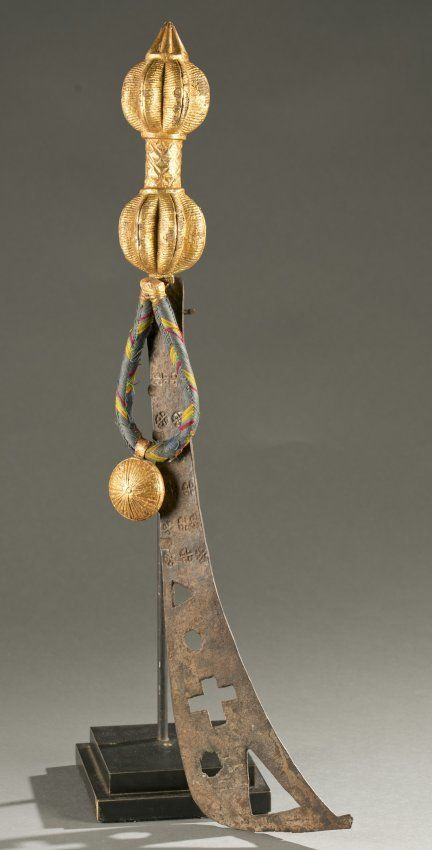
Akan Sword

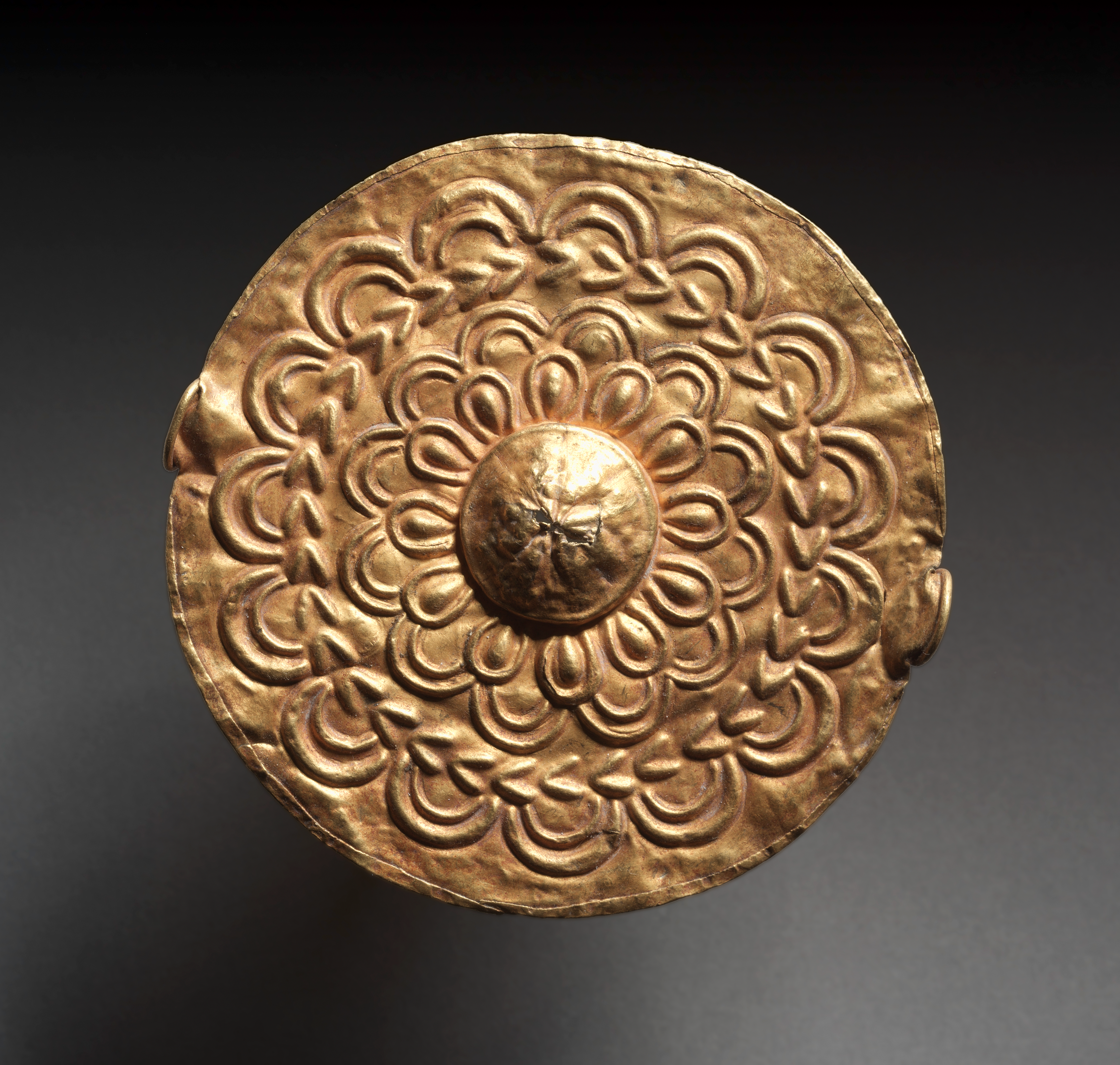
Pectoral Disk, 19th century

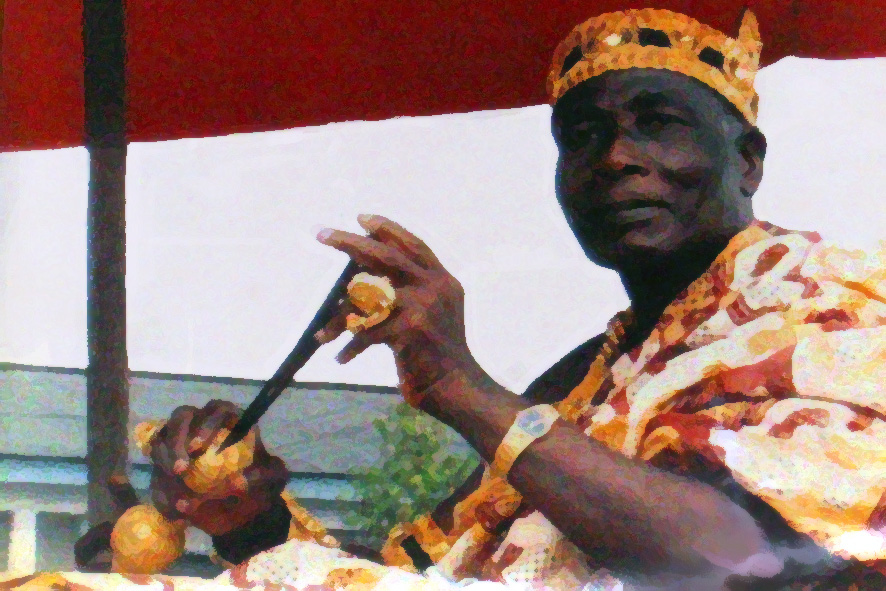
The late Nana Adu Ababio II, Ankobeahene (Chief) of Amanokrom, wearing gold ornaments

Akan art is an art form that originated among the Akan people of Southern Ghana. Akan art is known for vibrant artistic traditions, including textiles, sculpture, Akan goldweights, as well as gold and silver jewelry. The Akan people are known for their strong connection between visual and verbal expressions and a distinctive blending of art and philosophy. Akan chiefs managed generations worth of gold regalia; finely crafted objects such as crowns, beads, bracelets, pectoral disks, swords and sword ornaments, linguist staffs, and umbrella finials.

== Regalia as Ensemble ==
The regalia represented throughout Akan culture has carried significance across several items and objects. Several of the objects utilized as bodily adornment become components that convey status. Specifically worn or carried for ceremonial purposes, the pieces of regalia represented demonstrates the opulent diversity between the objects.

== Gold as material ==
Gold holds a significant socio-political role in the highly structured Akan society; it was used as a display of power as well as a way to legitimize authority. History recognizes the Akan for their sophisticated gold-working traditions, technical proficiency in casting metal and perfection of the lost wax casting process. Akan culture considers gold a sacred material, therefore, the artwork and jewelry made of gold reflects a great deal of value, whether it is made for political display, artistic expression, or more practical trading purposes. Craftspeople believe the material to have a spiritual dimension and hold it as sacred, it is a primary medium for ritual objects and royal ornamentation. Typically, only rulers and the social elite would wear gold or use gold objects. However, such gold regalia are not considered personal objects, but are collectively owned and controlled by the Stool (the seat of power).

== Goldweights ==
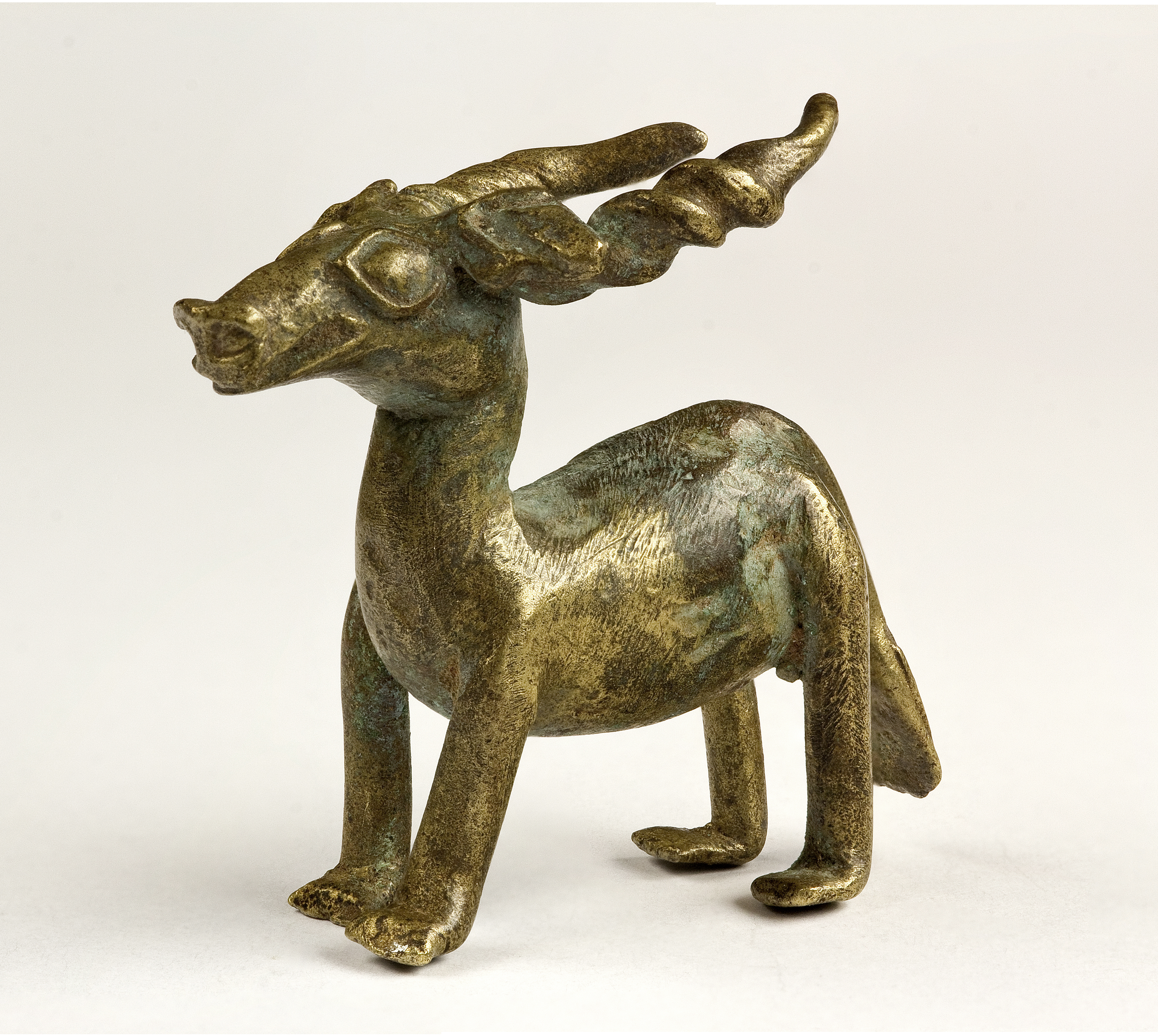
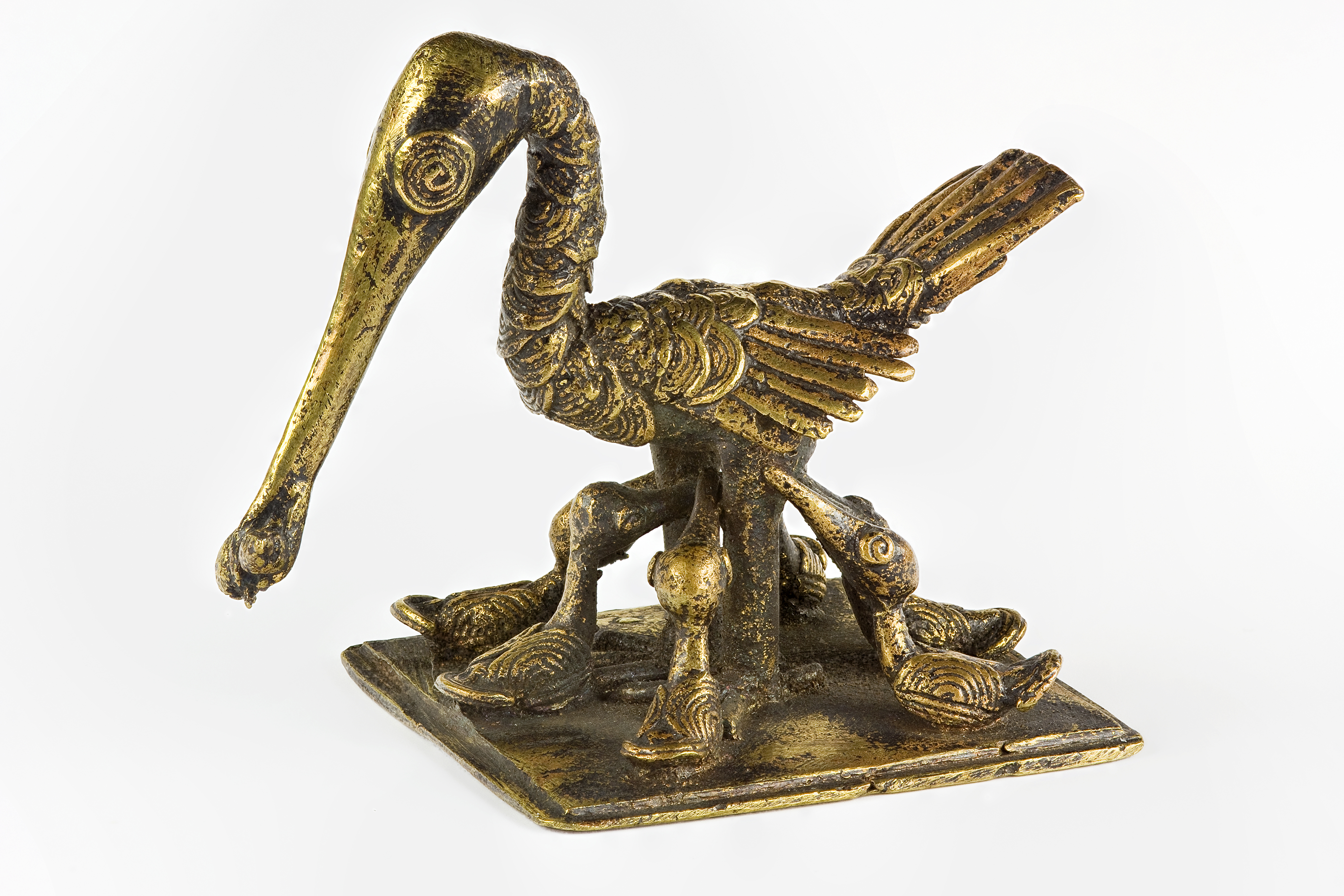
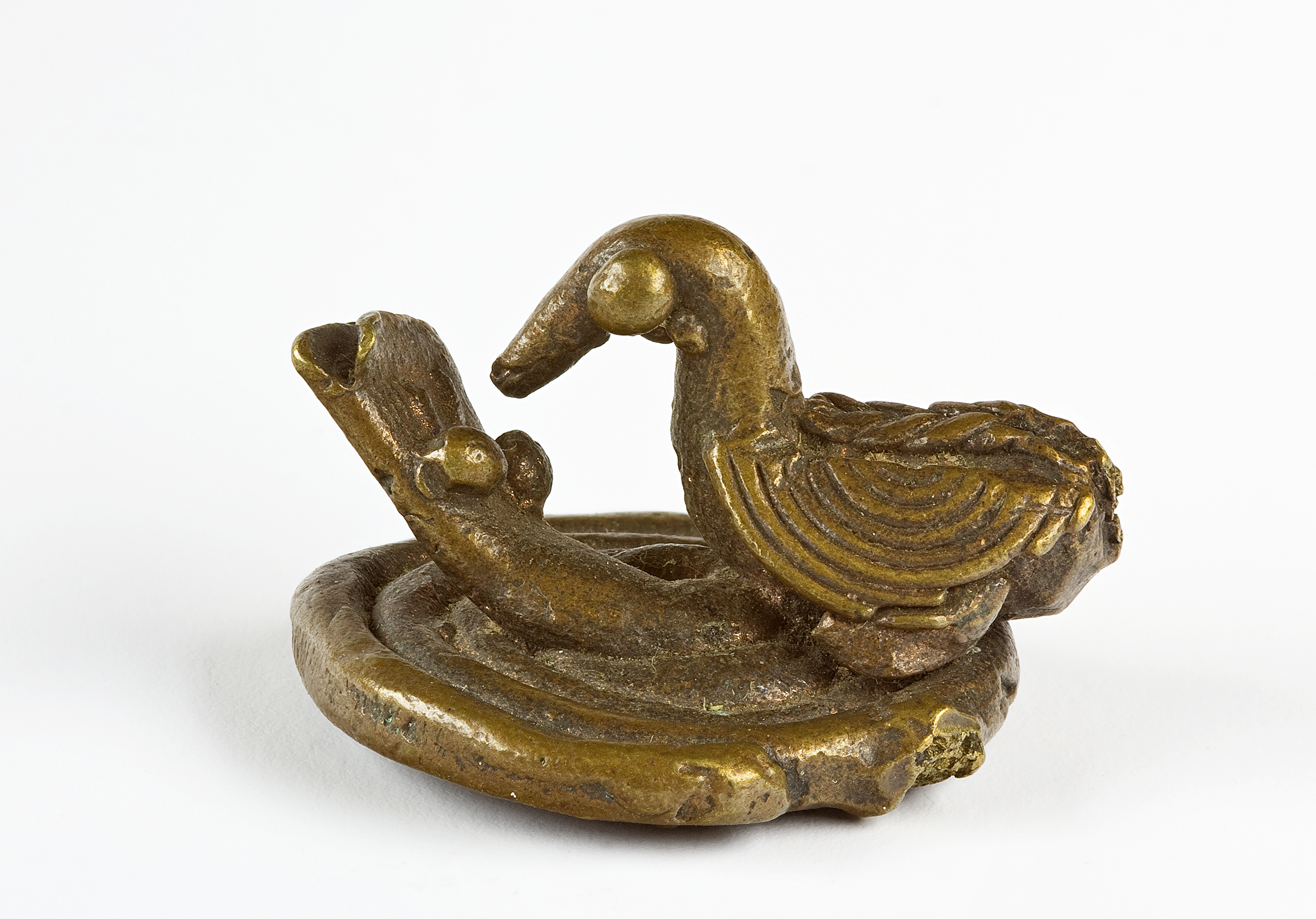
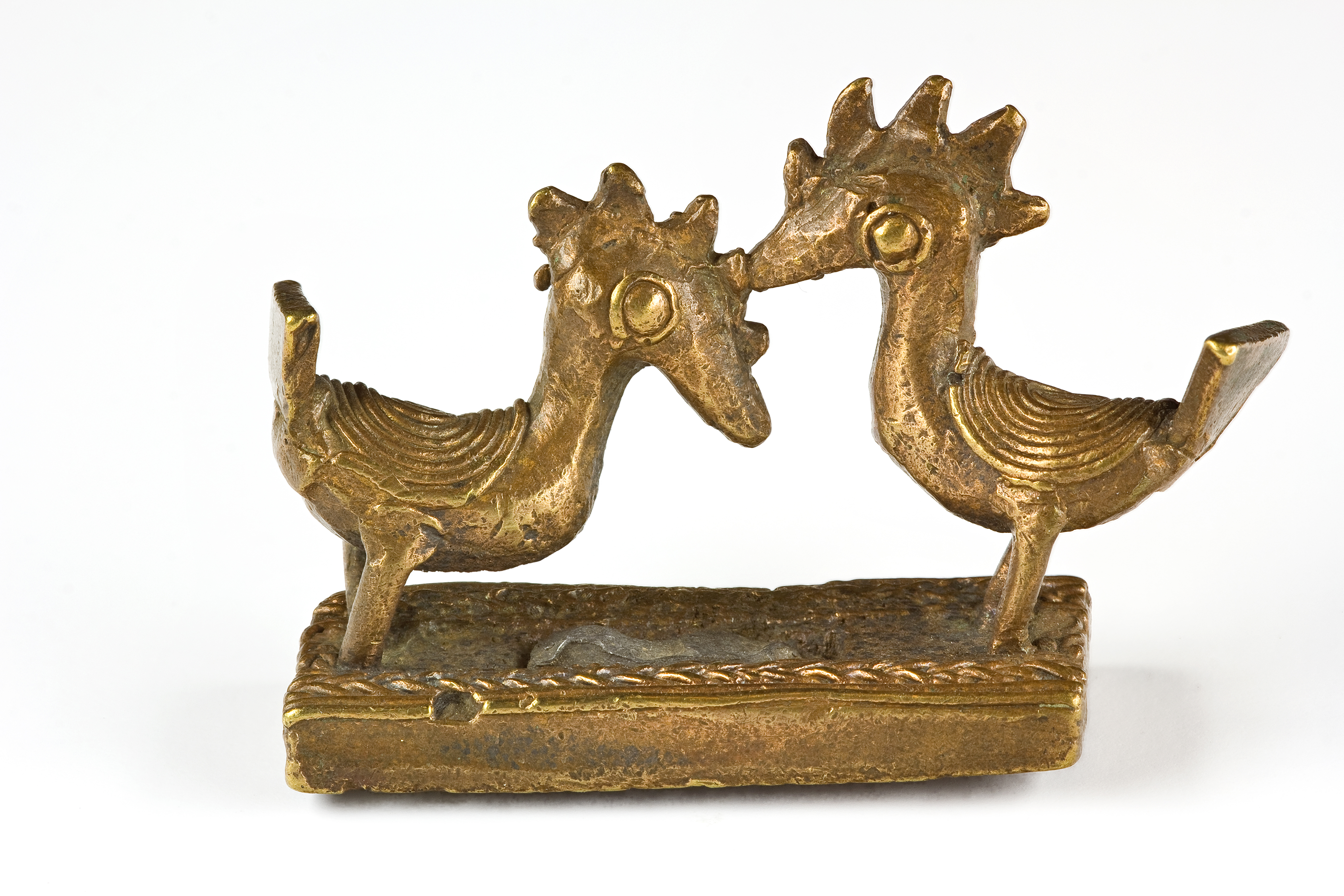
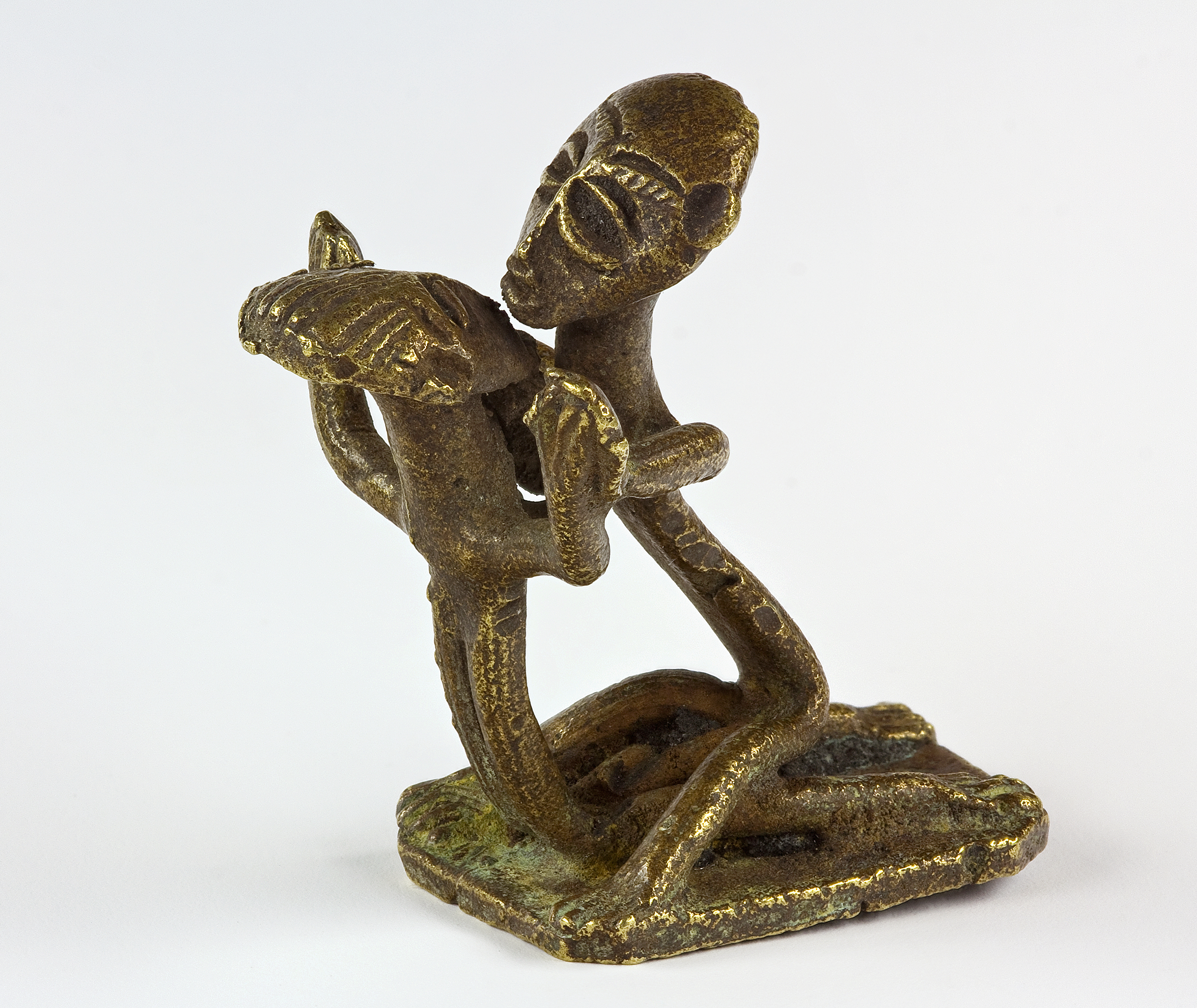
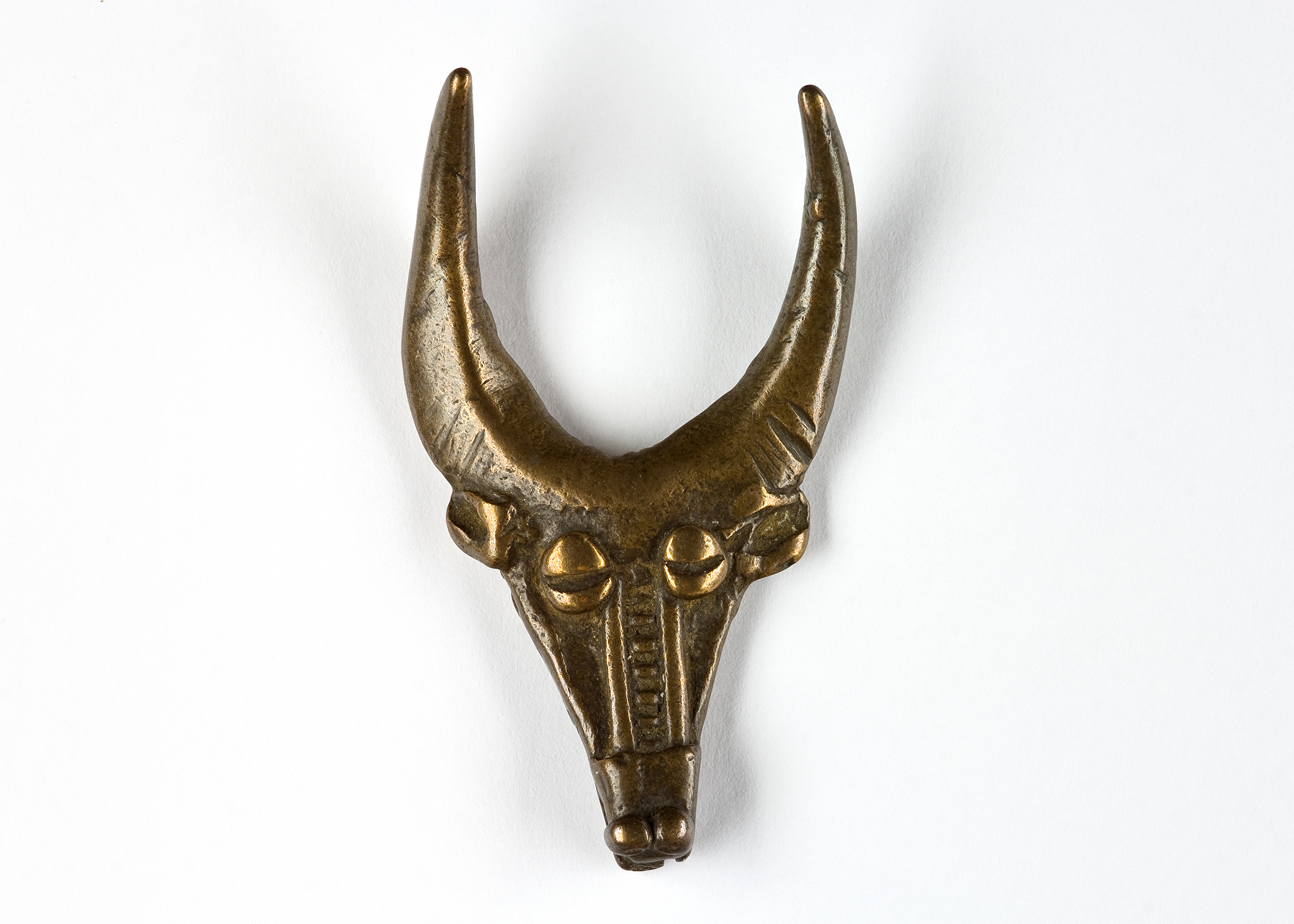
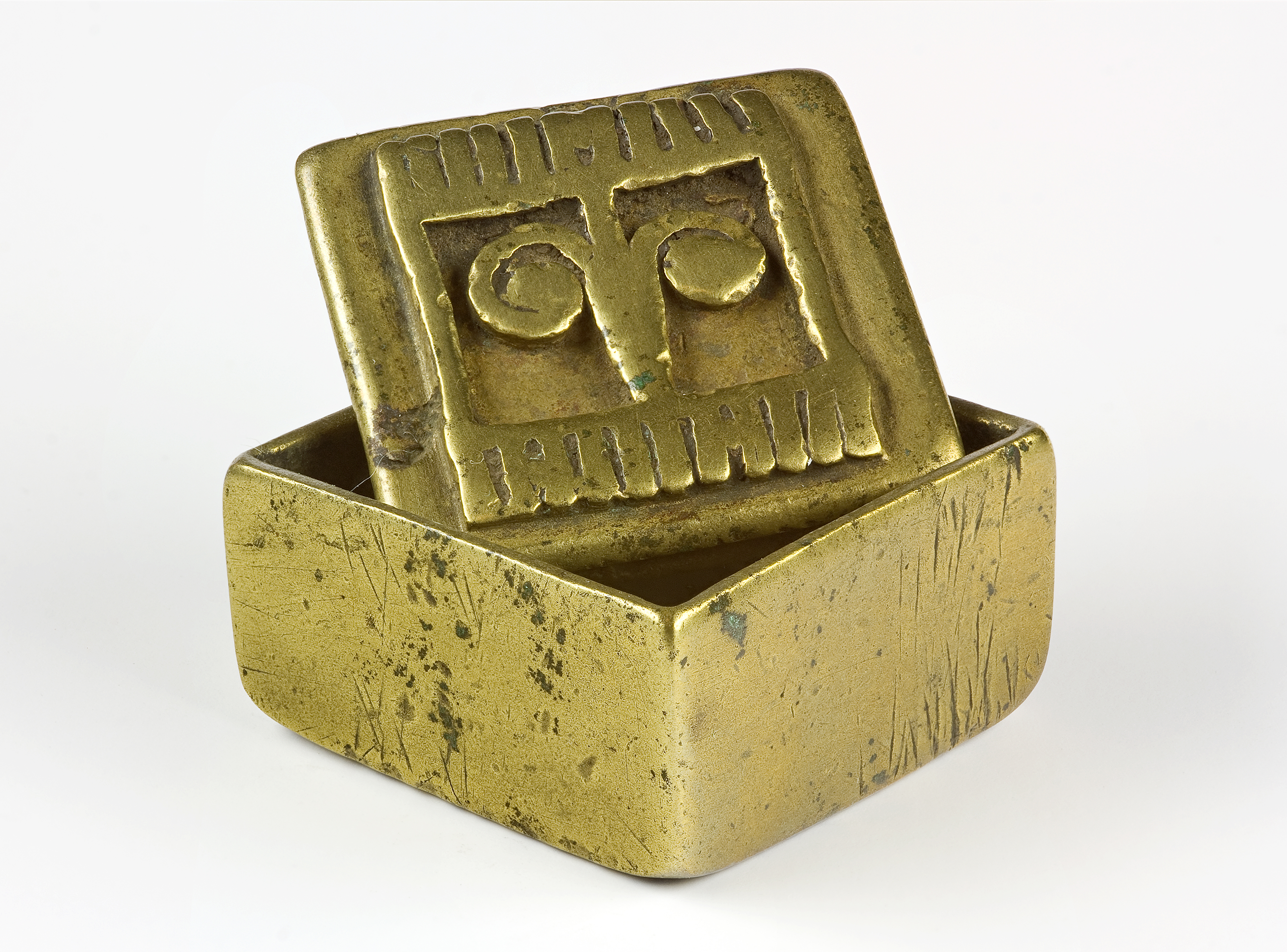
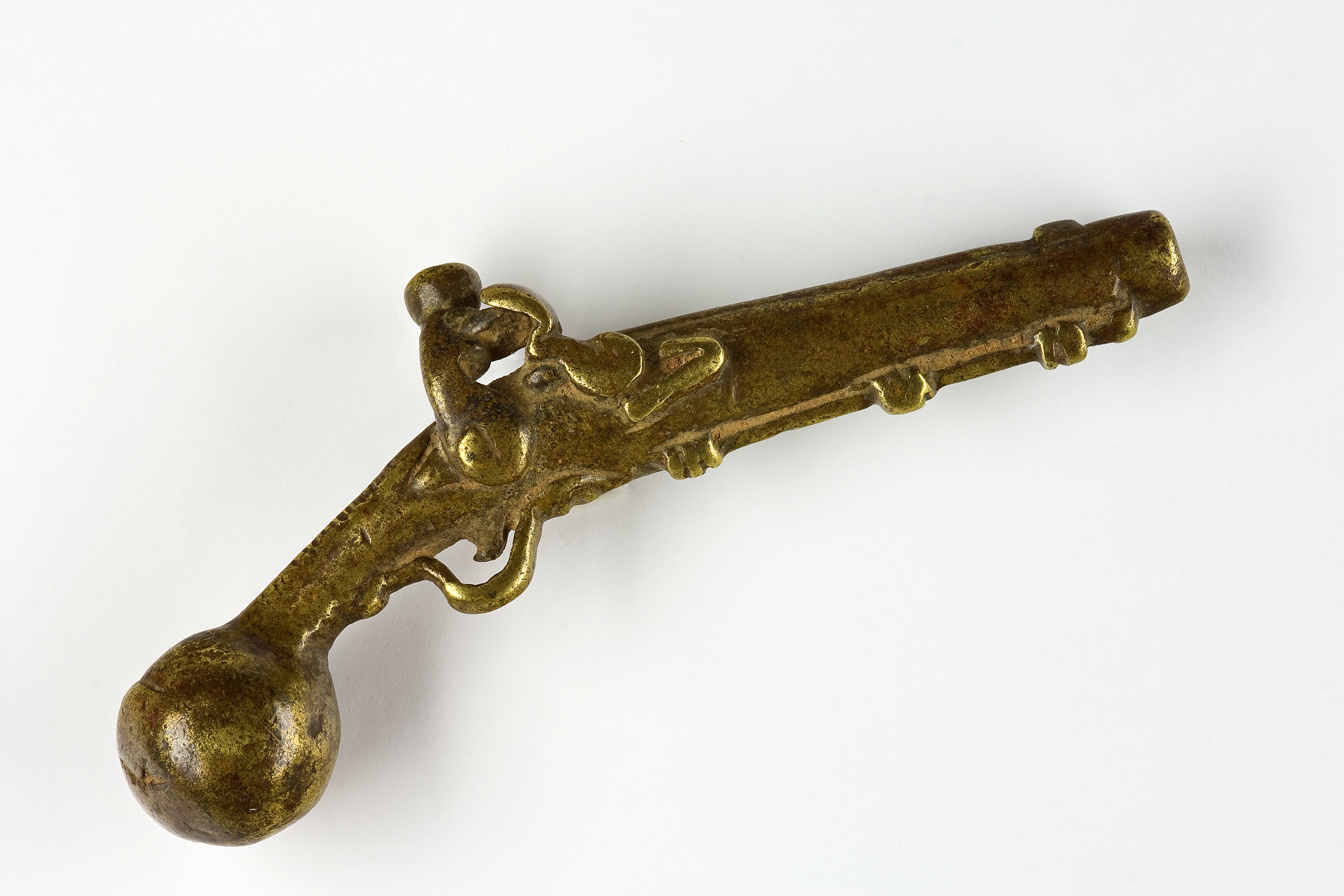
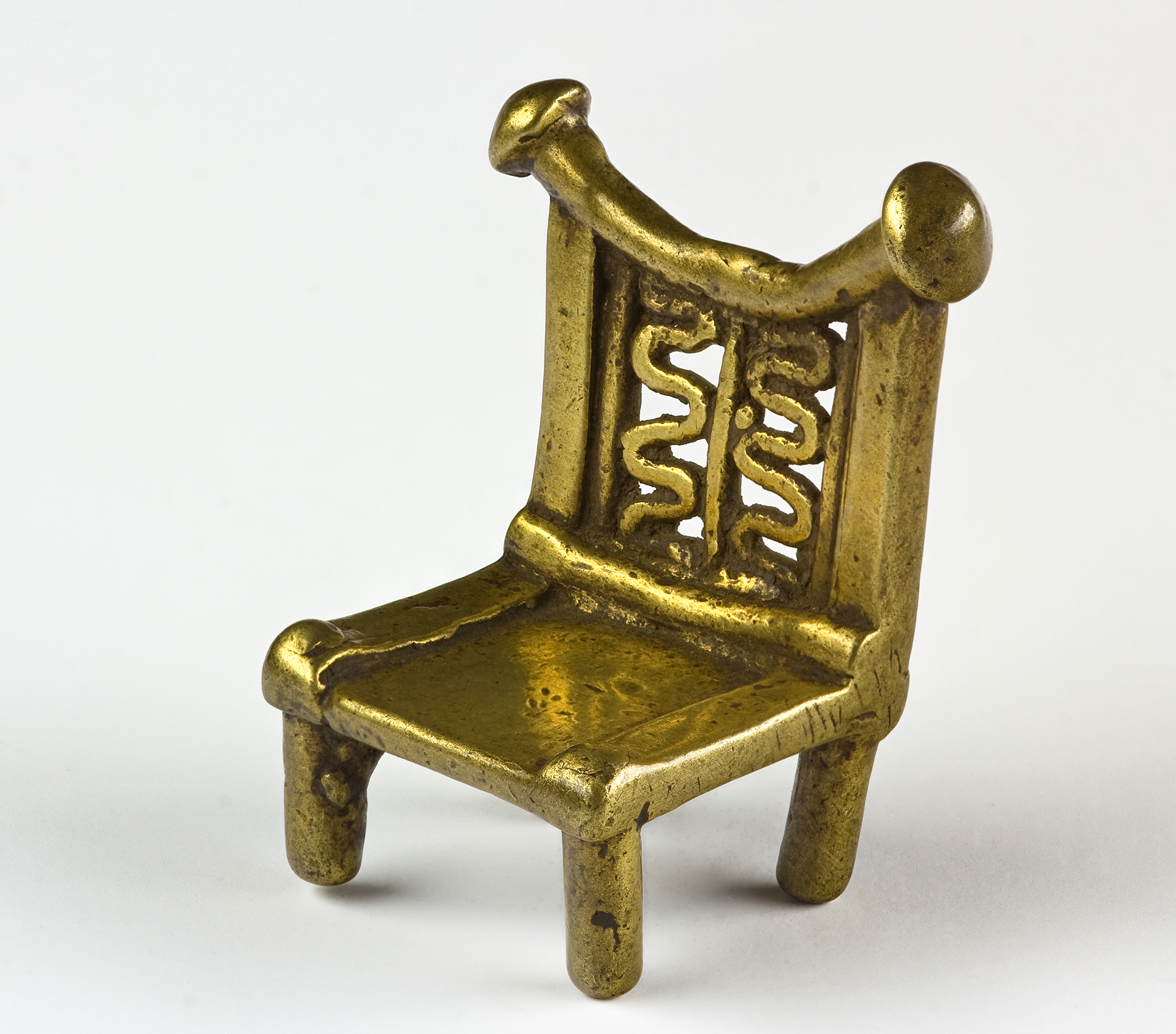
Akan gold weights

One of the most common pieces of Akan art are the Akan goldweights. The gold weights were made of copper, bronze, and brass. They were cast using a method of casting known as lost-wax technique or "cire perdue". Goldweights were created for economic transactions involving gold. Although it is not clear when the convention of weights were first introduced, scholars suggest that the Akan first traded gold with Muslim merchants from the West African interior, long before European contact. Their weight system corresponds to the Islamic weight system of North Africa, and appear to be part of early sub-Saharan trade.

The gold weights served a multitude of roles in Akan culture and everyday life. Akan goldweights are not only used as counterbalances on the scales used in gold trade, but also serve as visual representations of oral tradition, representations of proverbs, and as pictographic script in the social and political system as well as in the system of communal knowledge of the Akan people. Goldweights were used in everyday trade and commerce, as well as in accounting, as a type of fraction or counter. According to the Akan scholar Nitecki, Akan gold weights were "created and used like spoken language to commemorate social or historical events or entities, to express philosophical or religious views, aspirations, and dreams, or simply to ask questions, or to express displeasure". The symbolism found in these gold weights references specific local proverbs or fables which would be understood by contemporaries of this context.

There are four major categories of goldweights, based on what subject matter is depicted. The first kind of gold weights depict people. The second consist of the local flora and fauna. The third category are likened to man-made objects. The final category are abstract and open for interpretation.

== Linguist staffs ==
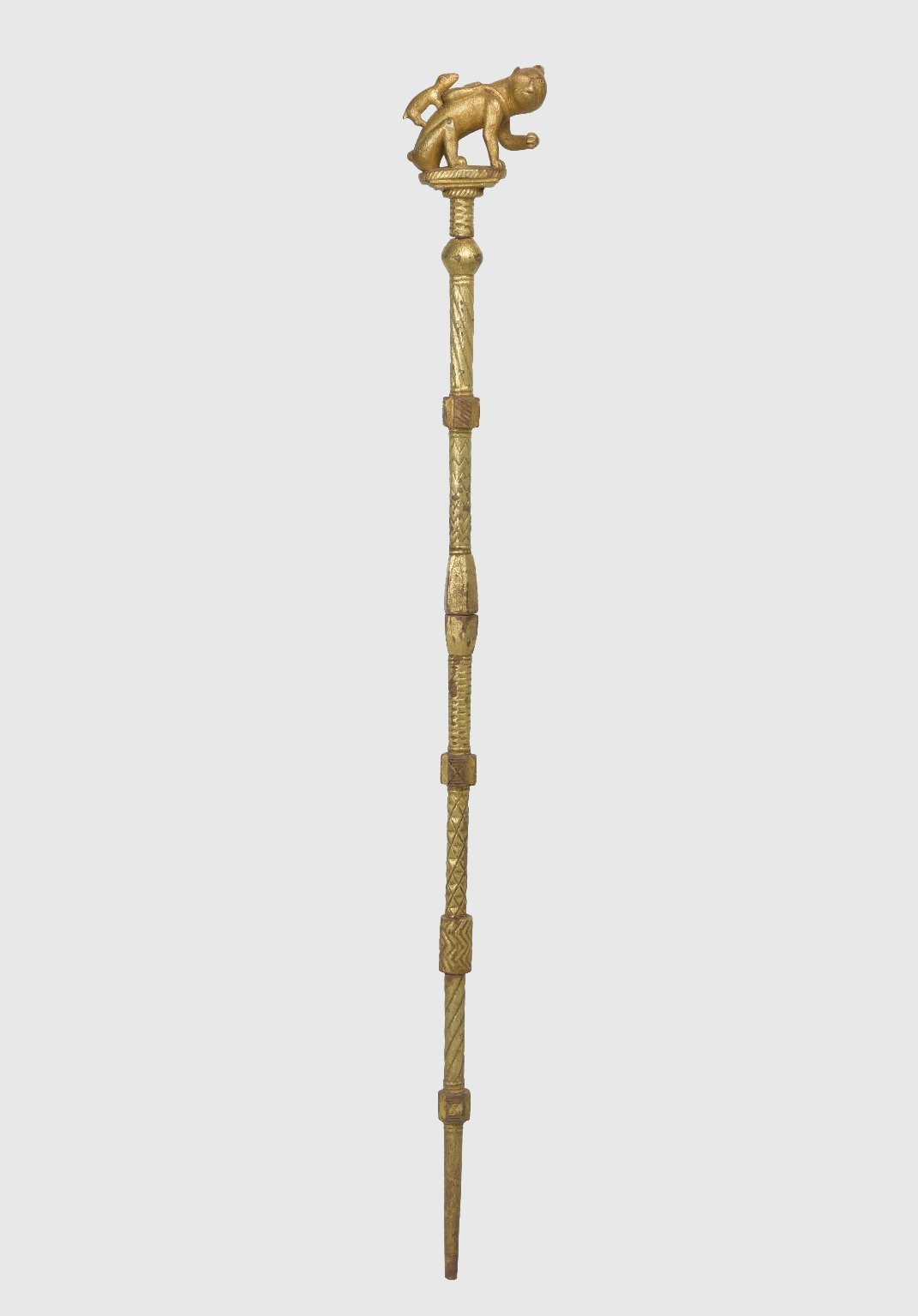
Linguist Okyeame Staff

Akan linguist staffs are among the gold, art objects that serve as functional tools in Akan societal traditions. Staffs are typically works of carved wood and gold leaf which aid in the process of communication between the government and citizens. The structure of the staff consists of the stick and a carved ornament at the top that represents one or more Akan proverbs. The staff is foremost an identifier of the political advisory role of the linguist, or okyeame. Because of the prominence of oral tradition in Akan culture, the okyeame is a highly respected role, serving as both a counselor to a chief and a messenger to the people. The creation and sharing of proverbs orally allows the Akan to access information about cultural customs, legal matters, and a variety of knowledge in specified fields; the linguist staff signifies a badge of authority for upholding these traditions. Like other Akan art, the linguist staffs are an example of work that chiefly express a functional, political, and intellectual meaning rather than a purely aesthetic one.

== Stools ==
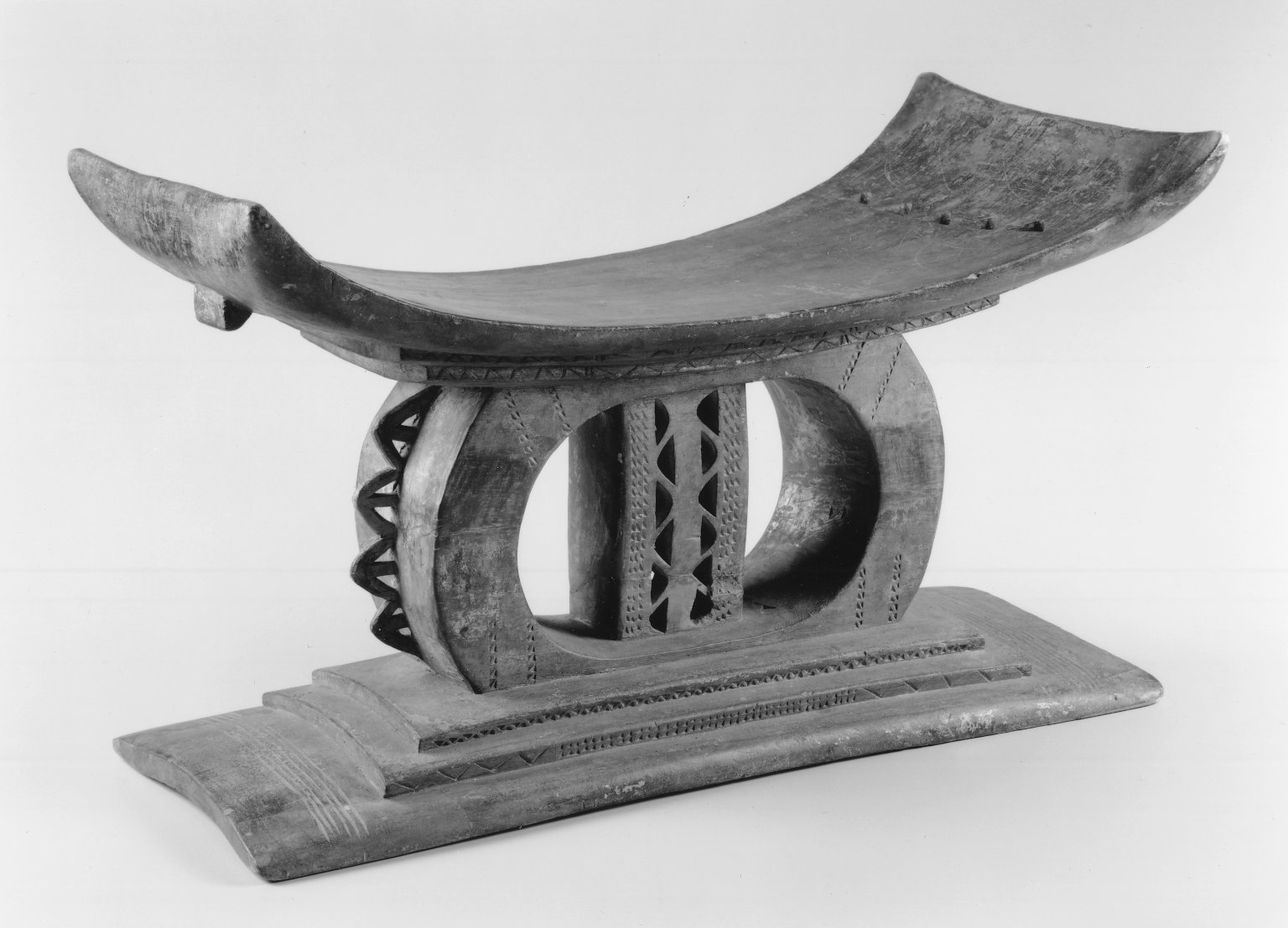
Akan Stool

Stools carved from wood are an essential part of Akan culture. The royal stool of an Akan Chief is a highly revered symbol of authority in Akan society. All chiefs, kings, and queen mothers would receive a stool upon their induction in order to visually convey their authority. These stools often display elaborate metal decorations, such as geometric patterns or animal iconography. The stools represent a chief's personal identity in relation to their role as leaders, making them a crucial signifier of the individual's power. The stools of favored chiefs are blackened with smoke in a ritual upon the chief's passing, and stored in a special room in order to preserve their soul within it. The size of a stool is indicative of who may have owned it. A stool that is larger would belong to a man, or someone who was politically more powerful.

The golden stool of the king is the most revered.

== Jewelry ==
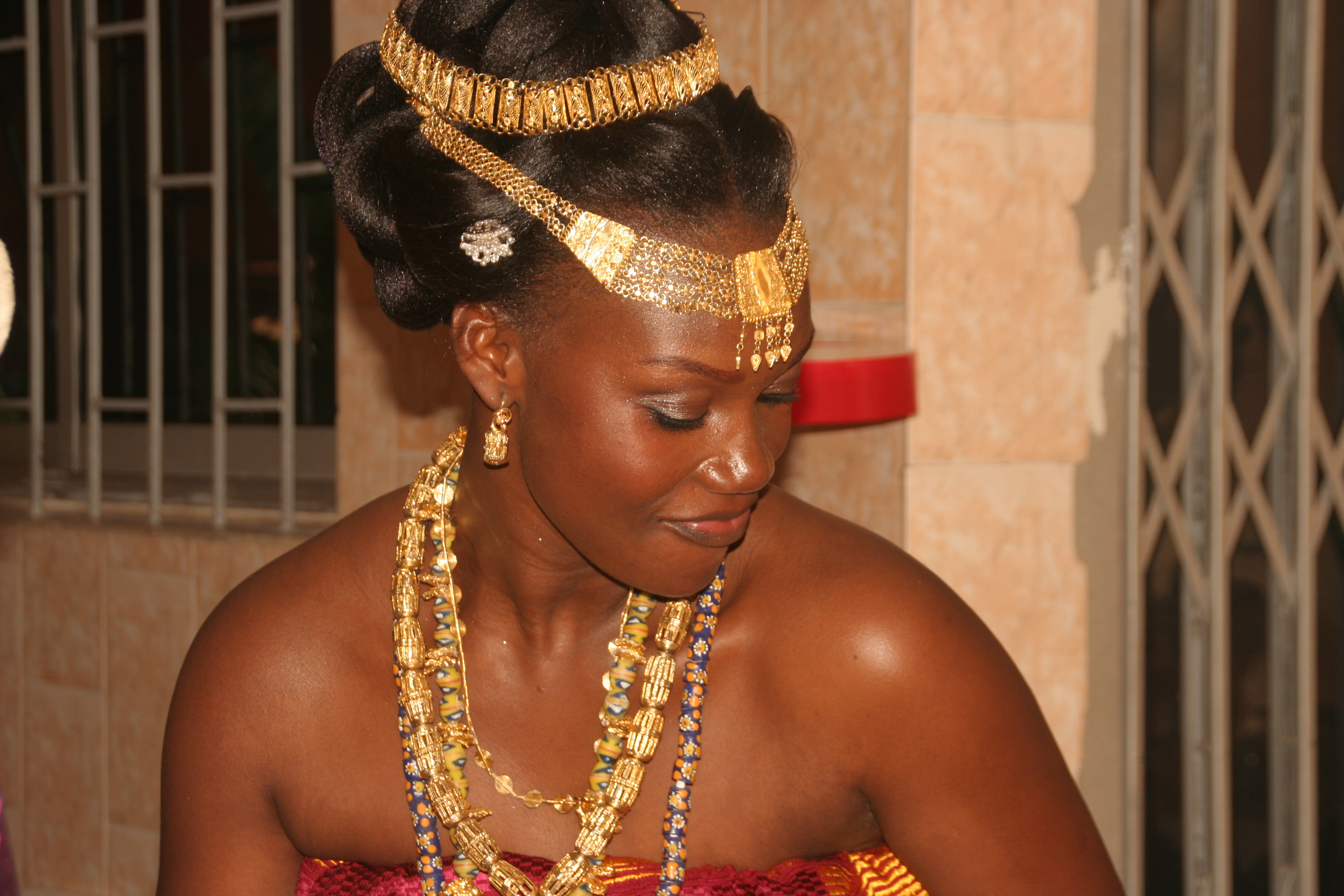
An Akan woman with gold ornaments

Jewelry takes a variety of forms in Akan culture. The Akan people create neck-wear, wrist bands, elbow-wear, knee-wear, finger adornment such as rings, and ankle-wear. Gender-specific jewelry includes hat pins and headbands for men and earrings and hairpins for the women. Historically, wearing gold was an honor reserved for the rulers and social elite, but nowadays anyone with the means to acquire them may wear gold adornments. Royal Finger rings (kawa) were primarily worn by Akan chiefs as one piece of their ceremonial regalia. The size and expressive design of the rings are worn together on several fingers. Such beliefs vary between different principalities in the region, some being more egalitarian than others. When dressed in State, chiefs and their entourages decorate themselves heavily with gold. Jewelry was not only used for decoration; some gold adornments held specific powers and could be worn for protection. Due to the generative power associated with gold in Akan society, some women would wear precious gold beads around their waist to enhance fertility.

== Mforowa ==
Mforowa, or forowa, are vessels that were used for mortuary rituals, typically made of brass. They are distinctly Asante, and have been found near the coastal region of Ghana. They are cylindrical, and decorated with geometric and animal patterns. The lids are a round, dome shape, attributing to the metalworking process. The precision in which they were crafted indicate that they were items of prestige. They held shea butter mixtures, including gold dust, cowrie shells, and herbs.

== See also ==
- Adinkra symbols
- Kente cloth
- Nsodie
