= Sankofa =

Ghanaian mythical creature

The sankofa symbol

Sankofa (pronounced SAHN-koh-fah) is a word in the Akan language of Ghana meaning "to retrieve" (literally "go back and get"; san - to return; ko - to go; fa - to fetch, to seek and take) This Adinkra symbol is represented either with a stylized heart shape or by a bird with its head turned backwards while its feet face forward carrying a precious egg in its mouth. Sankofa is often associated with the proverb, "Se wo were fi na wosankofa a yenkyi," which translates as: "It is not wrong to go back for that which you have forgotten."

The sankofa bird appears frequently in traditional Akan art, and has also been adopted as an important symbol in an African-American and African Diaspora context to represent the need to reflect on the past to build a successful future. It is one of the most widely dispersed adinkra symbols, appearing in modern jewelry, tattoos, and T-shirts.

== Akan symbolism ==
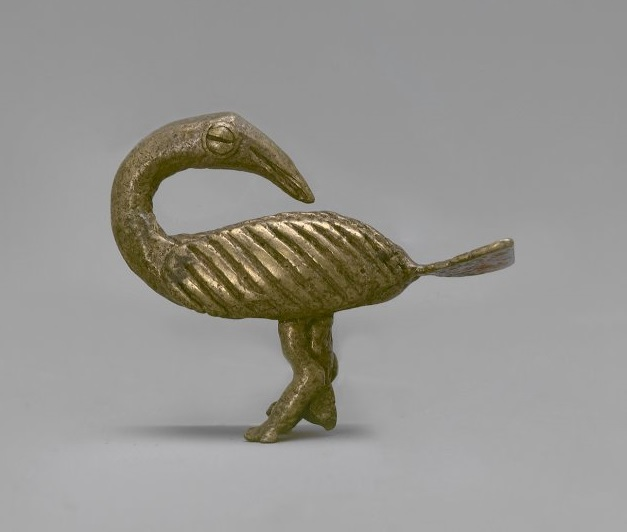
Akan goldweight sankofa

The Akan people of Ghana use an adinkra symbol to represent the same concept. One version of it is similar to the eastern symbol of a heart, and another is that of a bird with its head turned backwards to symbolically capture an egg depicted above its back. It symbolizes taking from the past what is good and bringing it into the present in order to make positive progress through the benevolent use of knowledge. Adinkra symbols are used by the Akan people to express proverbs and other philosophical ideas.

The sankofa bird also appears on carved wooden Akan stools, in Akan goldweights, on some ruler's state umbrella or parasol (ntuatire) finials and on the staff finials of some court linguists. It functions to foster mutual respect and unity in tradition.

== Use in North America and the United Kingdom ==
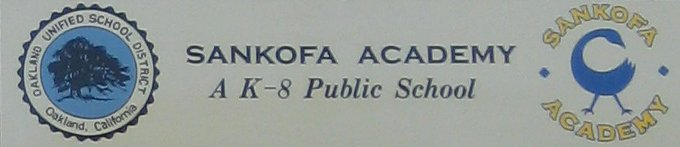
The sankofa image has been adopted by numerous afro-centric organizations in North America

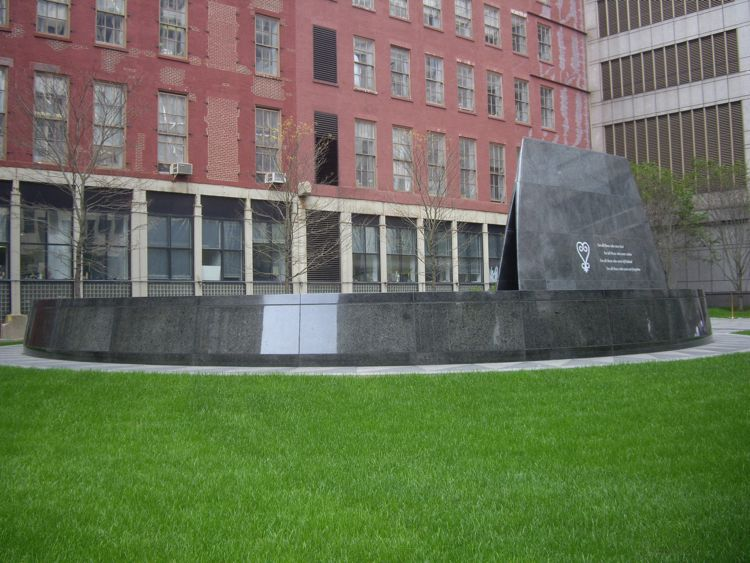
The African Burial Ground National Monument

During a building excavation in Lower Manhattan in 1991, a cemetery for free and enslaved Africans was discovered. Over 400 remains were identified, but one coffin in particular stood out. Nailed into its wooden lid were iron tacks, 51 of which formed an enigmatic, heart-shaped design that some have interpreted as a sankofa symbol. The site is now a national monument, known as the African Burial Ground National Monument, administered by the National Park Service. A copy of the design found on the coffin lid is prominently carved onto a large black granite memorial at the center of the site.

The National Museum of African American History and Culture uses the heart-shaped symbol on its website. The "mouse over" for the image reads: "The Sankofa represents the importance of learning from the past."

Sankofa symbols show themselves all over cities such as Washington, D.C., and New Orleans, particularly in fence designs.

Janet Jackson has a sankofa tattoo on her inner right wrist. The symbol is also featured in her 1997 album The Velvet Rope, as well as on the supporting tour.

Sankofa is an event used by Saint Louis University to honour African-American student graduates and students who graduate with degrees in African American studies.

The symbol and name were used in the 1993 film Sankofa by Haile Gerima, as well as in the graphic title of the film 500 Years Later (2005) by Owen 'Alik Shahadah.

A UK stage production by Adzido Pan-African Dance Ensemble, scripted by Margaret Busby and premiered in 1999, was entitled Sankofa.

The African-American string band Sankofa Strings, founded in 2005 by Sule Greg C. Wilson, Rhiannon Giddens, and Dom Flemons, was featured in the 2007 jug band documentary Chasin' Gus' Ghost. The band self-released the CD Colored Aristocracy in 2006. A second iteration of the band Sankofa, with Wilson and Flemons, as well as Ndidi Onukwulu and Allison Russell, released the CD The Uptown Strut in 2012.

Cassandra Wilson recorded the song "Sankofa", which appeared on her 1993 album Blue Light 'til Dawn.

A Sankofa bird appears several times in the BBC television show Taboo. It was carved into the floor of a slave ship by James Keziah Delaney and appears as a tattoo on his upper back and as a drawing within the fireplace of his mother's old room.

The protagonist in the 2021 science-fiction novella Remote Control by Nnedi Okorafor goes by the name Sankofa.

On December 14, 2023, a committee of the City of Toronto in Canada unanimously selected the name Sankofa Square for Yonge-Dundas Square as part of a stated effort to "right wrongs, confront anti-Black racism and build a more inclusive Toronto". "However, deputantes like Daniel Tate took the opportunity to urge the Mayor and committee to reverse course altogether and keep the Yonge-Dundas name. Tate brought a petition with what he says are 30,000 signatures opposing the decision."
