= Robert Sutherland Rattray =

British anthropologist

Robert Sutherland Rattray, GBE, known as Captain R. S. Rattray (1881 in India – 1938), was a barrister and held a diploma in anthropology from Oxford.

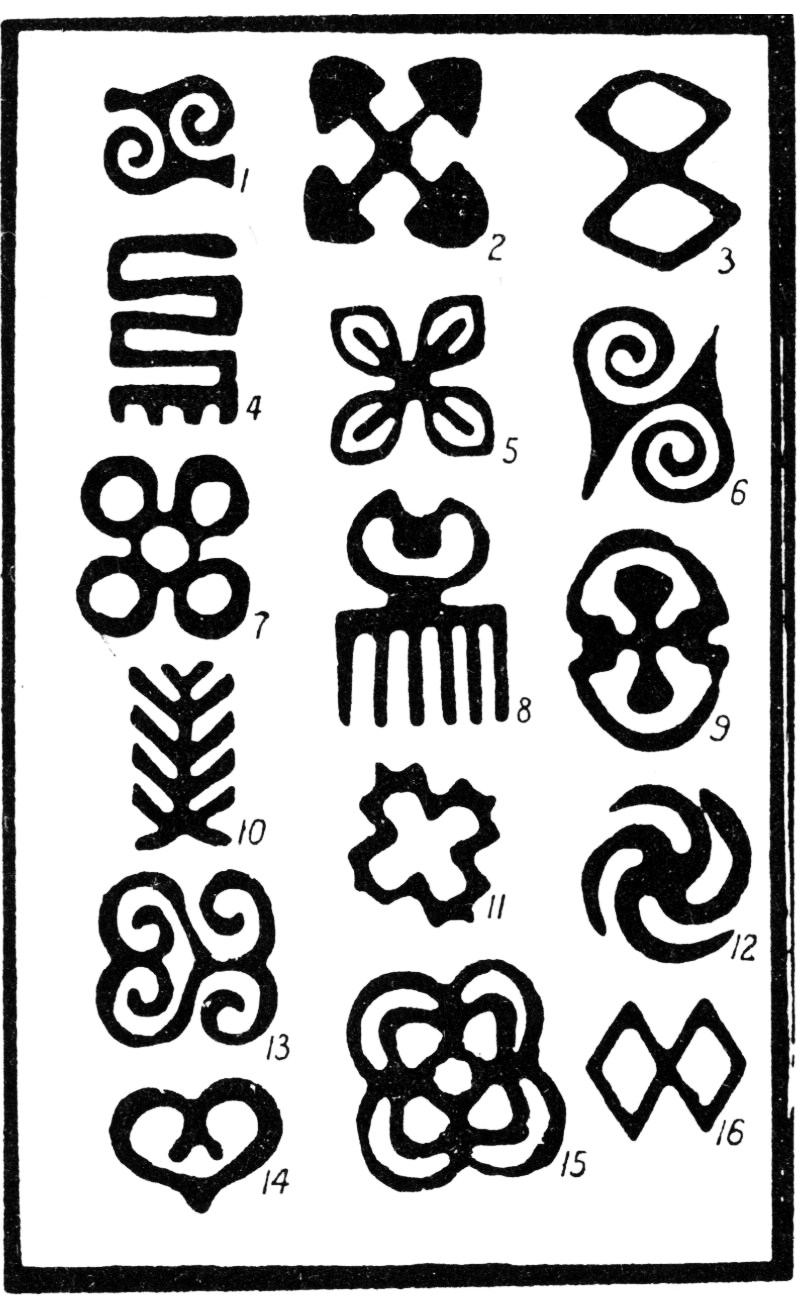
Traditional adinkra symbols gathered by Rattray, symbolizing values, often with proverbs associated with symbol

He was an early Africanist and student of the Ashanti. He was one of the early writers on Oware, and on Ashanti gold weights. An amusement park constructed by the Kumasi Metropolitan Assembly is named Rattray Park in his memory.

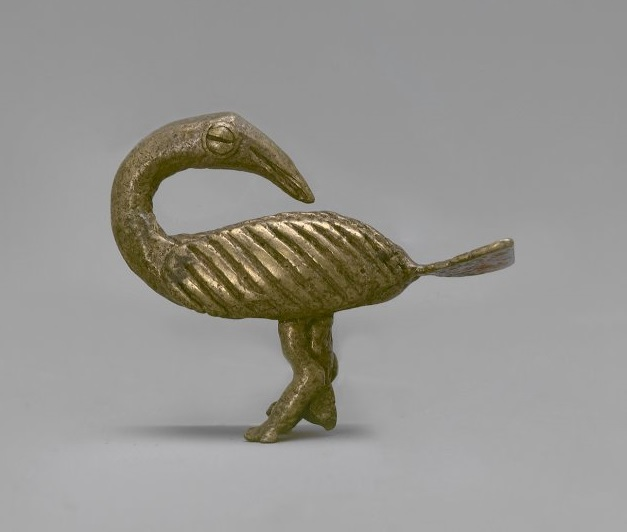
Example of Akan gold weight described by Rattray. It symbolizes the proverb "One must turn to the past to move forward."

== Life ==
Rattray was born in India to Scottish parents. In 1906, he joined the Gold Coast Customs Service. In 1911, he became the Assistant District Commissioner at Ejura. Learning local languages, he was appointed head of the Anthropological Department of Asante in 1921. He retired in 1930. He was killed while flying a glider in 1938.

"When a new Anthropological Department was set up in Ashanti in the 1920s, Rattray was charged with the task of re-searching the law and constitution of Ashanti, to assist the colonial administrators in ruling the Ashantis. With his office in the Anthropological Department in Ashanti, Rattray set out to do detailed and voluminous research on Ashanti religion, customs law, art, beliefs, folktales, and proverbs. His personal contact with the people of Ashanti afforded him an intimate knowledge of their culture, which is reflected in his thoughtful and nuanced writing on them."

== Ethnographic collections ==
Like many anthropologists of his day, Rattray collected many ethnographic artefacts during his time in Africa, took photographs, collected folk tales and language information and experimented with sound recording. These materials mostly ended up in the collections of the Pitt Rivers Museum at the University of Oxford, although smaller collections are found in the British Museum and elsewhere. His fieldwork papers are held in the archives of the Royal Anthropological Institute (UK). His sound recordings are archived at the British Library.

== Works ==
- Vernon Blake, "The Aesthetic of Ashanti".
- Hausa Folk-lore, translated from Maalam Shaihua's original, 1913, 2 volumes.
- Ashanti Proverbs: the primitive ethics of a savage people: translated from the original with grammatical and anthropological notes, 1916 (repub. 1969). With a preface by Sir Hugh Clifford.
- Ashanti, 1923.
- (ed.) Religion and Art in Ashanti, Oxford University Press, 1927.
- Ashanti Law and Constitution, 1929.
- Akan-Ashanti Folk-Tales. Collected and translated by ... R. S. Rattray ... and illustrated by Africans of the Gold Coast Colony, 1930.
- The Tribes of the Ashanti Hinterland Oxford: Clarendon Press, 2 vols., 1932.
- An Elementary Mōle Grammar with a Vocabulary of Over 1000 Words for the Use of Officials in the Northern Territories of the Gold Coast. Clarendon Press, 1918.
- Ashanti Proverbs (The Primitive Ethics of a Savage People) Translated From the Original With Grammatical and Anthropological Notes. (1916).
