= Fihankra =

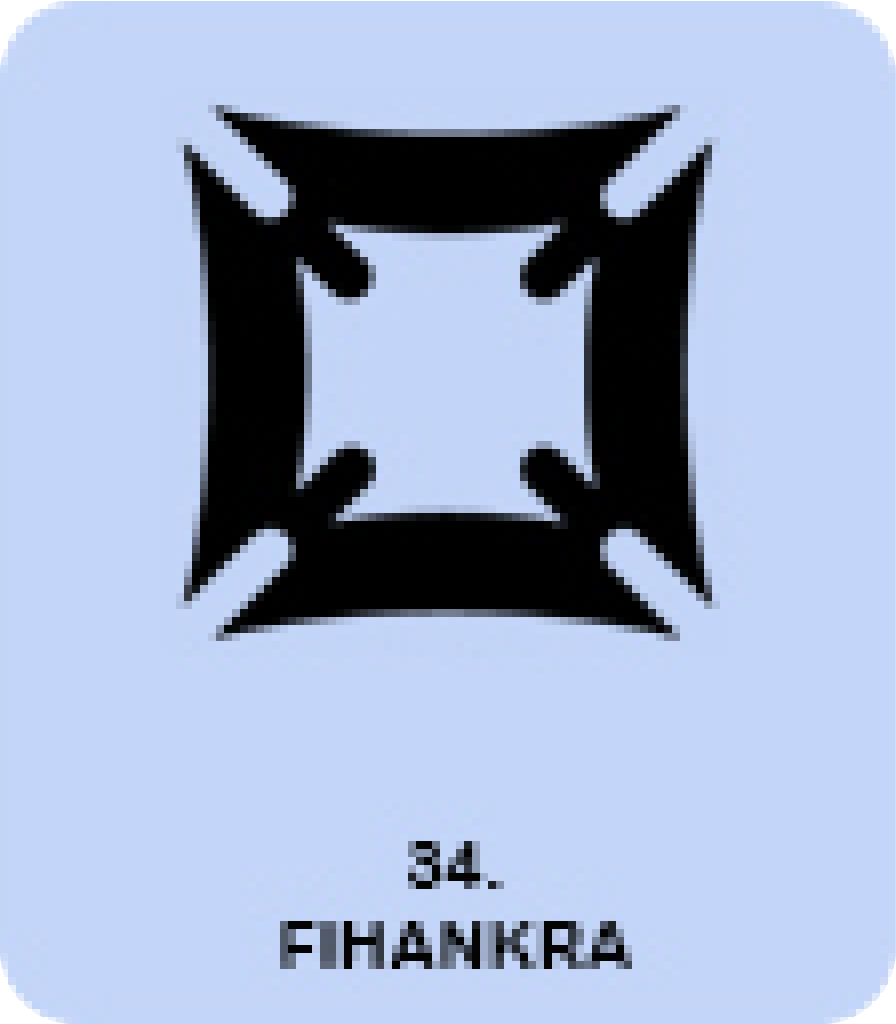
Fihankra

The Fihankra is an Adinkra symbol used by Ghana’s Akan people. The symbols represents security, safety, and importance of creating an environment which is protective.

== Etymology ==
The term "fihankra" comes from the Akan words of "fi(e)" and "hankra", meaning "house" and "circle" respectively. The literal translation of "fihankra" is "house circle" or "circular house". The symbol is emblematic of providing communal security, unity, and shelter in households.
