= Hausa Folk-lore =

1913 book by Maalam Shaihua

Hausa Folk-lore is a book by Maalam Shaihua, translated by R. Sutherland Rattray, published in 1913. In two volumes, it contains a pronunciation guide, thirty folk-stories of the Hausa people of Africa (twenty-one in volume I, nine in volume II) as well as some information regarding their customs. The book is notable in that it was actually written by one of the Hausa, not a European, as is common in such books from the time period.
