= Nsodie =

Ceramics-sculpture highlighted in The MET collection

Memorial Head
- nsodie
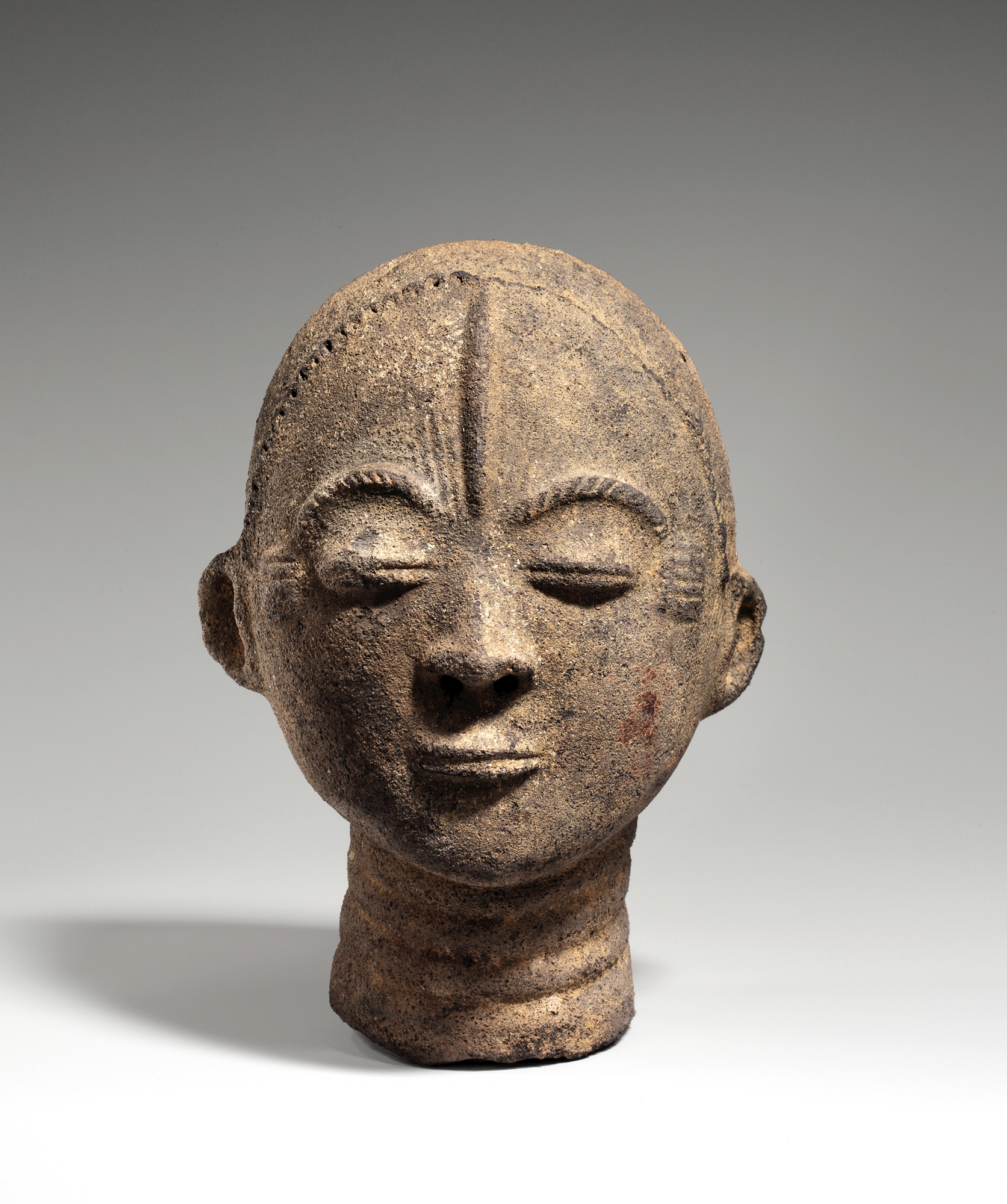
- Year: 17th century
- Location: Metropolitan Museum of Art
- Accession No.: 1978.412.563
- Identifiers: The Met object ID: 311024

The Memorial Head or Nsodie is a type of ceramic portrait sculpture of the Akan peoples, believed to have been created in the 17th and 18th centuries by female artists to depict royal personages.

Examples are held in major collections, such as the Metropolitan Museum of Art in New York.

== History ==
The Memorial Head (Nsodie) at the Metropolitan Museum of Art was created in the 17th–mid-18th century. It was found in Ghana, Twifo-Heman traditional area from the Akan peoples. These heads were commissioned by the Akan peoples to memorialize royal personages before death. It was thought that elderly women artists fulfilled these commissions. These heads were placed in memorial groves called asensie, or “place of the pots, ”where prayers, libations and offerings could be offered."

== Interpretation ==
Nsodie's depict a human head and are made of terra cotta. Scholars differ in opinion as to whether the heads depicted specific priests, chiefs, royal personages, or if they were commemorative effigies embodying the wisdom and experience of important people. The heads are thought to stylize particular features of a personage and are not a realistic depiction.
