= Adinkra symbols =

Ghanaian symbols representing concepts or aphorisms

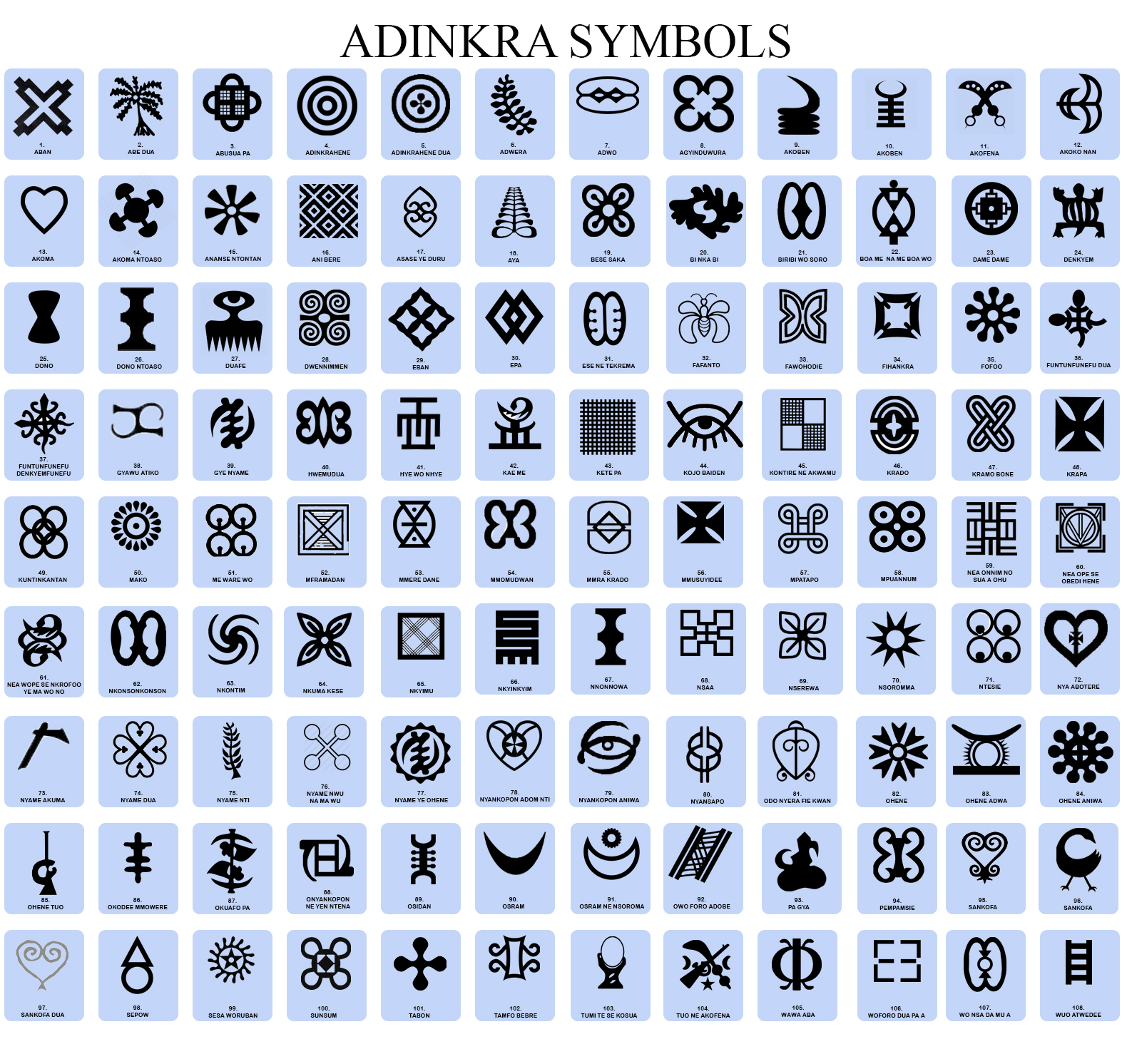
Samples of recorded Adinkra symbols

Adinkra are symbols from the Akan people of Ghana that represent concepts or aphorisms. Adinkra are used extensively in fabrics, logos and pottery. They are incorporated into walls and other architectural features. Adinkra symbols appear on some traditional Akan goldweights. The symbols are also carved on stools for domestic and ritual use. Tourism has led to new departures in the use of the symbols on items such as T-shirts and jewellery.

Adinkra symbols have a decorative function but also represent objects that encapsulate evocative messages conveying traditional wisdom, aspects of life, or the environment. There are many symbols with distinct meanings, often linked with proverbs. In the words of philosopher and writer Kwame Anthony Appiah, they were one of the means for "supporting the transmission of a complex and nuanced body of practice and belief".

== History ==
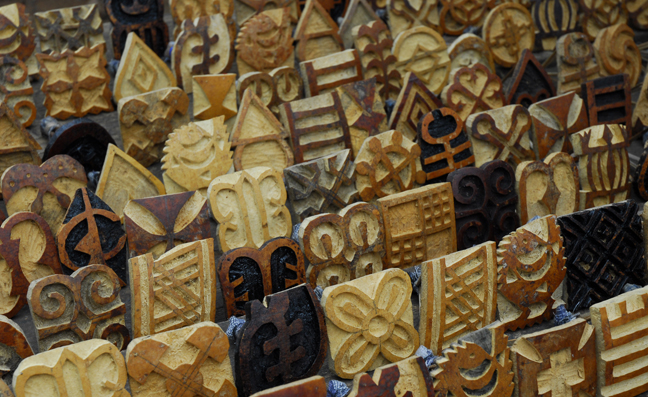
Adinkra calabash stamps

One oral tradition states that Adinkra symbols were originally created by the Bono people of Gyaman. The Gyaman king, Nana Kwadwo Agyemang Adinkra, originally created or designed these symbols, naming it after himself. The Adinkra symbols were largely used on pottery, stools etc. by the people of Gyaman. Adinkra cloth was worn by the king of Gyaman, and its usage spread from Gyaman to Asante and other Akan kingdoms following its defeat. It is said that the guild designers who designed this cloth for the Kings were forced to teach the Asantes the craft. Gyaman king Nana Kwadwo Agyemang Adinkra's first son, Apau, who was said to be well versed in the Adinkra craft, was forced to teach more about Adinkra cloths. Oral accounts have attested to the fact that Adinkra Apau taught the process to a man named Kwaku Dwaku in a town near Kumasi. Over time, all Akan people, including the Fante, Akuapem and Akyem, made Adinkra symbols a major part of their culture.

This oral tradition of a Gyaman origin for Adinkra, however, has been directly disproven, as the Gyaman-Asante war in which tradition recounts the Asante learning Adinkra symbols from Gyaman started in 1818 and the campaign ended in 1819. Two years before this, in 1817, Thomas Bowdich visited Kumasi and had personally seen and written about Adinkra cloth being produced in the Asante capital. He also brought back from Kumasi a physical example of Adinkra cloth, which is still in the British Museum. The cloth being named Adinkra is explained by an informant from Asokwa who related to Kojo Arthur that King Adinkra's body was found in a pile of dead people and when it was retrieved, his body was found to be covered in Ntiamu Ntoma (stamped cloth). From then on, Ntiamu Ntoma became known as Adinkra cloth. This suggests that the cloth was known before 1818 and became associated with Adinkra after the war. In the Asokwa and Ntonso areas, Adinkra cloth is still referred to as Ntiamu Ntoma.

There are other hypothesis and oral traditions for the origin of Adinkra cloth and its name, such as it originating in Denkyira, though these have not been disproven they all have their respective issues and the exact origin of Adinkra cloth is not something that is clear.

The oldest surviving adinkra cloth was made in 1817. The cloth features 15 stamped symbols, including nsroma (stars), dono ntoasuo (double Dono drums), and diamonds. The patterns were printed using carved calabash stamps and a vegetable-based dye. It has resided in the British Museum since 1818, when it was donated by Thomas E. Bowdich.

The next oldest piece of adinkra textile was sent in 1825 from Elmina Castle to the royal cabinet of curiosities in The Hague, in response to an assignment from Major Friedrich Last, who was appointed temporary Commander of Dutch Gold Coast. He probably had the cloth commissioned for William I of the Netherlands, which would explain why the coat of arms of the Netherlands is in the centre. The other motifs are typical of the older adinkras. It is now on display in the National Museum of Ethnology in Leiden.

== Adinkra cloth ==
In Akan (Twi), the term adinkra refers not to symbols but to a particular type of cloth. Adinkra cloths were traditionally only worn by royalty and spiritual leaders for funerals and other very special occasions. In the past, they were hand-printed on undyed, red, dark brown or black hand-woven natural cotton fabric, depending on the occasion and the wearer's role; nowadays they are frequently mass-produced on brighter coloured fabrics.

The present centre of traditional production of adinkra cloth is Ghana, Ntɔnso, 20 km northwest of Kumasi and in Ivory Coast. Dark Adinkra aduro pigment for the stamping is made there, by soaking, pulverizing, and boiling the inner bark and roots of the badie tree (Bridelia ferruginea) in water over a wood fire. Once the dark colour is released, the mixture is strained, and then boiled for several more hours until it thickens. The stamps are carved out of the bottom of a calabash piece. They measure between five and eight centimetres square. They have a handle on the back, and the stamp itself is slightly curved so that the dye can be put on with a rocking motion.

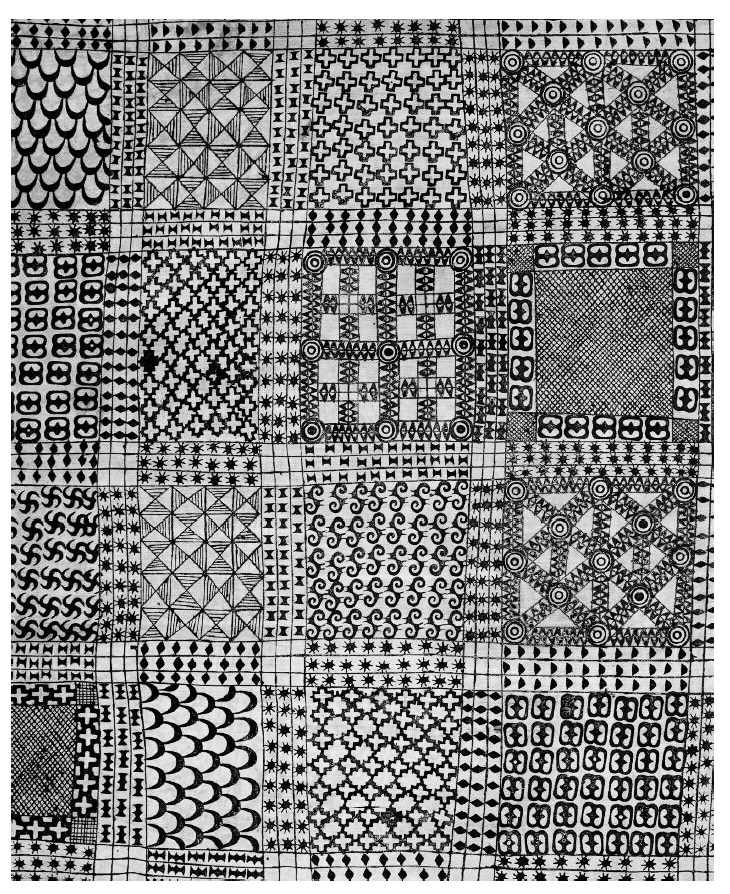
1817 Adinkra mourning cloth

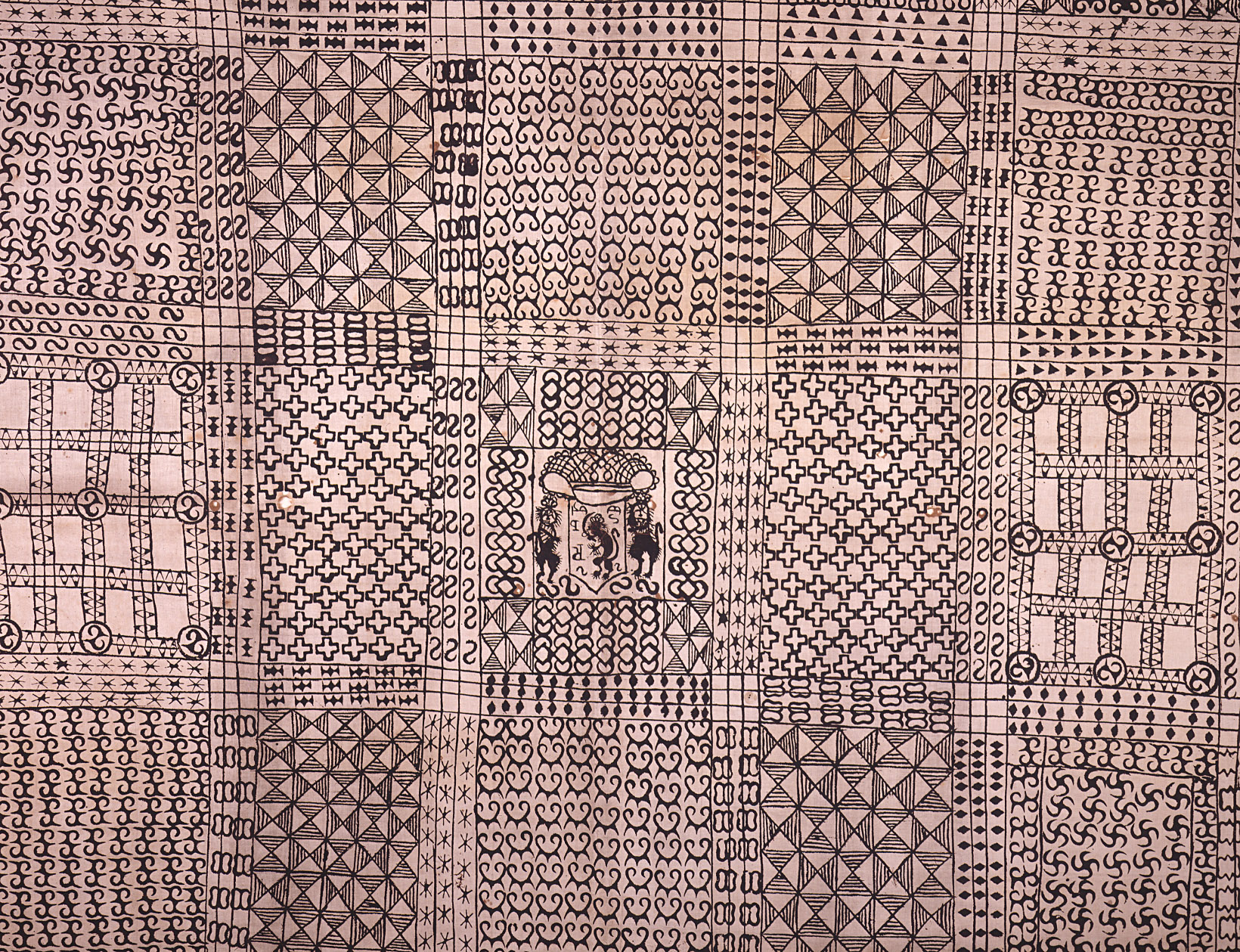
1825 Adinkra cloth

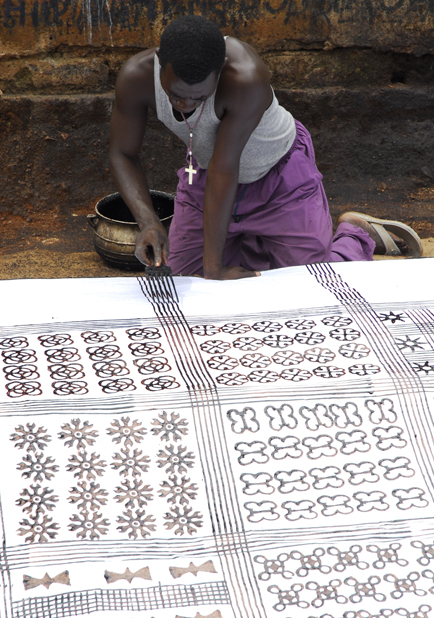
Anthony Boakye uses a comb to mark parallel lines on an adinkra cloth in Ntonso, Ghana.

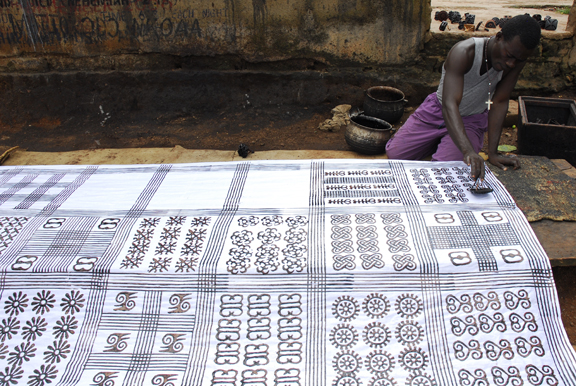
Anthony Boakye prints an adinkra cloth with a calabash stamp in Ntonso, Ghana.

== Sample of symbols listed ==
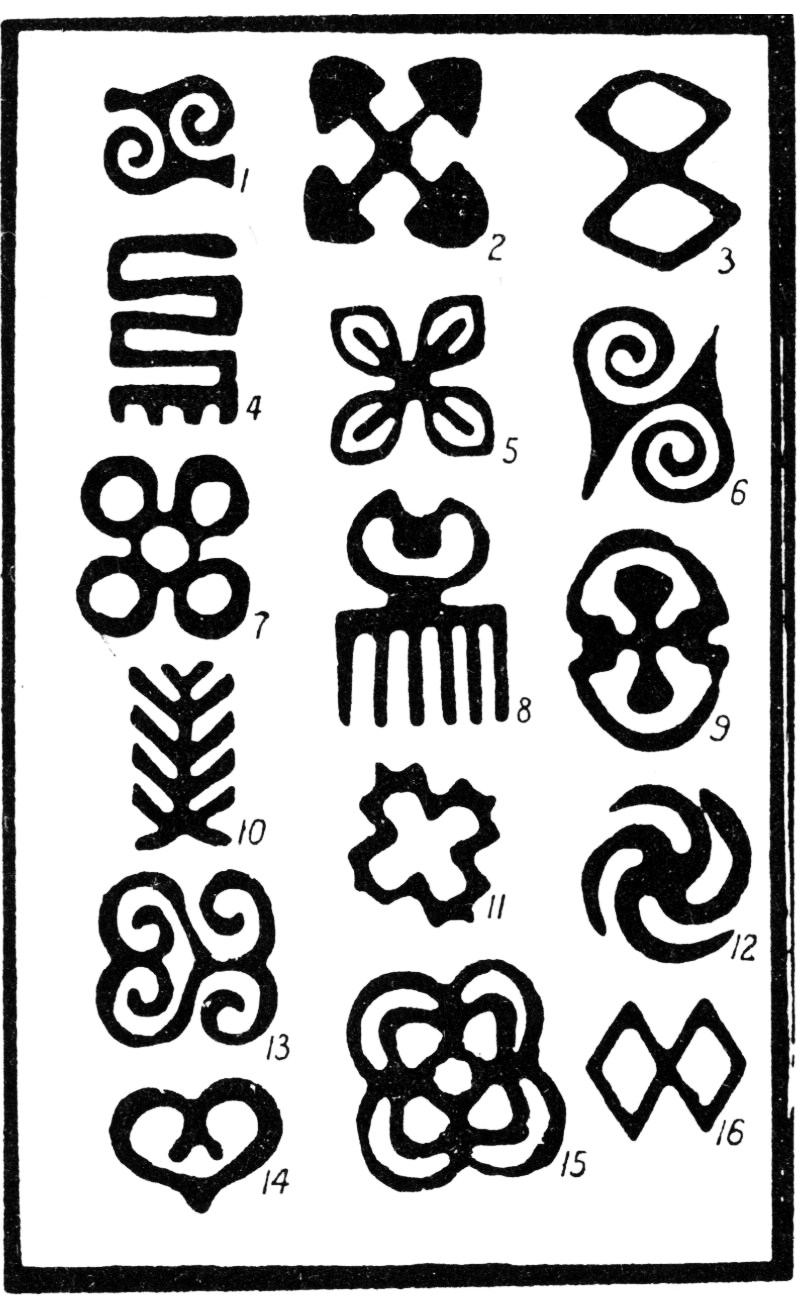
Adinkra symbols recorded by Robert Sutherland Rattray, 1927

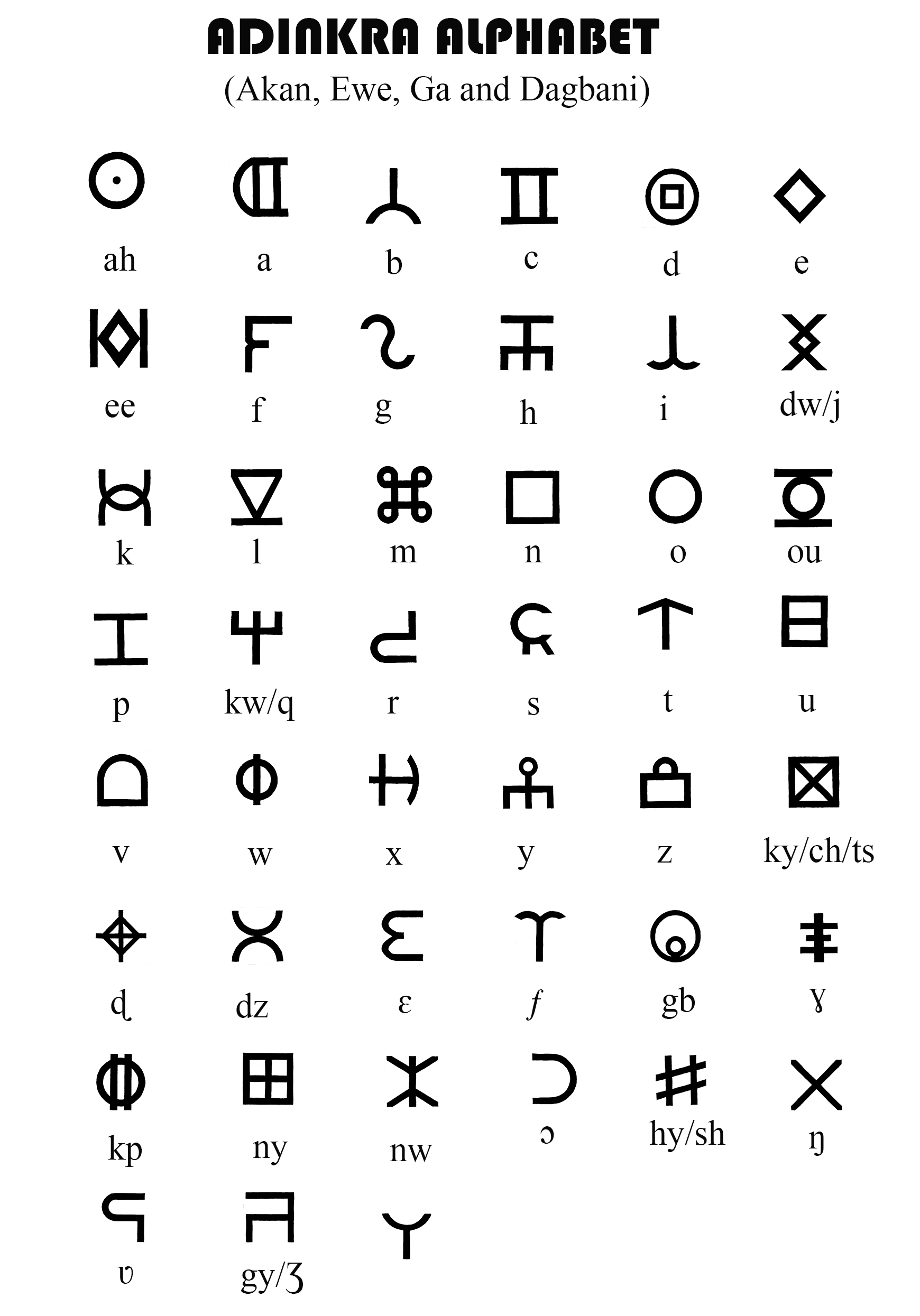
Adinkra alphabet is a phonetic writing system derived from adinkra symbols.

Recorded sample of 53 adinkra symbols and their meanings.

List of symbols and information
Number	Symbol name	Literal meaning	Further details	Related symbols
1	Aban	A two-storied house, a castle	This design was formerly worn by the King of Asante alone.	
4	Adinkira 'hene	The Adinkira king	"Chief" of all these Adinkira designs	
8	Agyindawuru	The agyin tree's gong	The juice of a tree of that name is sometimes squeezed into a gong and is said to make the sound pleasing to the spirits	
	Akam	An edible plant, possibly a yam		
9	Akoben	The war-horn		
12	Akoko nan tia "ba, na nkum 'ba'"	A hen treads upon chickens but does not kill them		
13	Akoma	A heart, sometimes with a cross in the centre		
	[None listed]			No. 13
14	AKOMA NTOSO	The joined hearts		
18	Aya	The fern	The word also means "I am not afraid of you", "I am independent of you", and the wearer may imply this by wearing it	
20	BI NKA BI	No one should bite the other		
23	DAME-DAME	Name of a board game	Symbol of intelligence and ingenuity	
25	Dono	The dono drum		
26	Dono ntoasuo	The double dono drums		
27	Duafe	The wooden comb		
28	Dwenini aben	The ram's horns		
30	Epa	Handcuffs		
34	Fihankra	The circular house		
35	Se die fofoo pe, ne se gyinantwi abo bedie	What the yellow-flowered fofoo plant wants is that the gyinantwi seeds should turn black	An Asante saying. One of the cotton cloth designs bears the same name. The fofoo, the botanical name of which is Bidens pilosa, has a small yellow flower, which, when it drops its petals, turns into a black spiky seed. Said of a jealous person. According to Ayensu (1978), the gyinantwi also refers to Bidens pilosa.	
37	Funtunfunefu Denkyemfunefu	Siamese crocodiles	They share one stomach yet they fight over food	
38	Gyawu Atiko	The back of Gyawu's head	Gyawu was a sub-chief of Bantama who at the Odwira ceremony is said to have had his hair shaved in this fashion	
39	Gye Nyame	"Except God" or "Only God"	Fear none but God	
41	Hye wo nhye	He who would burn you be not burned		
44	Kojo Biaden			
47	Papani amma yenhu Kramo	The (large number of) people who do good prevents us knowing who really are Mohammedans	As adherents of Islam are enjoined to do good works in the community, and increasing numbers of non-Muslims are also doing so, we can no longer use that criterion to distinguish those Muslims living amongst us	
49	Kuntinkantan	Bent and spread out	Nkuntinkantan is used in the sense of "do not boast, do not be arrogant"	
50	Obohemaa	Queen of stones	Copied from Europeans adopted by Akans to define Gold Coast's diamond mining, which began in 1919	
Non listed	Kwatakye atiko	At the back of Kwatakye's head	Kwatakye was a war captain of one of the Asante kings; at the Odwira ceremony he is said to have cut his hair after this fashion	
Non listed	Mmrafo ani ase	The keloids on a Hausa man		
55	Mmra Krado	The Hausa man's lock		
56	Musuyidie	Something to remove evil	A cloth with this design stamped upon it lay beside the sleeping couch of the King of Asante, and every morning when he rose he placed his left foot upon it three times	
58	Mpuannum	Five tufts (of hair)		
62	Nkonsonkonson	Links of a chain		
63	Nkotimsefuopua		Certain attendants on the Queen Mother who dressed their hair in this fashion. Variation of a swastika.	
64	Nkuruma kese	Dried okras		
66	Nkyimkyim	The twisted pattern		
68	Nsaa		From a design of this name found on nsa cloths	
69	Nsirewa	Cowries		
70	Nsoroma / Nsoromma	A child of the Sky / Child of the Heavens	Referring to the saying: Oba Nyankon soroma te Nyame so na onte ne ho so, "Like the star, the child of the Supreme Being, I rest with God and do not depend upon myself." / the pattern was on the King of Asante's pillow	
71	Ma te; Masie	I have heard (what you have said); I have hidden it	This extols the virtue of being able to keep a confidence	
Non listed	Nyame, biribi wo soro, ma no me ka me nsa	O God, everything which is above, permit my hand to touch it	The pattern was stamped on paper and hung above the lintel of a door in the palace. The King of Asante used to touch lintel, then his forehead, then his breast, repeating these words three times	
74	Nyame dua	An altar to the Sky God		
76	Nyame nwu na ma wu	May Nyame die before I die		
Non listed	Obi nka obie	I offend no one without a cause		
84	Ohene niwa	(In) the king's little eyes	To be in the king's favour	
85	Ohen' tuo	The king's gun		
86	Kodie mmowerewa	The eagle's talons		
92	Owo Foro Adobe	The symbol of heroic deeds and accomplishing the impossible, but being quiet about it		
93	Pa gya	To strike fire (with a flint)		
96	Sankofa	Turn back and fetch it		
97	Sankofa	Turn back and fetch it		
98	Sepow	A knife thrust through the cheeks of a man	The man is about to be executed to prevent his invoking of a curse on the king	
