= Akan goldweights =

Ghanaian weight made of brass used by the Akans

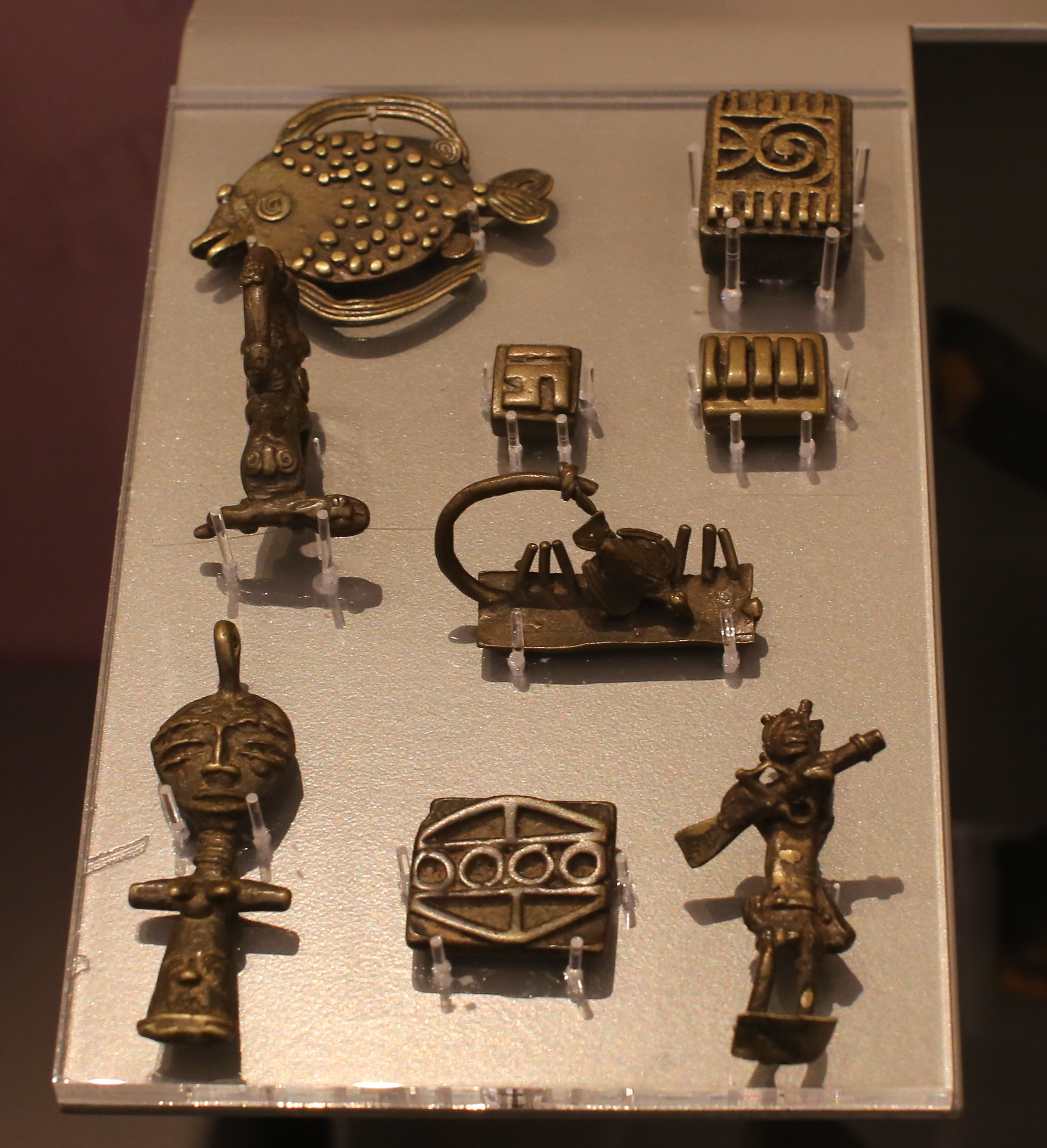
A selection of Ashanti goldweights

Akan goldweights (locally known as mrammou or abrammuo) are weights made of brass used as a measuring system by the Akan people of West Africa, particularly for secure and fair-trade arrangements with one another. The status of a man increased significantly if he owned a complete set of weights. Complete small sets of weights were gifts to newly wedded men. This insured that he would be able to enter the merchant trade respectably and successfully.

Beyond their practical application, the weights are miniature representations of West African culture items such as adinkra symbols, plants, animals and people.

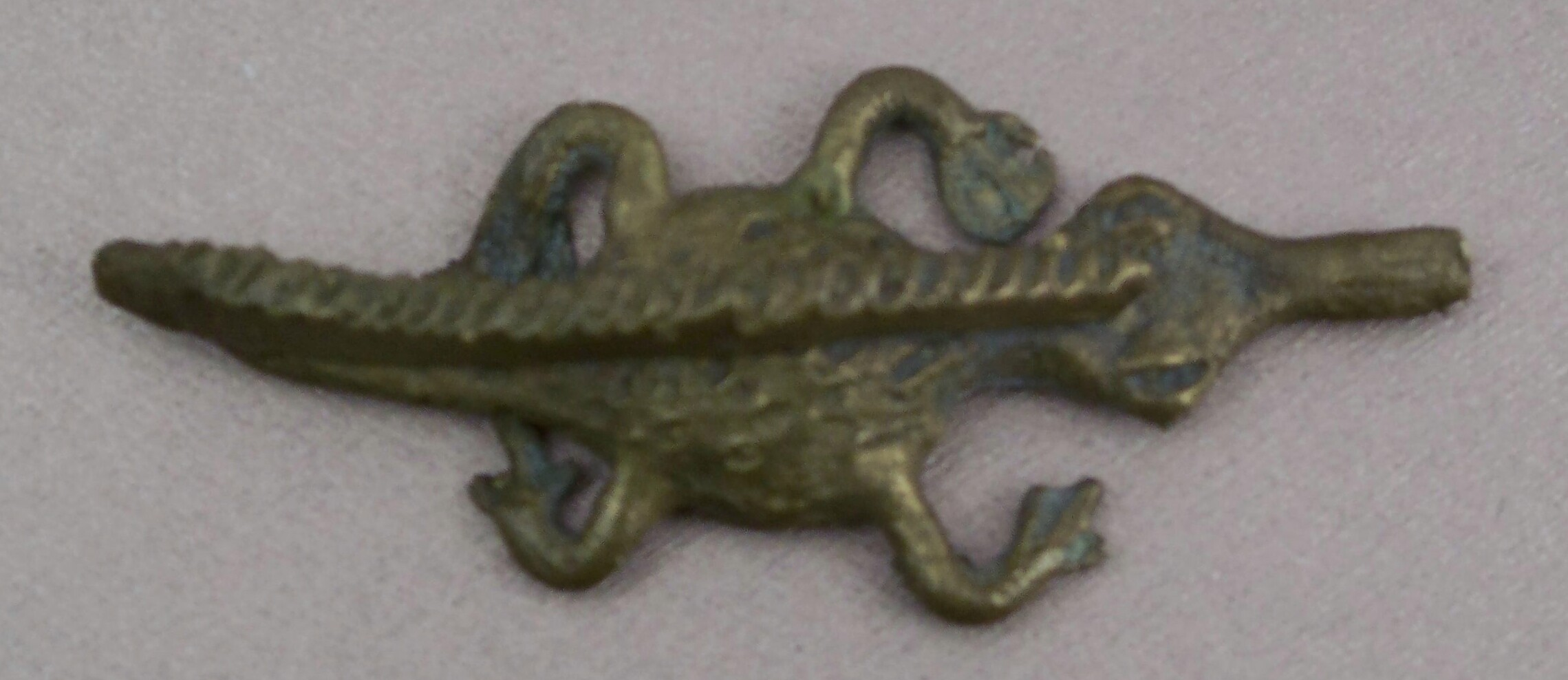
Crocodile goldweight

Geometric goldweight

Figurative goldweight

== Dating the weights ==
Stylistic studies of goldweights can provide relative dates into the two broad Early and Late periods. The Early period is thought to have been from about 1400–1720 AD, with some overlap with the Late period, 1700-1900 AD. There is a distinct difference between the Early and Late periods. Geometric weights are the oldest forms, dating from 1400 AD onwards while figurative weights, those made in the image of people, animals, building etc., first appear around 1600 AD. It's supposed that throughout the early and late periods from 1400-1900 AD there were around 4 million goldweights cast by the Ashanti and Baule ethnic groups of West Africa.

Radiocarbon dating, a standard and accurate method in many disciplines, cannot be used to date the weights, as it is an inorganic material. The base components of inorganic materials, such as metals, formed long before the manufacturing of the artifact. The copper and zinc used to make the alloy are vastly older than the artifact itself. Studies on the quality or origins of the base metals in brass are not very useful due to the broad distribution and recycling of the material.

Studying the weight's cultural background or provenance is an accurate method of dating the weights. Historical records accompanying the weight describing the people to whom it belonged to, as well as a comparative study of the weights and oral and artistic traditions of neighbouring communities should be part of studying the background and provenance of the weights.

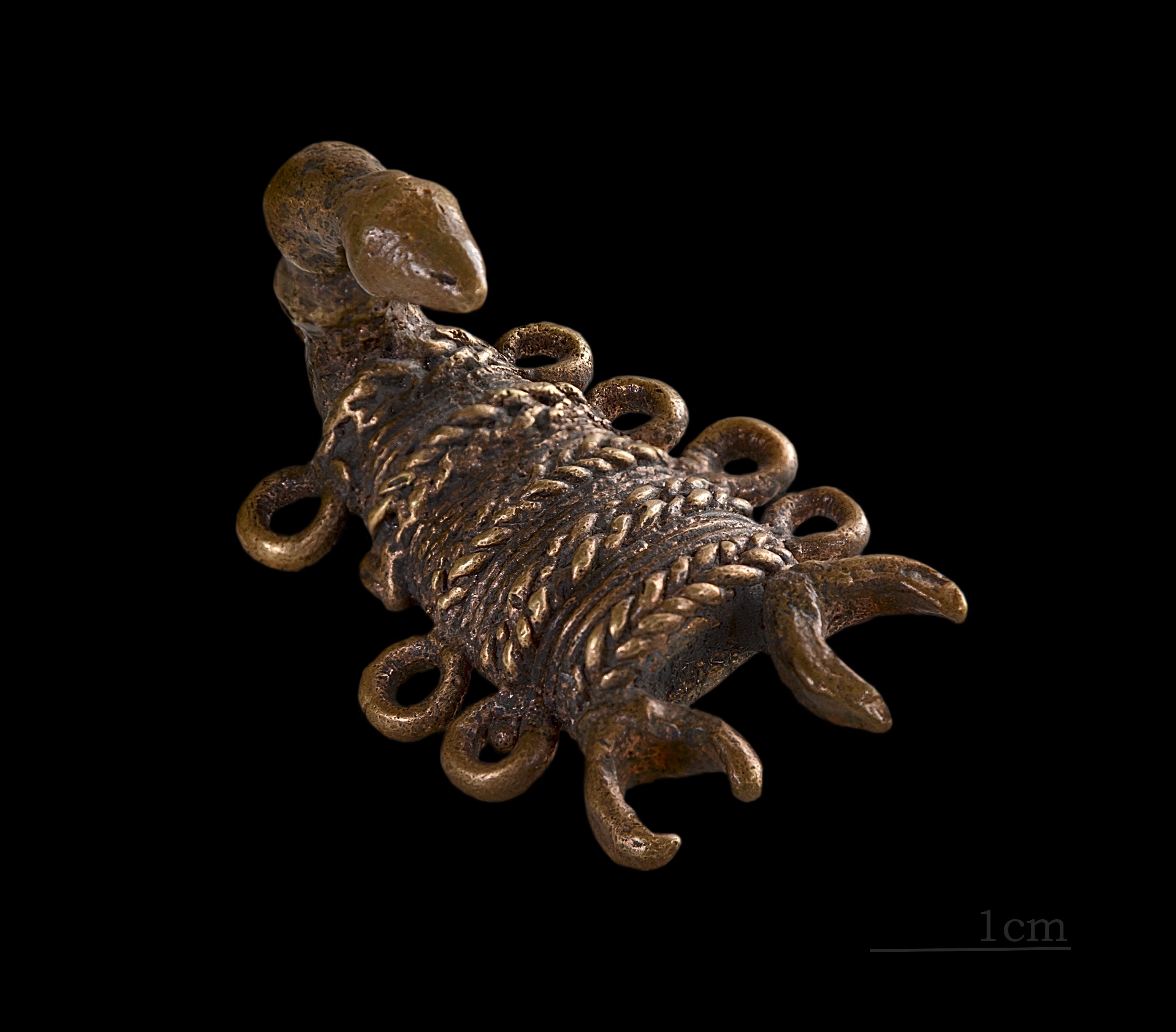
Scorpion goldweight Late period 19th century

Early Period 1400 A.D.-1700 A.D. Geometric style 1/2 inch long

== Meanings behind the weights ==
Goldweight with a Geometric Design, Asante, Ghana, 18th/19th century. Art Institute of Chicago.

Scholars use the weights, and the oral traditions behind the weights, to understand aspects of Akan culture that otherwise may have been lost. The weights represent stories, riddles, and codes of conduct that helped guide Akan peoples in the ways they lived their lives. Central to Akan culture is the concern for equality and justice; it is rich in oral histories on this subject. Many weights symbolize significant and well-known stories. The weights were part of the Akan's cultural reinforcement, expressing personal behaviour codes, beliefs, and values in a medium that was assembled by many people.

These goldweights and their meanings almost all solely emanate from Akan systems and ways of thinking. While it's inevitable that different cultures influence each other, the names, writing and philosophy ingrained into these weights are all ideas native to the Akan people and hardly found in other West African societies.

Anthony Appiah describes how his mother, who collected goldweights, was visited by Muslim Hausa traders from the north. The goldweights they brought were "sold by people who had no use for them any more, now that paper and coin had replaced gold-dust as currency. And as she collected them, she heard more and more of the folklore that went with them; the proverbs that every figurative gold-weight elicited; the folk-tales, Ananseasem, that the proverbs evoked." Appiah also heard these Ananseasem, Anansi stories, from his father, and writes: "Between his stories and the cultural messages that came with the gold-weights, we gathered the sort of sense of a cultural tradition that comes from growing up in it. For us it was not Asante tradition but the webwork of our lives."

There are a number of parallels between Akan goldweights and the seals used in Harappa. Both artifacts stabilized and secured regional and local trade between peoples, while they took on further meaning beyond their practical uses.

Many animals native to the region and shapes of all kind were depicted in these goldweights. However of interesting note and significant lack of prominence in Akan goldweights is the depiction of a lion. While the lion and the leopard are both symbols of strength and courage in Akan art and culture, the leopard stands out as the prominent motif. The Ashanti people of the Akan region are primarily located in forested areas where leopards thrive. Symbolic lions tend to be a coat of arms associated with European trading companies in West Africa. The heraldic lion was not considered to be king of the jungle by the Ashanti, but rather the leopard.

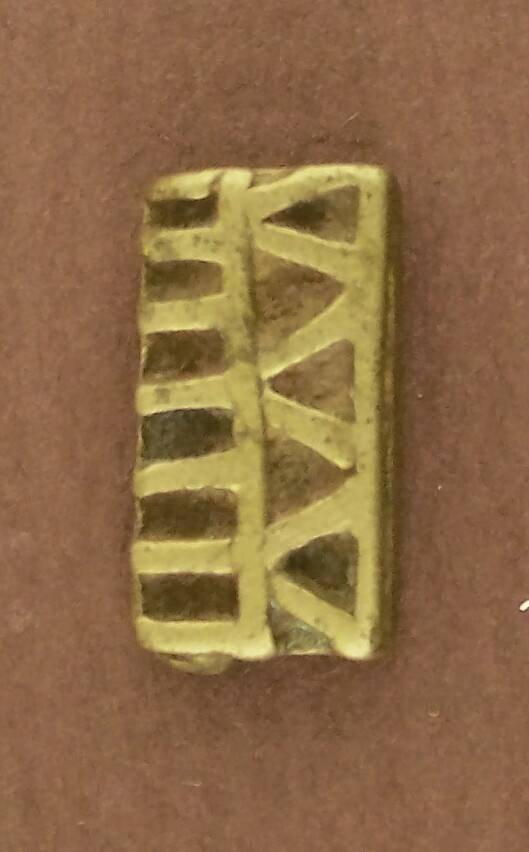
Early period 1400 A.D.-1700 A.D., geometric style, 1/4 inch long

Late period 1700 A.D. -1900 A.D. Figurative style, 2.5 inches high

Collection of the Museum of Archaeology & Ethnography, Simon Fraser University, Canada

Shields are symbols of bravery, stamina, or a glorious deed, though not necessarily in battle. Double-edged swords symbolize a joint rule between female and male, rather than implying violence or rule with fear. The naming of the weights is incredibly complex, as a complete list of Akan weights had more than sixty values, and each set had a local name that varied regionally. There are, from studies done by Garrard, twelve weight-name lists from Ghana and the Ivory Coast.

== Collections of weights ==
Some estimate that there are 3 million goldweights in existence. Simon Fraser University has a small collection, consisting mostly of geometric style weights, with a number of human figurative weights. Both types are pictured here and come from the SFU Museum of Archaeology and Ethnography. Many of the largest museums of in the US and Europe have sizable collections of goldweights. The National Museum of Ghana, the Musée des Civilisations de Côte d'Ivoire in Abidjan, Derby Museum and smaller museums in Mali all have collections of weights with a range of dates. Private collections have amassed a wide range of weights as well.

== Manufacture of the weights ==
In the past, each weight was meticulously carved, then cast using the ancient technique of lost wax. As the Akan culture moved away from using gold as the basis of their economy, the weights lost their cultural day-to-day use and some of their significance. Their popularity with tourists has created a market that the locals fill with mass-produced weights. These modern reproductions of the weights have become a tourist favorite. Rather than the simple but artistic facial features of the anthropomorphic weights or the clean, smooth lines of the geomorphic weights, modern weights are unrefined and look mass-produced. The strong oral tradition of the Akan is not included in the creation of the weights; however, this does not seem to lessen their popularity.

The skill involved in casting weights was enormous; as most weights were less than 2½ ounces and their exact mass was meticulously measured. They were a standard of measure to be used in trade, and had to be accurate. The goldsmith, or adwumfo, would make adjustments if the casting weighed too much or too little. Even the most beautiful, figurative weights had limbs and horns removed, or edges filed down until it met the closest weight equivalent. Weights that were not heavy enough would have small lead rings or glass beads attached to bring up the weight to the desired standard. There are far more weights without modifications than not, speaking to the talent of the goldsmiths. Most weights were within 3% of their theoretical value; this variance is similar to those of European nest weights from the same time.

Early weights display bold, but simple, artistic designs. Later weights developed into beautiful works of art with fine details. However, by the 1890s (Late Period) the quality of both design and material was very poor, and the abandonment of the weights quickly followed.

Tim Garrard (April 28, 1943 – May 17, 2007) studied the Akan gold culture. His research was centered on goldweights and their cultural significances and purposes. He was also interested in the gold trade, the creation of the weight measurements, and how Akan trade networks operated with other networks. His works and those that use his work as a base are very informative about broader Akan culture.

The weights pictured here are part of the collection at the SFU museum. Donated to the museum in the late 1970s, they are part of a wide collection of African cultural pieces.

== See also ==
- Birimian
- Economy of the Ashanti Empire
- Geology of Ghana
