= Chess set =

Board and pieces for playing the game of chess

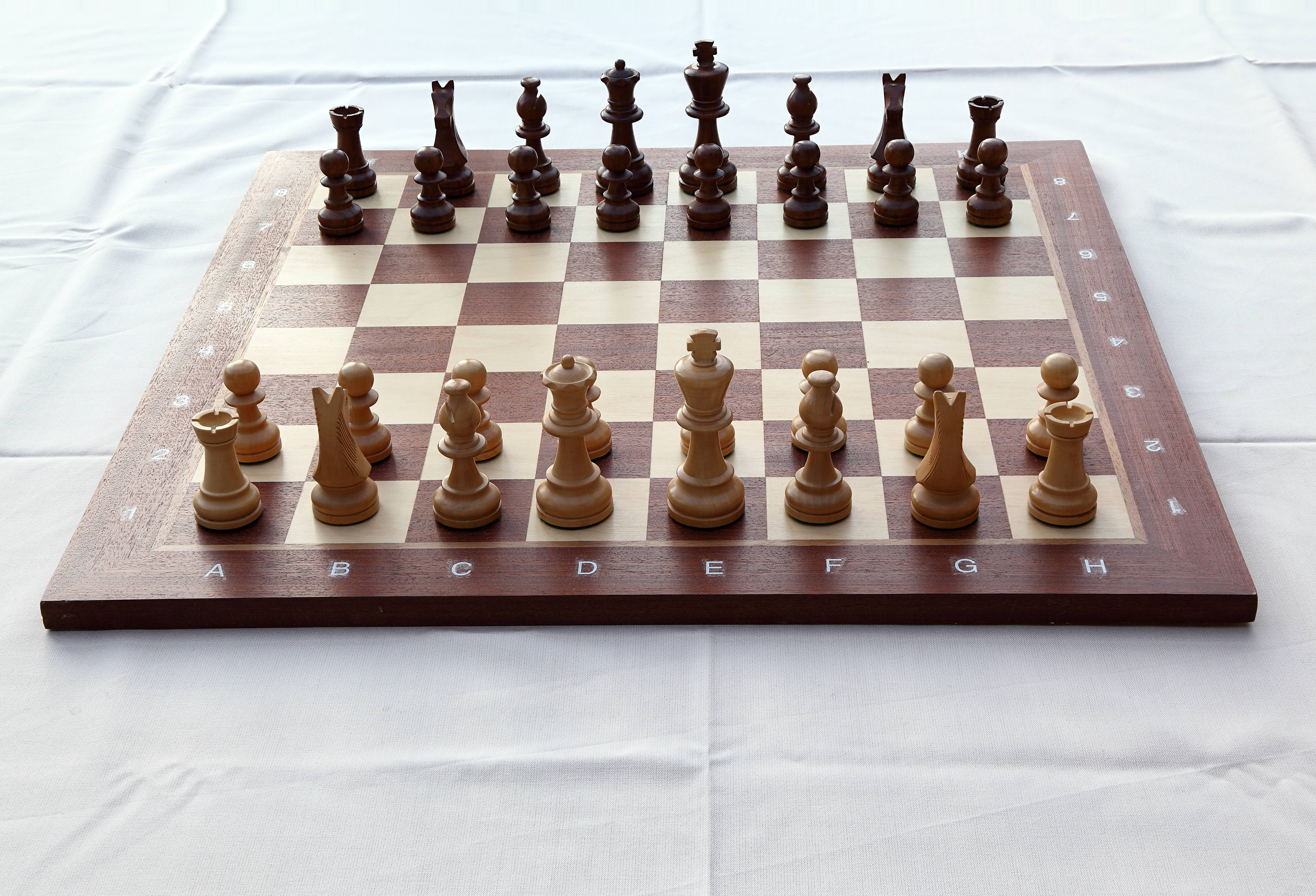
Staunton chess pieces arrayed on a chess board in their starting positions.

A chess set consists of a chessboard and (nominally) 'white' and 'black' chess pieces for playing chess. There are sixteen pieces of each color: one king, one queen, two rooks, two bishops, two knights, and eight pawns. Extra pieces may be provided for use in pawn promotion, most commonly one extra queen per color. Chess boxes, chess clocks, and chess tables are common pieces of equipment used with chess sets. Chess sets are made in a wide variety of styles, sometimes for ornamental rather than practical purposes. For tournament play, the Staunton chess set is preferred and, in some cases, required.

Human chess uses people (often in costumes) as the pieces. Blindfold chess may be played without any set at all.

== Middle Ages sets ==
The oldest chess sets adopted abstract shapes following the Muslim traditional sets of the shatranj game. These pieces evolved with time, as more details were added, to a figurative design.

In the abstract Islamic designs, both the king and the queen resemble a throne, with the queen being smaller; the bishop displays two small protuberances, representing elephant tusks; the knight presents a single protuberance, representing the head of a horse; the rook has a 'V'-shaped cut on the top; and the pawn usually has a simple shape.

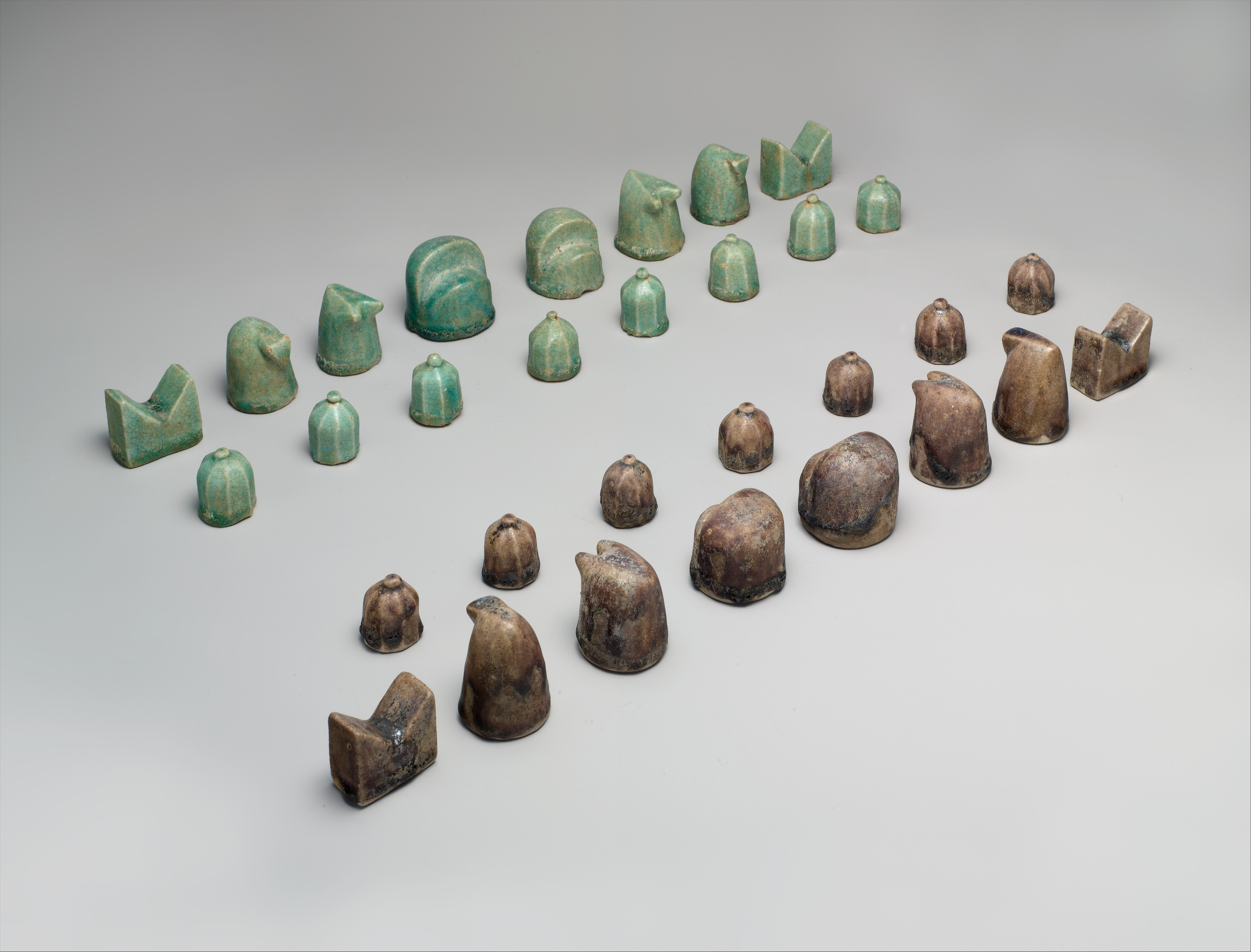
12th century abstract Islamic pieces from Nishapur, Iran

Notable archaeological chess sets include the following:

- The San Genadio chess pieces, a 9th century set of two rooks, a knight and a bishop, in abstract form. The pieces, made of deer antler, were found in Peñalba de Santiago, in Astorga, Spain. In olden times mistaken by relics of San Genadio (hence the name), they are probably the oldest European chess pieces.
- The Charlemagne chessmen, an 11th century set probably manufactured in Salerno, Italy. The set, carved from elephant ivory, was originally inventoried with a total of 30 pieces, but today only 16 are preserved in Saint Denis : 2 kings, 2 queens, 4 knights, 4 elephants, 3 chariots and a foot soldier.
- The Lewis chessmen, a collection of 79 assorted 12th century chess pieces and other game pieces – mostly carved from walrus ivory. Discovered in 1831 on the Isle of Lewis, in the Outer Hebrides, Scotland.

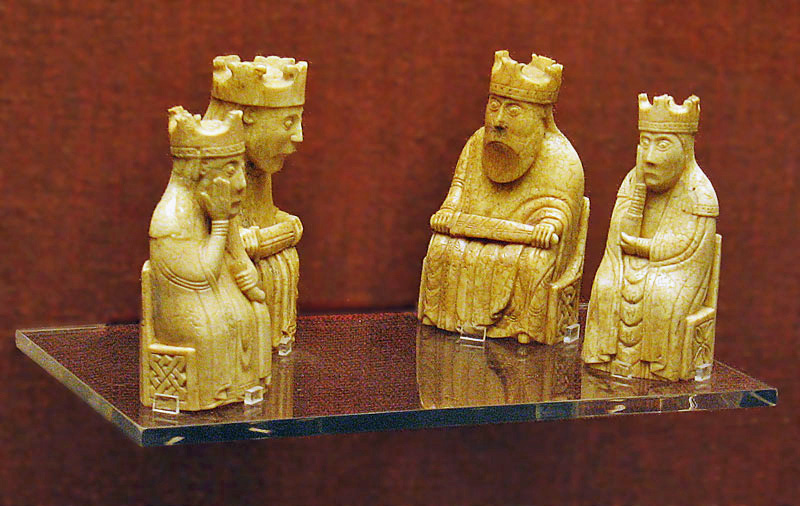
Lewis chessmen in the British Museum

- The Clonard chess piece, an historic playing piece depicting a queen seated on a throne, dated from the late 12th century. It was found in a bog in Clonard, Co. Meath, Ireland, some time before 1817.

== Table sets ==
The variety of designs available is broad, from small cosmetic changes to highly abstract representations, to themed designs such as those that emulate the drawings from the works of Lewis Carroll, or modern treatments such as Star Trek or The Simpsons. Themed designs are generally intended for display purposes rather than actual play. Some works of art are designs of chess sets, such as the modernist chess set by chess enthusiast and dadaist Man Ray, that is on display in the Museum of Modern Art in New York City.

Chess pieces used for play are usually figurines that are taller than they are wide. For example, a set of pieces designed for a chessboard with 2.25 inches (57 mm) squares typically have a king around 3.75 inches (95 mm) tall. Chess sets are available in a variety of designs, the most familiar being the Staunton design, named after Howard Staunton, a popular 19th century English chess player and essayist, and designed by Nathaniel Cooke. The first Staunton style sets were made in 1849 by Jaques of London (also known as John Jaques of London and Jaques and Son of London)

Wooden ‘white’ chess pieces are normally made of a light-colored wood, boxwood, or sometimes maple. Wooden ‘black’ pieces are made of a dark wood such as rosewood, ebony, red sandalwood, African padauk wood, (Note: African padauk (Pterocarpus santalinus) is similar to red sandalwood and is often marketed as "bud rosewood" or "blood red rosewood".) or walnut. Sometimes they are made of boxwood and stained or painted black, brown, or red. The knights in wooden sets are usually hand-carved, accounting for half the cost of the set. Plastic ‘white’ pieces are made of white, off-white, or tan plastic, and plastic ‘black’ pieces are made of red, dark brown, or black plastic. Sometimes other materials are used, such as bone, ivory, onyx, soapstone, or a composite material.

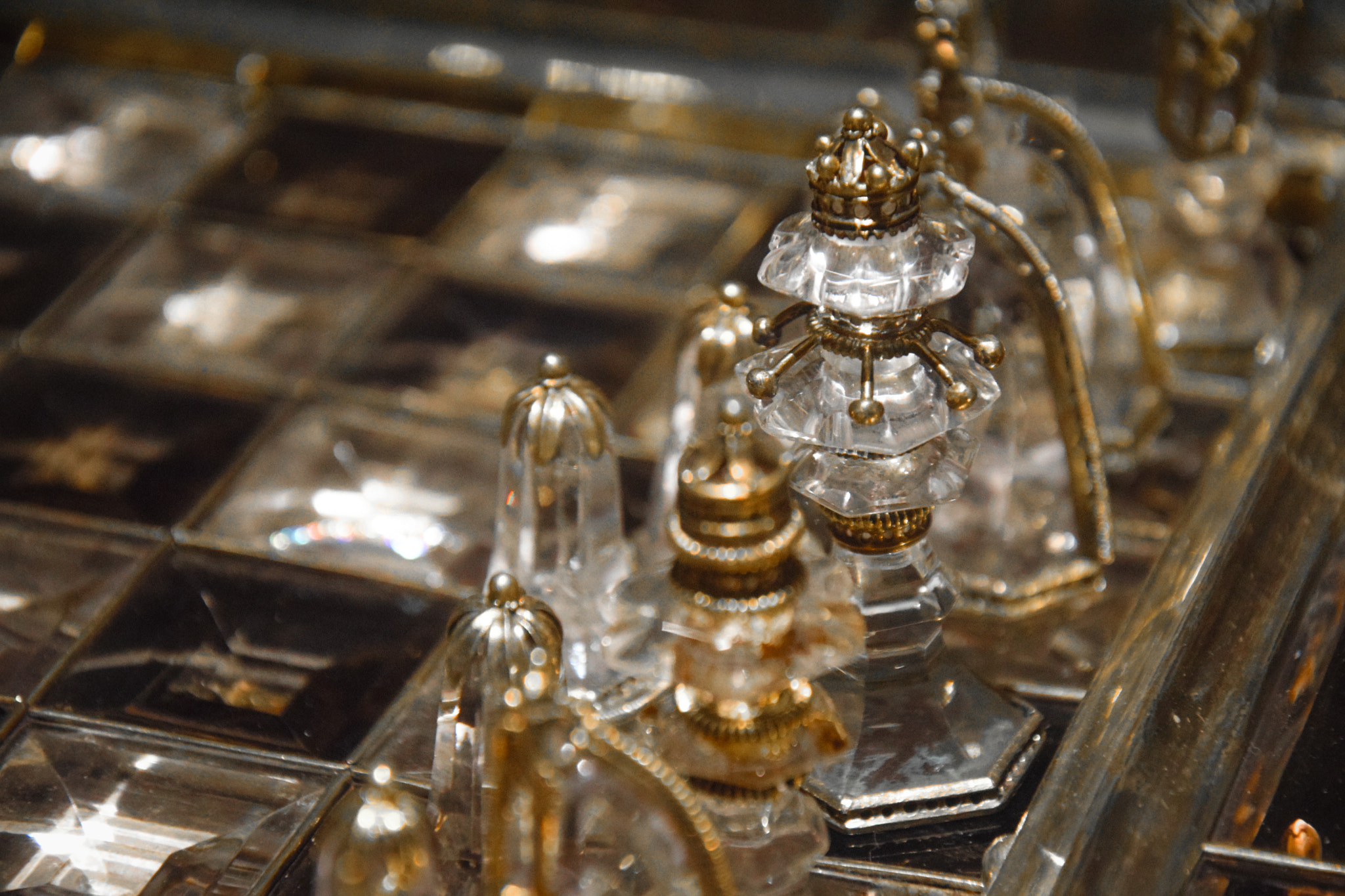
15th century Saint Louis chess set, made of crystal

For actual play, pieces of the Staunton chess set design are standard. The height of the king should be between 3.35 to 4.13 inches (85 to 105 mm). United States Chess Federation rules call for a king height between 3.375 to 4.5 inches (85.7 to 114.3 mm). A height of about 3.75 to 4 inches (95 to 102 mm) is preferred by most players. The diameter of the king should be 40–50% of its height. The size of the other pieces should be in proportion to the king. The pieces should be well balanced such that their center of gravity is closer to the board. This is done by adding weights such as iron studs or lead blocks at the bottom and felted. It makes the pieces bottom-heavy and keeps them from toppling easily (a well-weighted piece should come upright even if tilted 60 degrees off vertical axis). This helps in blitz games, as the speed of movement doesn't offer enough time for dropping the pieces precisely onto the intended squares. The length of each side of the squares on the chessboard should be about 1.25–1.3 times the diameter of the base of the king, or 2 to 2.5 inches (51 to 64 mm). Squares of about 2.25 inches (57 mm) are normally well suited for pieces with the kings in the preferred size range. (Note: These criteria are from the United States Chess Federation's Official Rules of Chess, which is based on the Fédération Internationale des Échecs rules.)

The grandmaster Larry Evans offered this advice on buying a set:

"Make sure the one you buy is easy on the eye, felt-based, and heavy (weighted). The men should be constructed so they don't come apart. ... The regulation board used by the U.S. Chess Federation is green and buff – never red and black. However, there are several good inlaid wood boards on the market. ... Avoid cheap equipment: Chess offers a lifetime of enjoyment for just a few dollars well spent at the outset."

The most expensive chess set is the ‘Jewel Royale’ which was made in 2005 by the British jewelry company Boodles, made of solid gold and platinum, with nearly 1 000 rubies, diamonds, and sapphires; it is valued at $9.8 million.

== Pocket and travel sets ==
Some small magnetic sets, designed to be compact and / or for travel, have pieces more like those used in shogi and xiangqi, with each piece similarly being on a colored flat disc, with a symbol printed on it to identify its type. Older-style travel sets are small pegboards, with miniature pegged pieces or variously shaped pegs for the pieces. Some travel sets' boards have padded, domed lids to help keep the pieces from being knocked out of position when carried.

== Chess boxes ==
A container for holding chess pieces is known as a chess box. Most commonly made of wood, a chess box can be constructed of any material. The internal box configuration can be individual slots for each chess piece, one divider to separate the white and black pieces or no divider with the chess pieces mixed together. The chess box is typically rectangular but can be done in a variety a shapes including a coffer top, sliding drawers or integrated into the chessboard itself.

== Computer images ==
On computers, chess pieces are often 2‑D symbols displayed on a 2‑D grid, similar to graphics in magazines, newspapers, and books. Some more elaborate programs have 3‑D graphics engines that render the chess pieces to resemble a selection of traditional designs.

Unicode assigns separate character codes for white and black symbols for chess pieces.

== Gallery ==
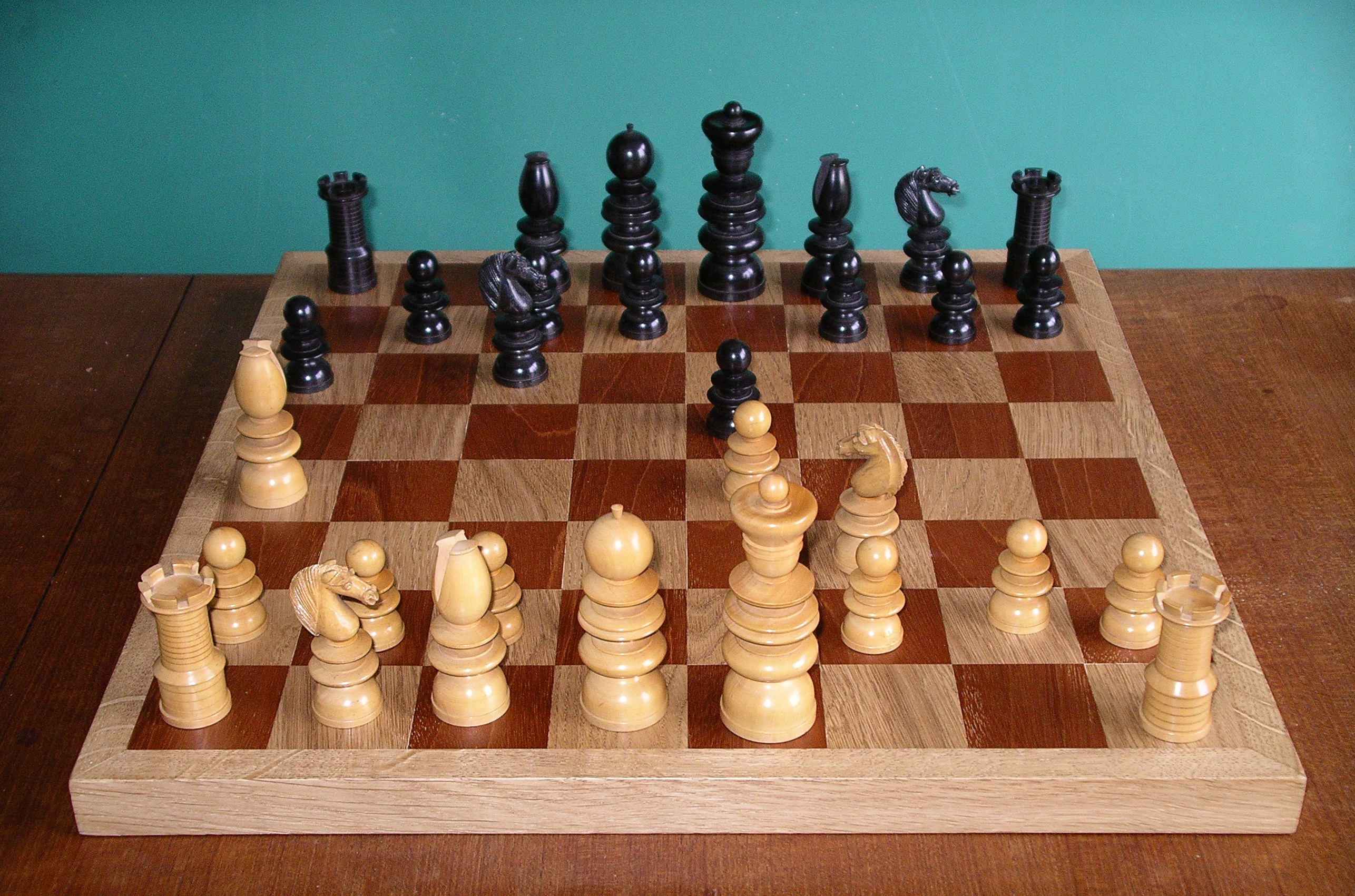
St. George style set from England

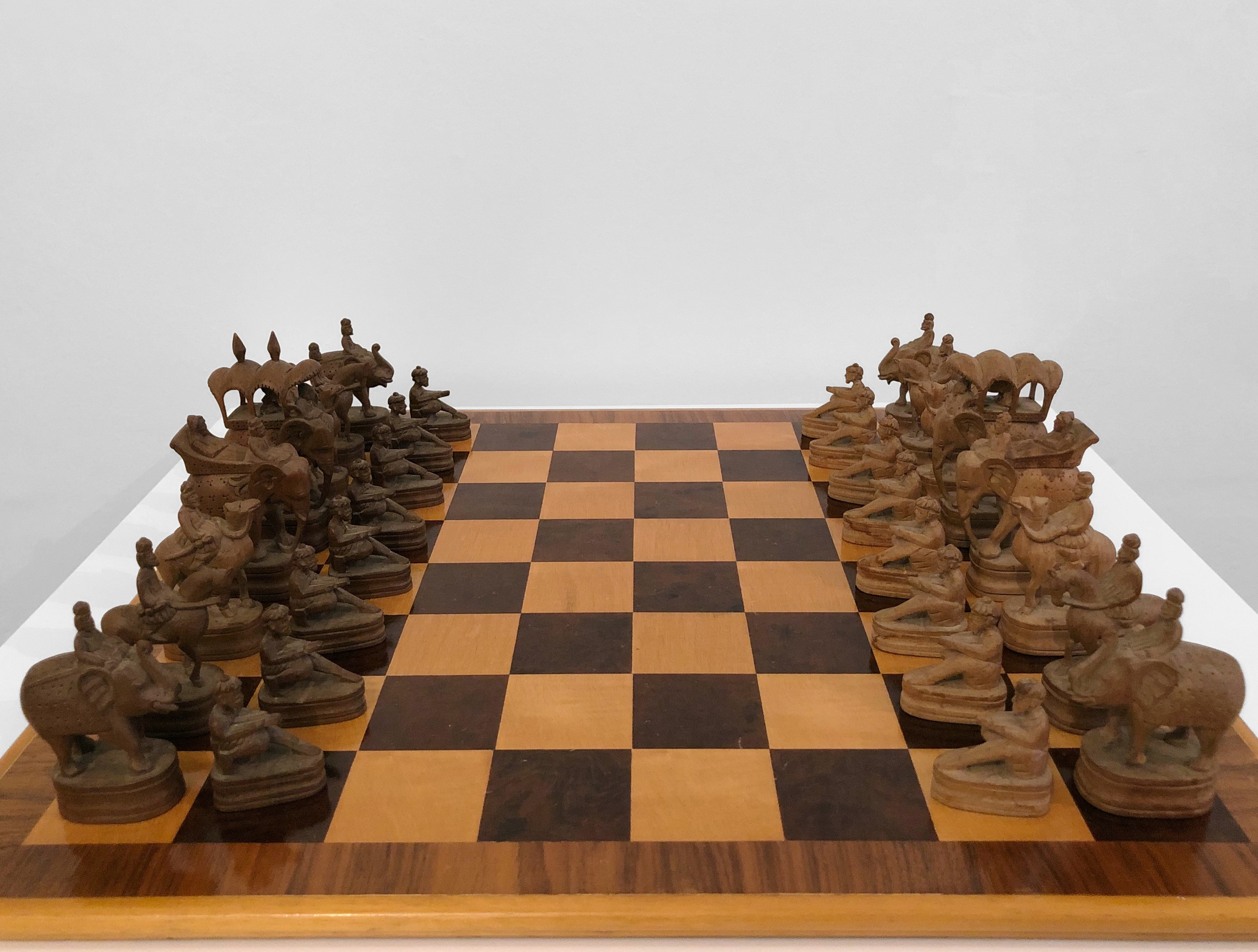
Antique figurine chess set from India

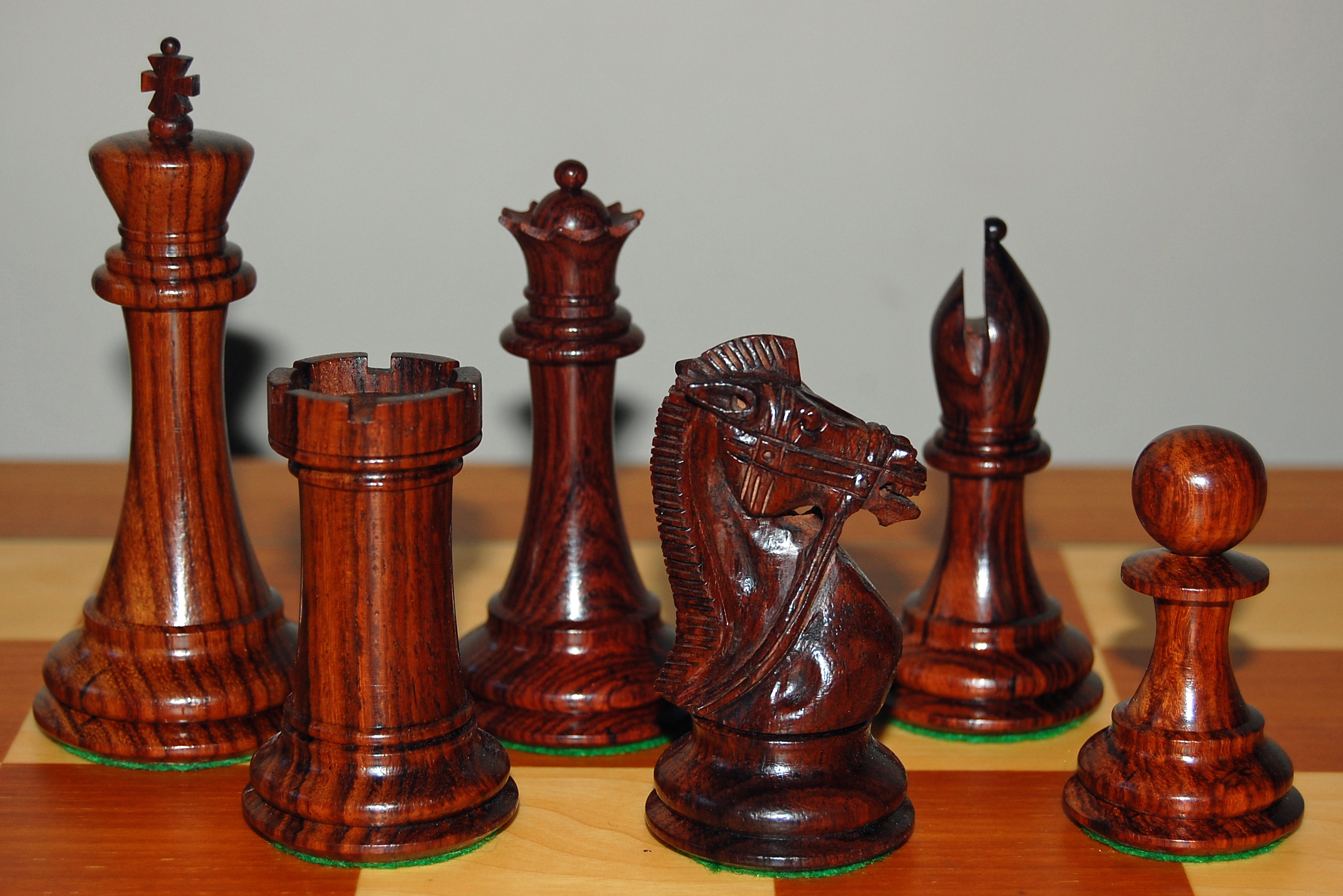
Staunton pieces made of rosewood

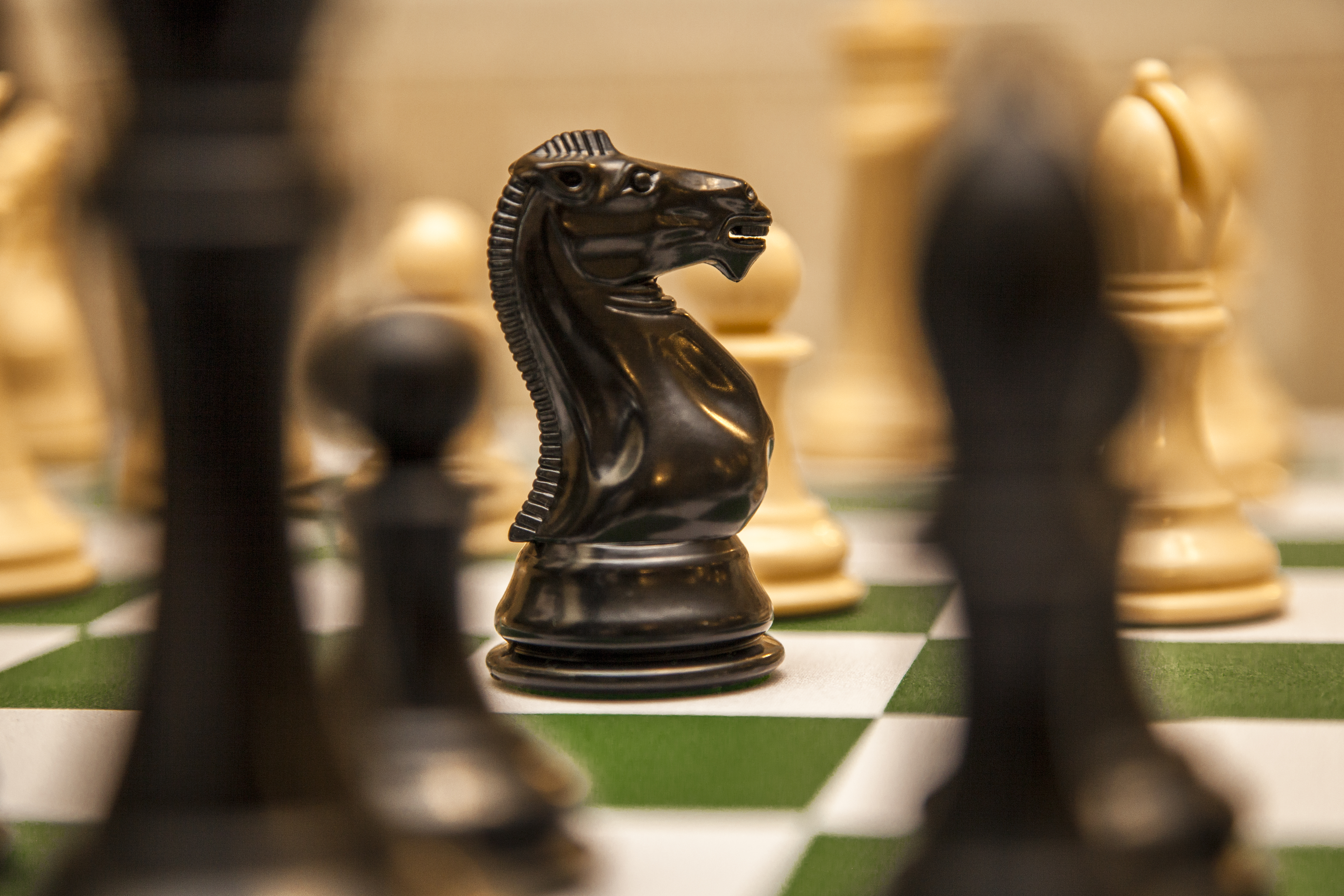
Staunton pieces made of plastic

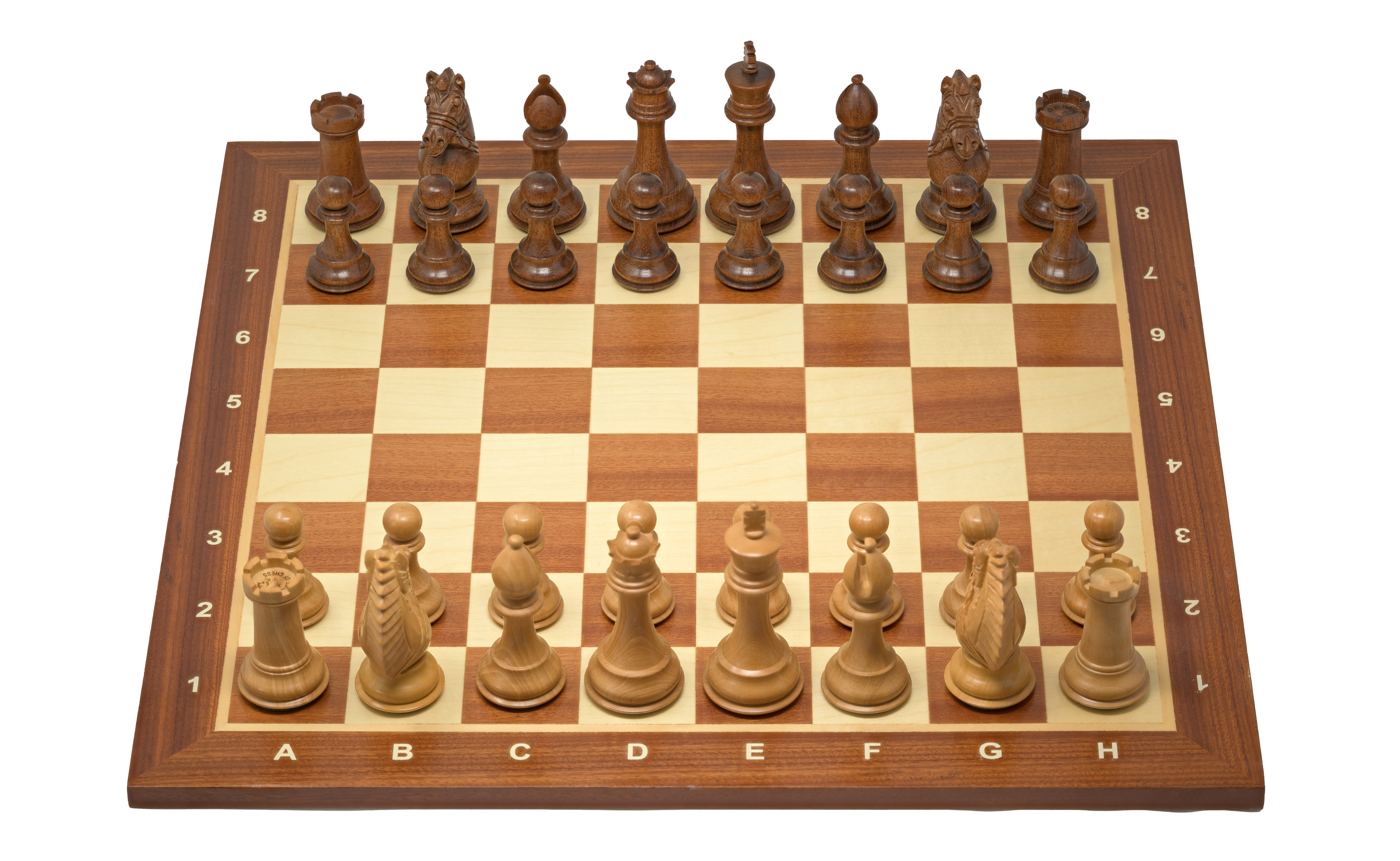
Staunton chess pieces arrayed on a chess board

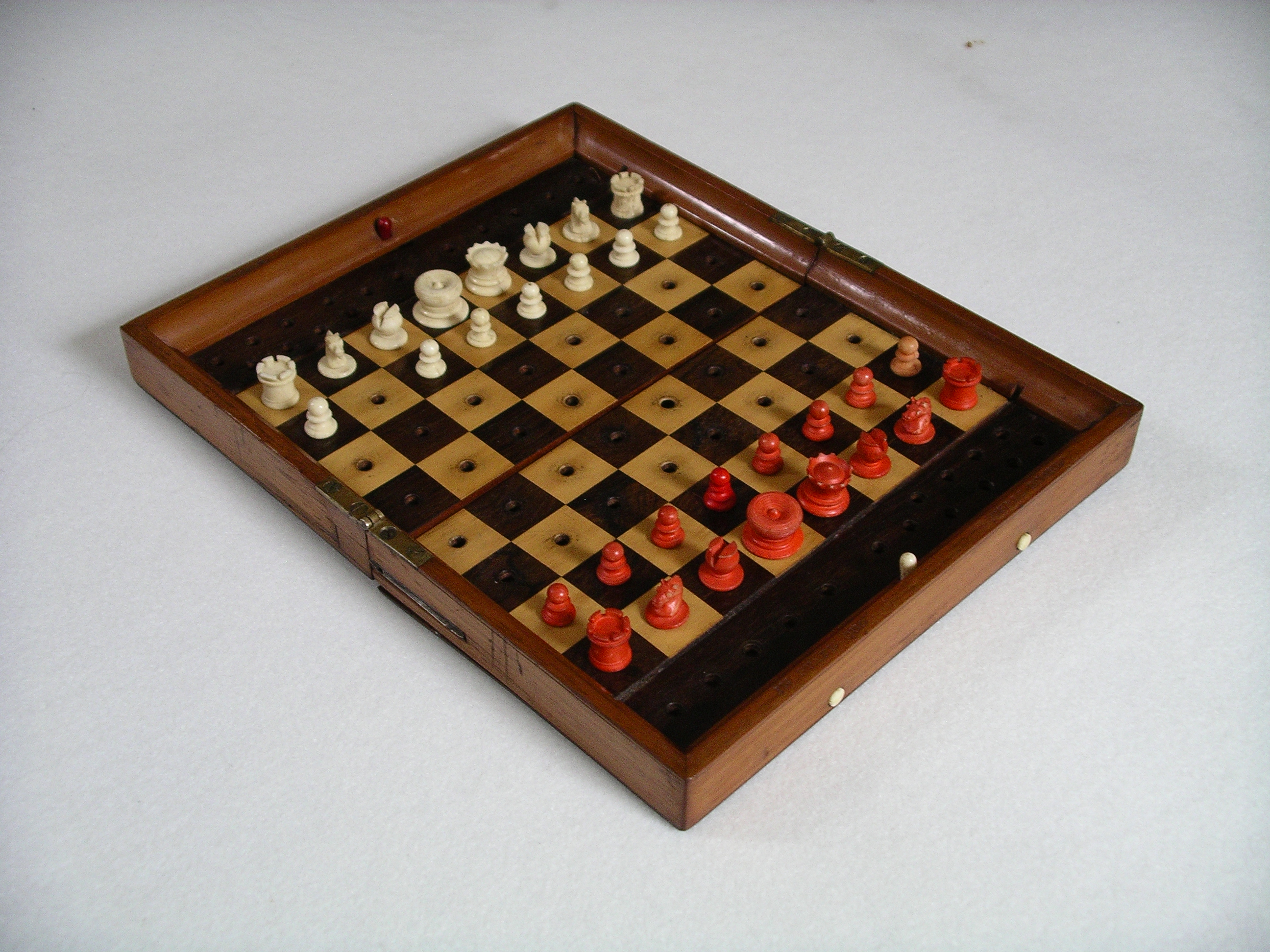
Antique Jaques of London portable chess set

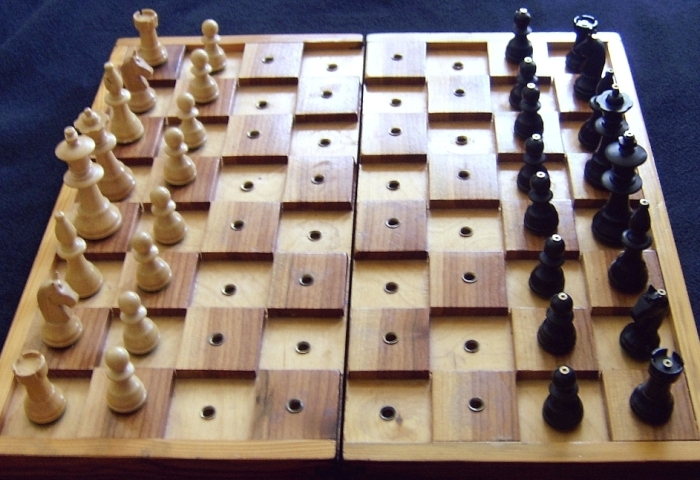
Chessboard for blind players (Note: This chessboard for the blind has its black pieces distinguished by feel, with a pin on top. The black squares are raised above the white, and all squares have holes so the pieces can be stuck in them, so pieces won't be disturbed by being touched.)

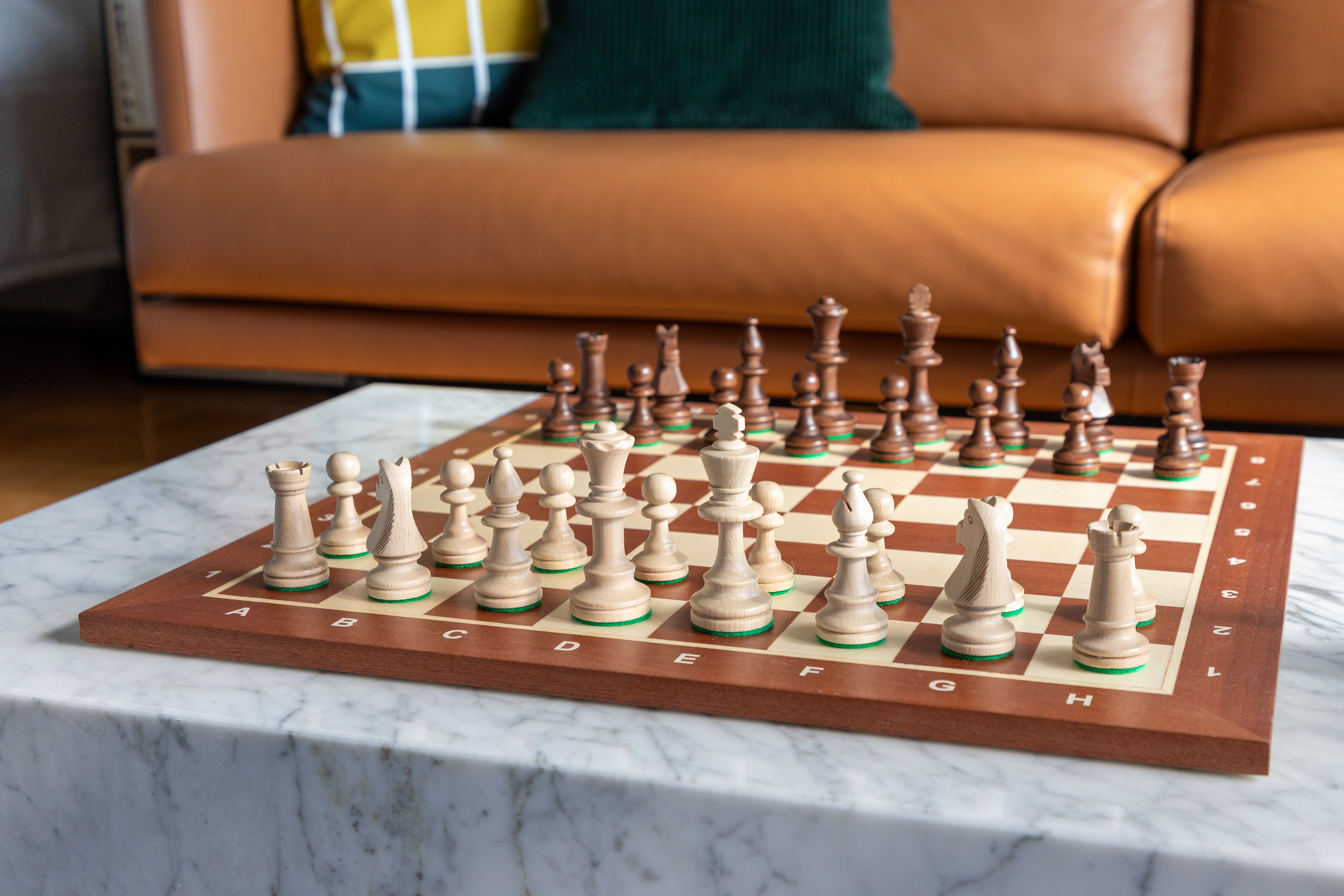
Węgiel set from Poland

== See also ==
- Chess equipment
- Dubrovnik chess set
- Gökyay Association Chess Museum
