= Chessboard =

Any board used in the game chess

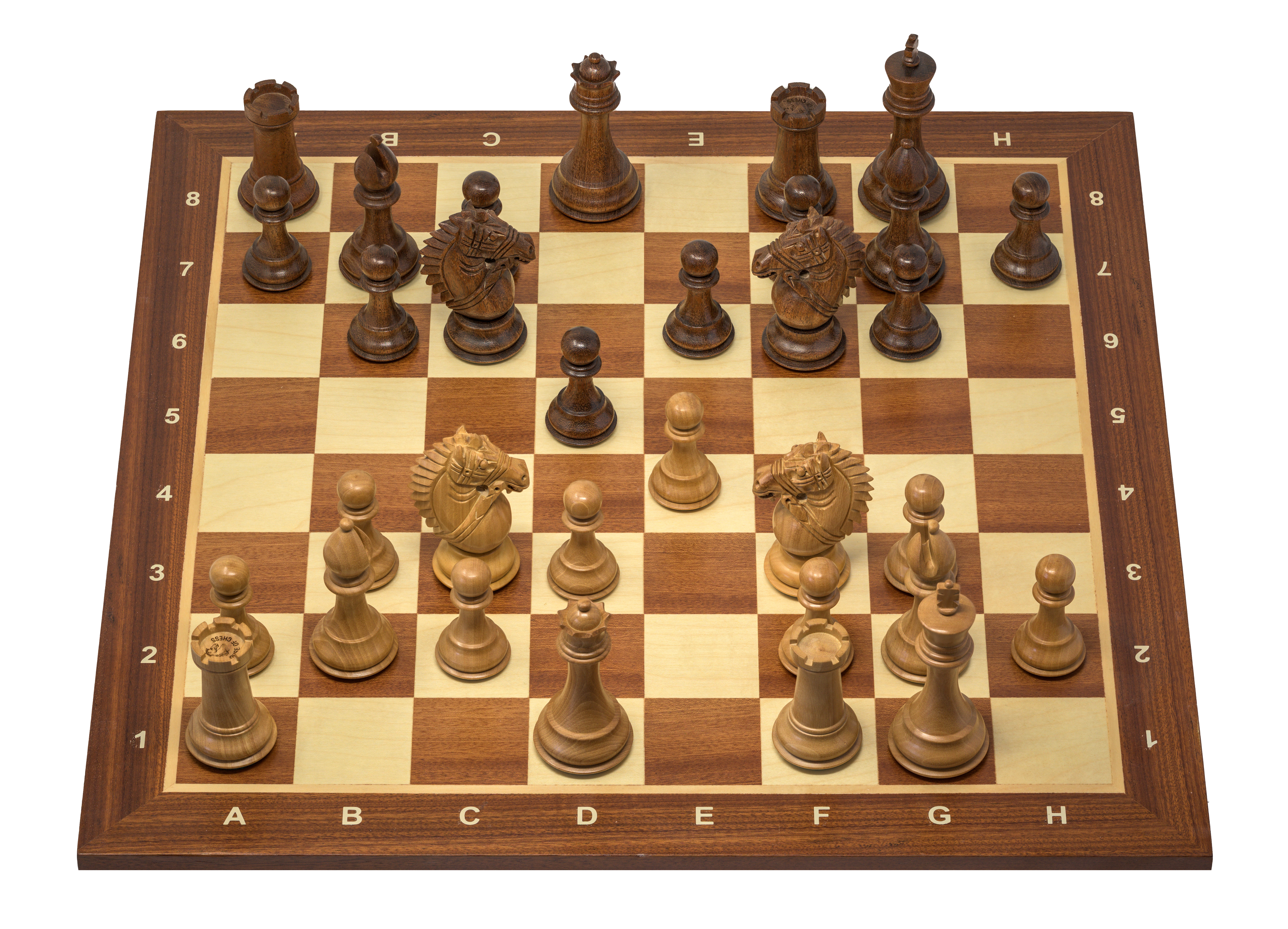
A wooden chessboard with Staunton pieces

A chessboard is a game board used to play chess. It consists of 64 squares, 8 rows by 8 columns, on which the chess pieces are placed. It is square in shape and uses two colors of squares, one light and one dark (not always), in a checkered pattern. During play, the board is oriented such that each player's near-right corner square is a light square.

The columns of a chessboard are known as files, the rows are known as ranks, and the lines of adjoining same-colored squares (each running from one edge of the board to an adjacent edge) are known as diagonals. Each square of the board is named using algebraic, descriptive, or numeric chess notation; algebraic notation is the FIDE standard. In algebraic notation, using White's perspective, files are labeled a through h from left to right, and ranks are labeled 1 through 8 from bottom to top; each square is identified by the file and rank that it occupies. The a- through d-files constitute the queenside, and the e- through h-files constitute the kingside; the 1st through 4th ranks constitute White's side, and the 5th through 8th ranks constitute Black's side.

== The history and evolution ==
	a	b	c	d	e	f	g	h
8	a8	b8	c8	d8	e8	f8	g8	h8	8
7	a7	b7	c7	d7	e7	f7	g7	h7	7
6	a6	b6	c6	d6	e6	f6	g6	h6	6
5	a5	b5	c5	d5	e5	f5	g5	h5	5
4	a4	b4	c4	d4	e4	f4	g4	h4	4
3	a3	b3	c3	d3	e3	f3	g3	h3	3
2	a2	b2	c2	d2	e2	f2	g2	h2	2
1	a1	b1	c1	d1	e1	f1	g1	h1	1
	a	b	c	d	e	f	g	h

Ashtāpada board on which chaturanga was played

The earliest known ancestor of the chessboard is the Ashtāpada board. Among other games, it was used to play chaturanga, a historical precursor to chess, beginning around the 6th century in India. The board uses a single color for all squares and is divided into eight columns by eight rows, with marked squares called castles in the corners of each quadrant. Unlike in Ashtāpada, castles serve no function in chaturanga.

The chessboard acquired its modern checkered pattern in the 10th century with the arrival of chess in Europe. This pattern was based on that of the then-5×5 draughts board. As a result of this change, each diagonal was now highlighted by a continuous sequence of same-colored squares, which later facilitated the introduction of the modern bishop and queen movements in the 15th century.

The Libro de los juegos (1283) contains a description of the chessboard, describing eight rows and columns as the ideal number, deeming the practice of chess on the 10×10 board too tiresome and on the 6×6 board too quick. In the 13th century, some players began using the convention that the first square of the far right column should be light-colored; this convention was endorsed by Pedro Damiano at the end of the 15th century.

In contemporary chess, a digital chess board is a chess board connected to a computer that is capable of transmitting the moves to the computer itself: the information about the moves can be used to play a game against a chess engine, or simply to record the moves of a game automatically. A digital board uses sensors to detect the position of the pieces, and each piece move can be recorded.

In 1998, the 33rd Chess Olympiad was held in Elista. The games were digitally broadcast over the internet thanks to the introduction of digital chess boards developed by Digital Game Technology: 328 boards were used for the event.

In 2003, ex-world champion Garry Kasparov faced chess engine X3D Fritz in a series of four matches in a virtual environment, where the computer-generated board hovered in the air in front of Kasparov, who used special glasses. This was the first man–machine game of chess performed in a completely simulated environment.

== Manufacture ==
Chessboards have been made from numerous materials over the years, such as ebony, ivory, marble, metal, glass, and plastic. They can also be found as decorative elements in plazas, gardens, and living rooms.

High-level games generally use wooden boards, while vinyl, plastic, and cardboard are common for less important tournaments and matches, as well as for home use. Additionally, some very large chessboards are built into or drawn on the ground. Rarely, decorative glass and marble boards are permitted for games conducted by national or international chess federations.

Wooden boards are traditionally made of unstained woods that are light brown and dark brown in color. To reduce cost, some boards are made with veneers of more expensive woods glued to an inner piece of plywood or chipboard. A variety of color combinations are used for plastic, vinyl, and silicone boards. Common dark-light combinations are black and white, as well as brown, green or blue with buff or cream.

For international or continental championships, FIDE's regulations state that wooden boards should be used. For other FIDE tournaments, wood, plastic, or cardboard boards may be used, and the board should be rigid in all instances. The board may also be made of marble, as long as there is an appropriate contrast between the light and dark squares. The finishing should be neutral or frosted but never shiny. The squares should be from 5 to 6 cm in length, at least twice the diameter of a pawn's base. If the table and the board are two separate pieces, the latter must be fixed so it stays in place.

== Board notation ==
There are various systems for recording moves and referring to the squares of the chessboard; the standard contemporary system is algebraic notation. In algebraic notation, the files are identified by the letters a to h, from left to right from the White player's point of view, and the ranks by the numbers 1 to 8, with 1 being closest to the White player. Each square on the board is identified by a unique coordinate pairing, from a1 to h8.

In the older descriptive notation, the files are labelled by the piece originally occupying its first rank (e.g. queen, king's rook, queen's bishop), and ranks by the numbers 1 to 8 from each player's point of view. This method is no longer commonly used. FIDE stopped using descriptive notation in 1981.

ICCF numeric notation assigns numbers to both files and ranks, with rank 1 being the one closest to the player with the white pieces. The file leftmost to the White player (a in algebraic notation and QR in descriptive notation) is file one and the rightmost to them (h in algebraic notation and KR in descriptive notation) is file eight.

== Variant boards ==
Variant chessboard shapes and sizes go back to the Persian origins of the game in the 10th century, when the book Muraj adh-dhahab (Board of the Gods) described six different variants of chess, including circular and cylinder chess. Due to the widespread creation of new variants, a wide variety of sizes can be found. Gliński's hexagonal chess utilizes a board with 91 hexagonal spaces of three different colors. One innovation of the 13th century was the cylindrical board for use in cylinder chess.

The board used for the Persian Tamerlane chess is one of the first recorded variant chessboards, with eleven columns by ten rows along with two citadels. Each player has a citadel to the right of their second rank, which may be occupied by the opponent's king, in which case that opponent may declare a draw. In 1617, Pietro Carrera proposed a variant that received his name, Carrera's Chess, with a 10×8 board, later used in other variants such as Capablanca chess and Gothic Chess. Other sizes, with ten rows by ten columns, are used in Omega Chess and Grand Chess; Omega Chess has four additional squares, one in each corner of the board. Los Alamos chess uses a smaller 6×6 board.

Japanese shogi uses a board with nine columns by nine rows. The board of Chinese xianqi consists of nine columns by ten rows; here, the pieces are placed on the intersections of the lines that divide the squares, rather than within the squares themselves. Each player has a 3×3 palace in the central three columns and the closest three rows, within which the player's general and advisors must stay. Between the central two rows is a river that the elephant cannot cross and past which the soldier increases in strength. A similar board without a river is used in Korean janggi.

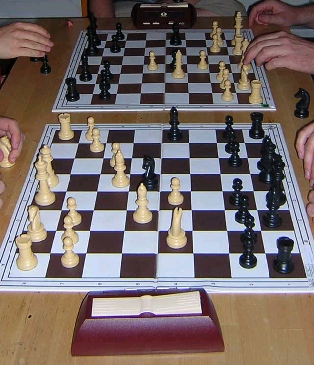
Chessboards during a match of Bughouse

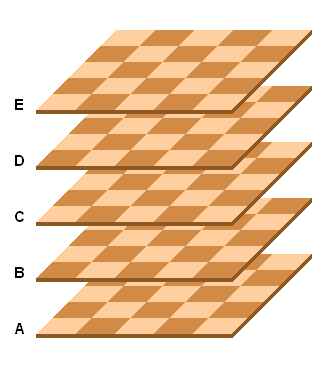
Raumschach gamespace

Some chess variants use more than a single board per match. Bughouse chess, for example, involves four players playing two simultaneous matches on separate boards. Alice Chess is a popular variant which is usually played on two boards to facilitate the movement of pieces between the boards. Three-dimensional boards are often represented by multiple two-dimensional boards. Variants may use anywhere from two to eight boards. For example, Raumschach utilizes five boards of twenty-five squares each, totaling 125 squares. Another noteworthy variant, Star Trek Chess, utilizes a board of sixty-four squares with movable parts divided into seven levels. In the initial position, each player occupies two of the movable four-square attack boards. The white pieces start in the lower level, using attack boards connected to this level and the first two rows of the board, while the black pieces start at the top, using the attack boards and first two rows of the third level.

== Other representations ==
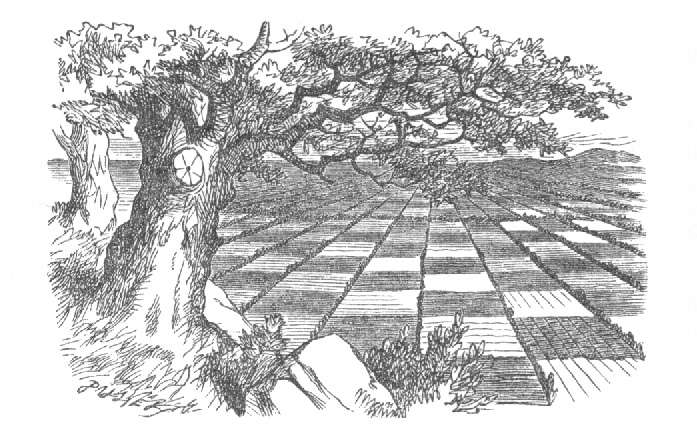
Illustration by Sir John Tenniel from the book Through the Looking-Glass by Lewis Carroll, where the chessboard is represented by fields and brooks that Alice must traverse

The game of chess has been represented in the arts since its creation. Chess sets usually had considerable artistic value; they were made of noble materials, such as ebony and ivory, and in large sizes. Many of the pieces in these sets were offered to churches as relics. The book Liber miraculorum sancte Fidis tells a story in which a nobleman, after miraculously escaping from prison, is forced to carry a chessboard until a sanctuary as gesture of gratitude. More frequently, however, there are stories in which the chessboard is used as a weapon. The French tale of Ogier the Dane reports how the son of Charlemagne brutally kills one of Ogier's sons with a chessboard after losing a match, although there is no evidence confirming the veracity of the story.

In 1250, a sermon called Quaedam moralitas de scaccario per Innocentium papum (The Innocent Morality) showed the world as being represented by a chessboard. The white and black squares represented the two conditions of life and death, or praise and censure; over these, the pieces, representing humanity, would confront each other in the adversities of the game, which symbolized life.

Due to its simple geometry, the chessboard is often used in mathematical puzzles or problems unrelated to chess, such as the wheat and chessboard problem and the mutilated chessboard problem. The term infinite chessboard is sometimes used to refer to a grid.

== Gallery ==
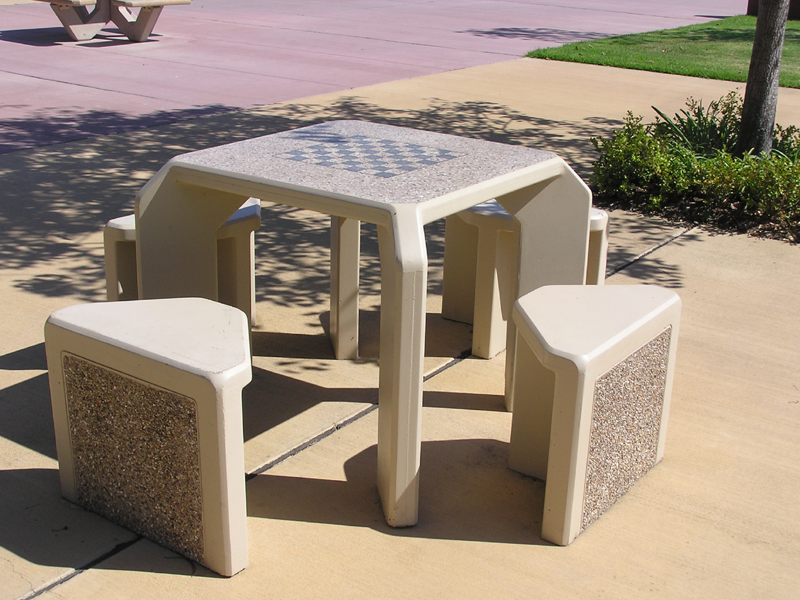
A chessboard is often painted or engraved on a chess table

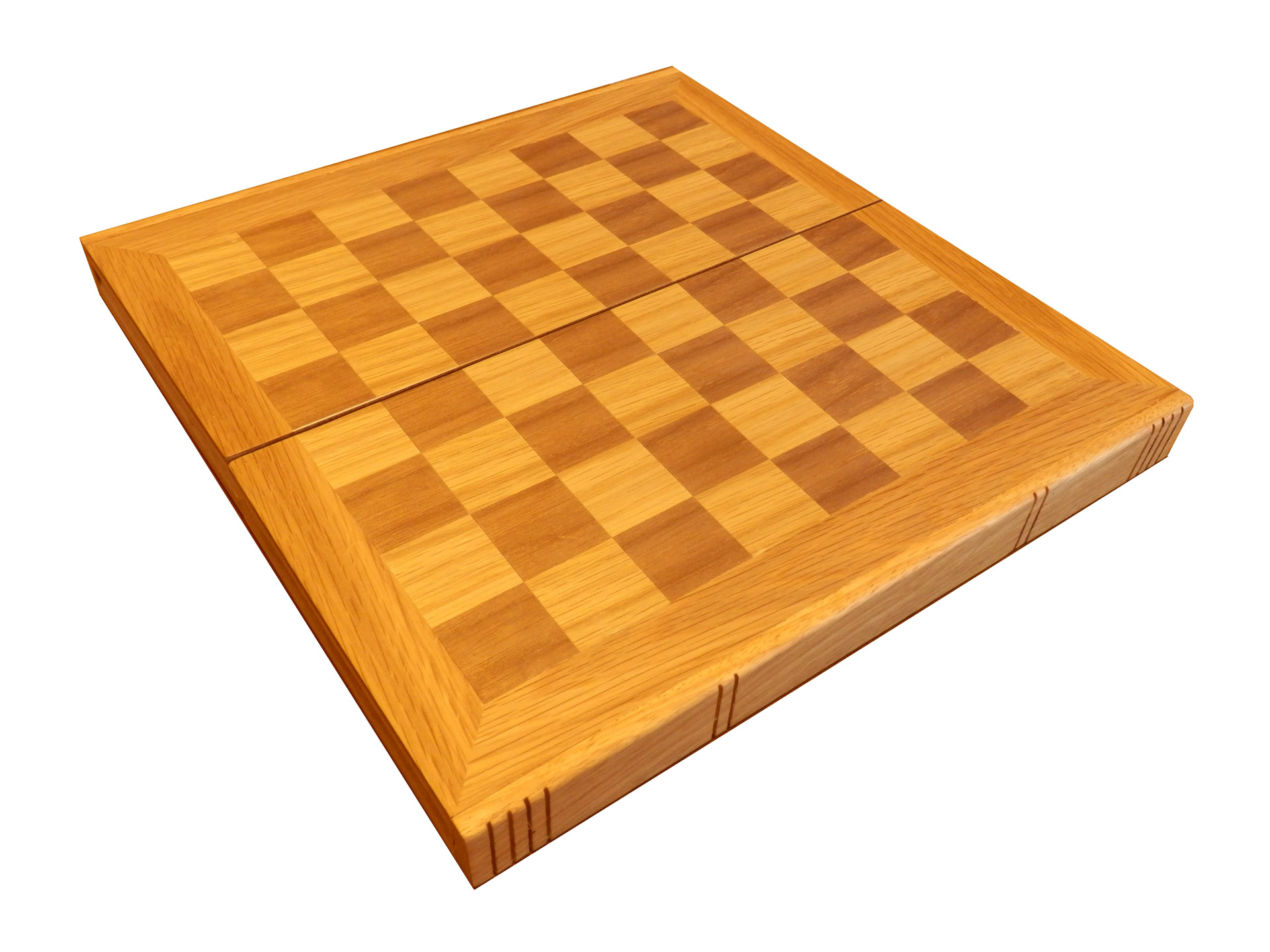
A folding wooden chessboard

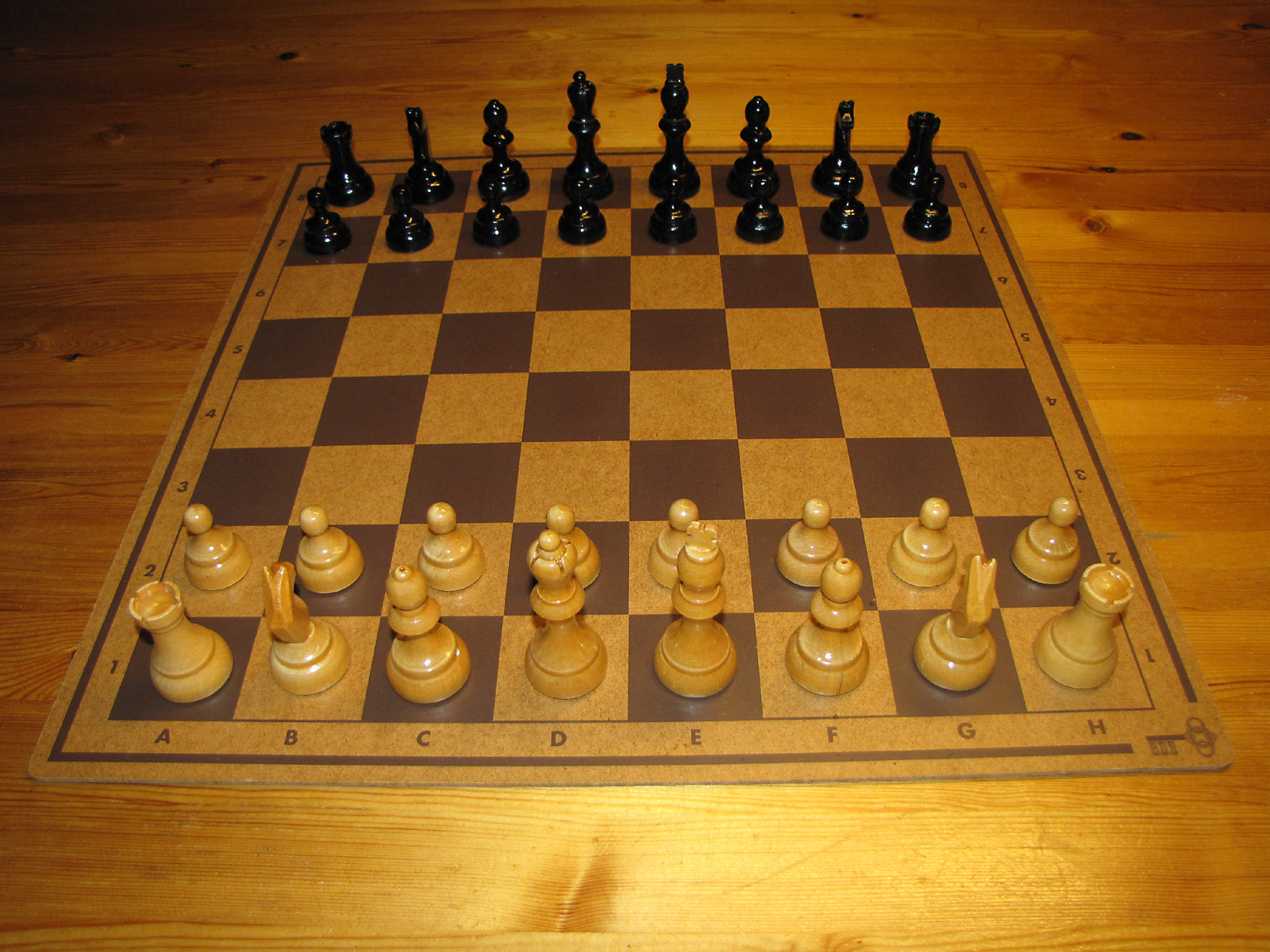
A Swedish competition standard chessboard made of masonite

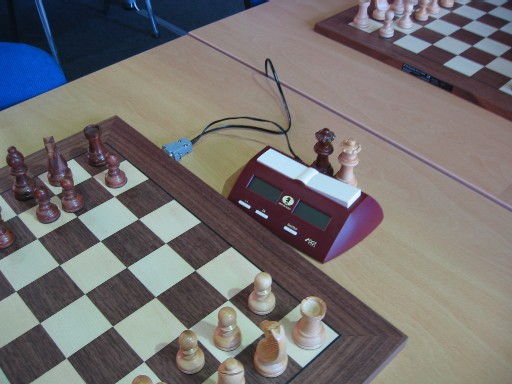
DGT Electronic Chessboard that detects moves and interfaces to chess clock and computers

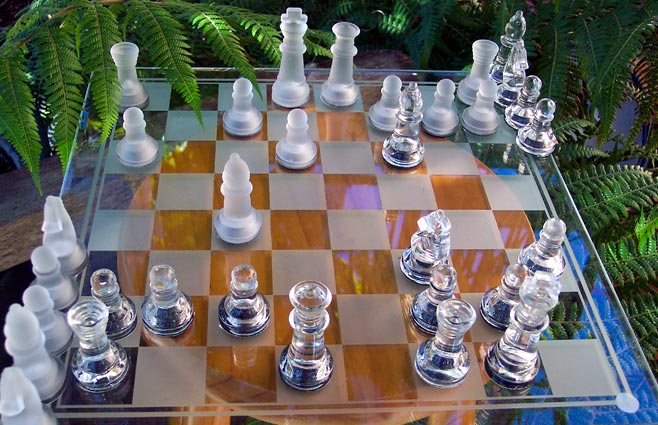
A decorative chessboard made of glass

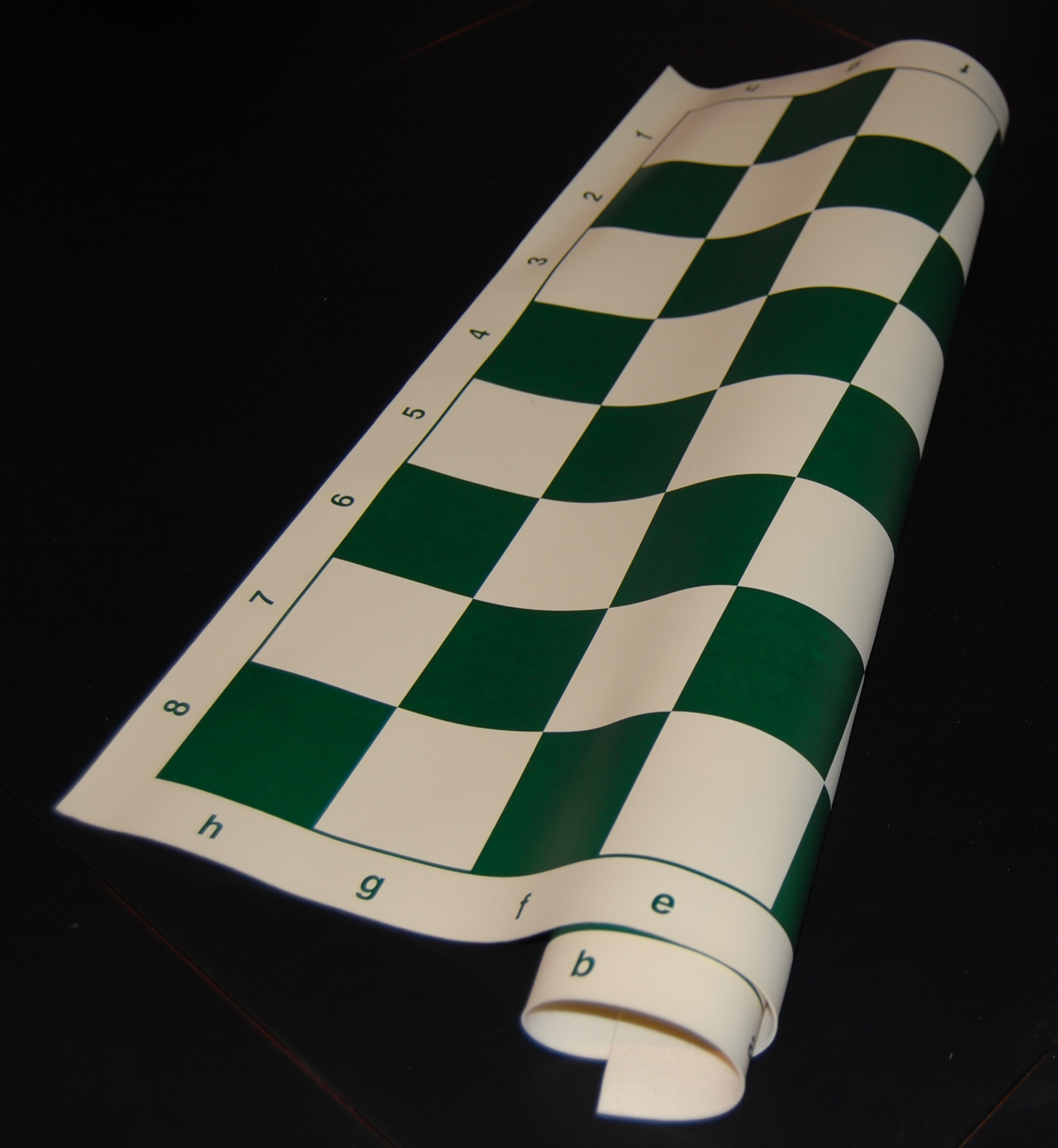
A portable green and buff vinyl rollup board

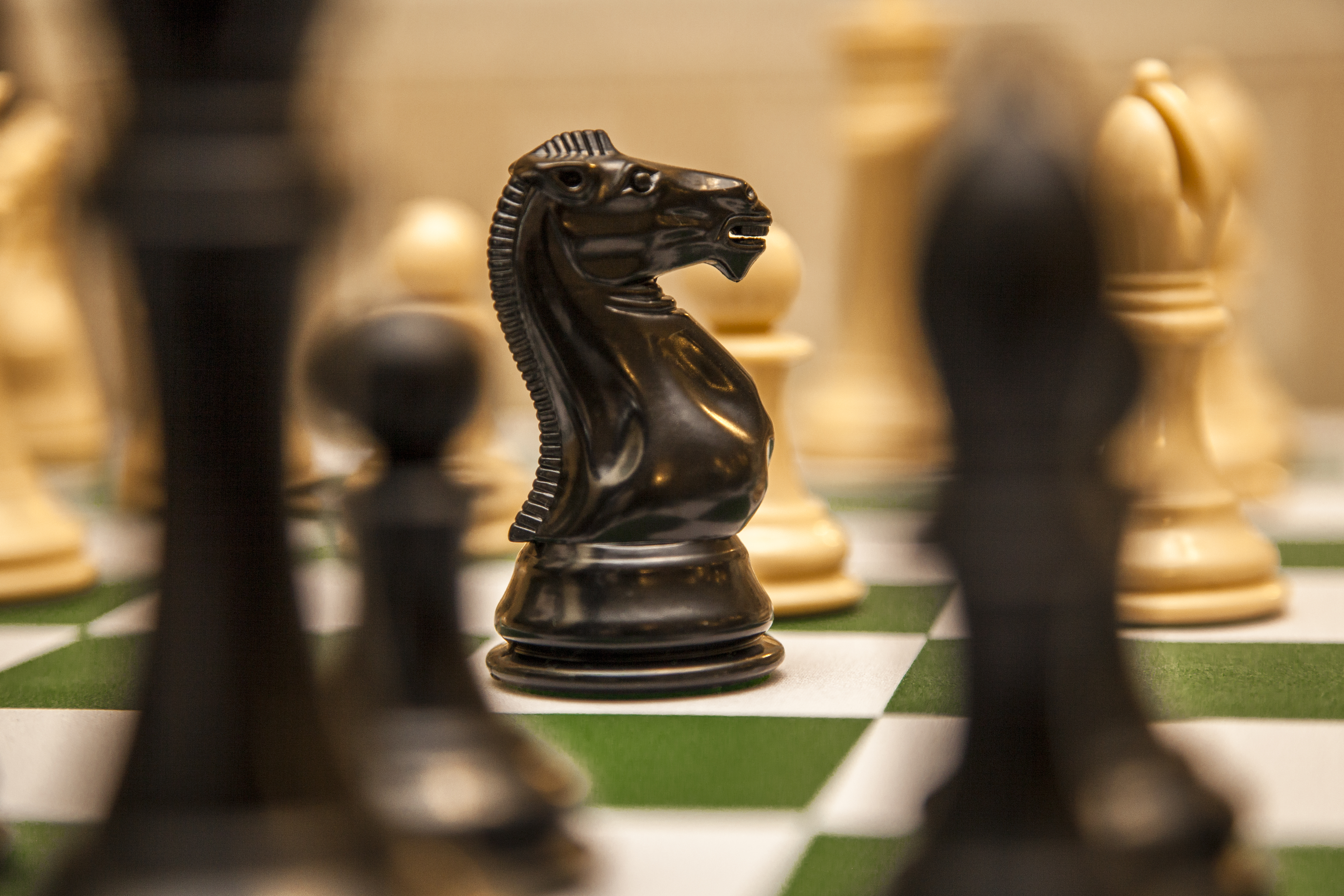
A portable green and white mousepad style board designed to lie perfectly flat

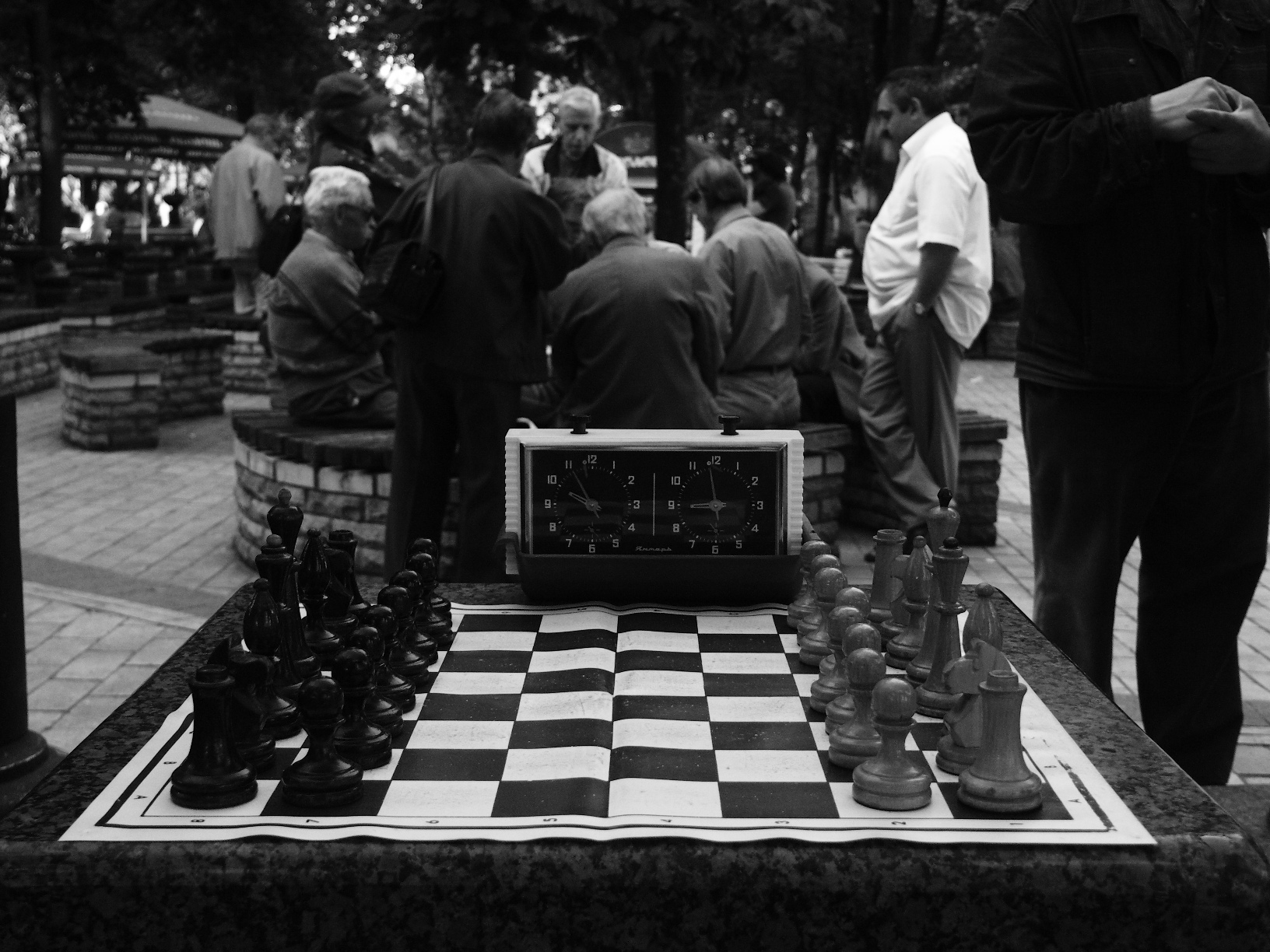
Social play on a vinyl board in a park in Kyiv

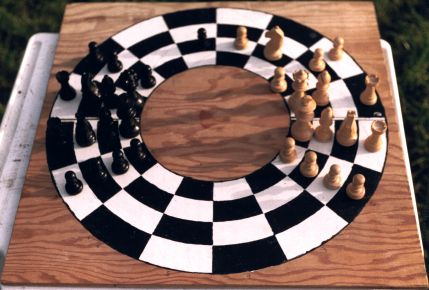
A board of circular chess, one of the many variants of traditional chess

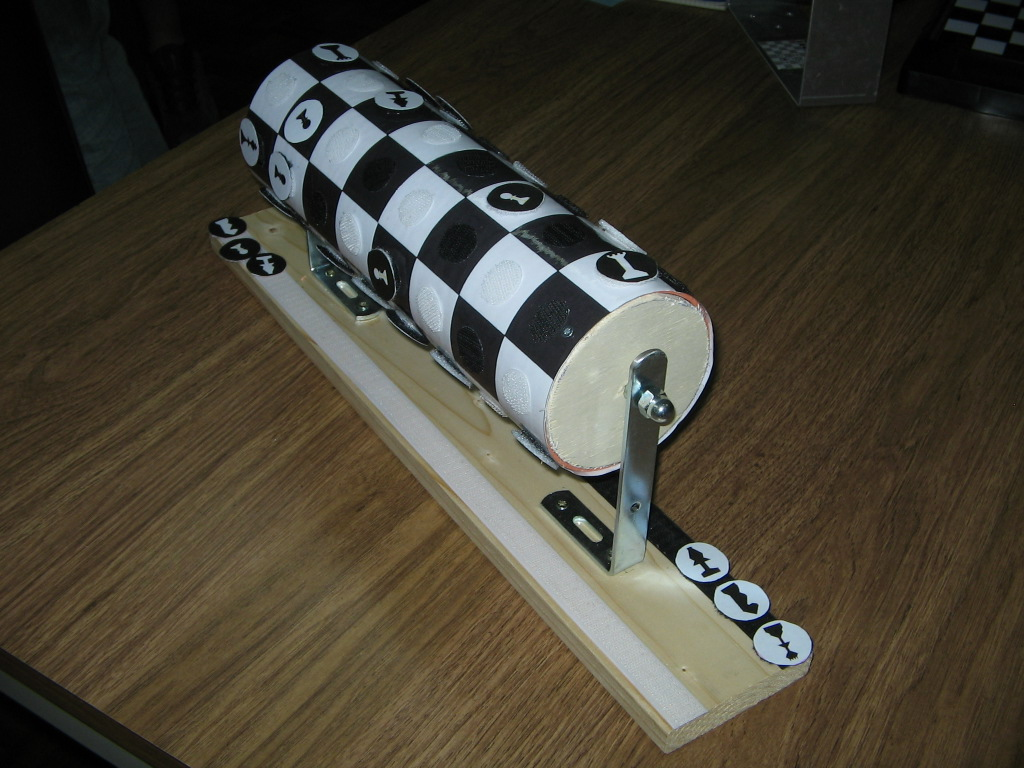
Cylinder chess, another variant of traditional chess

Gliński's hexagonal chess is a variant with a hexagonal board

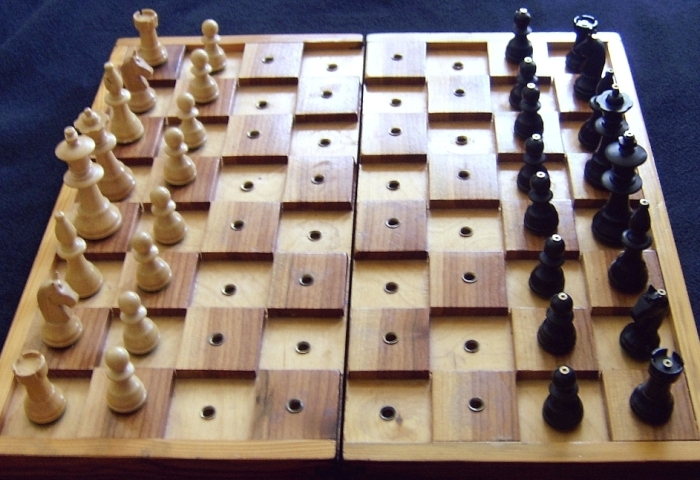
Chessboard adapted for visually impaired people

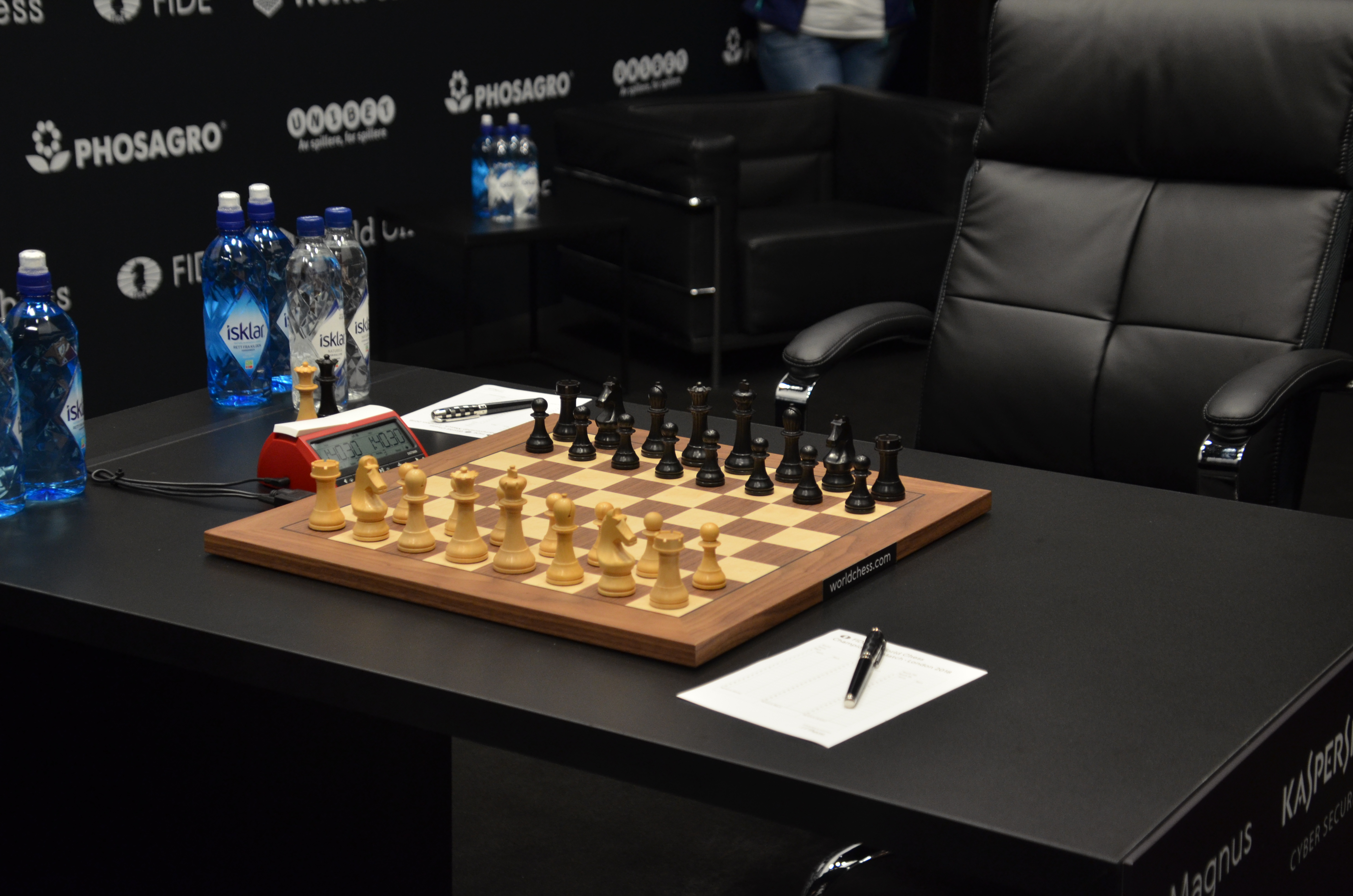
Chessboard of the World Chess Championship 2018

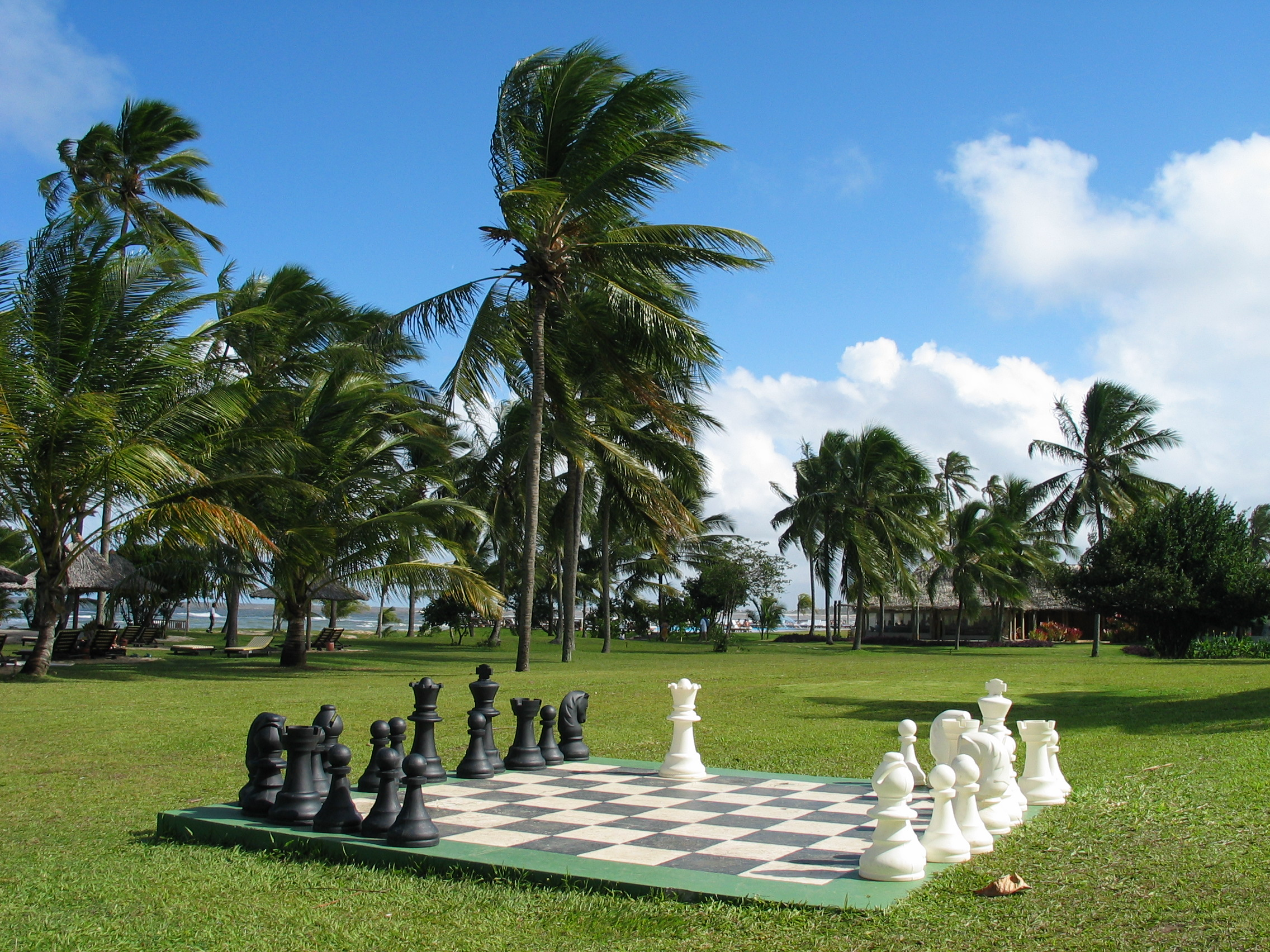
A giant outdoor chessboard, with pieces about three feet (91 cm) tall

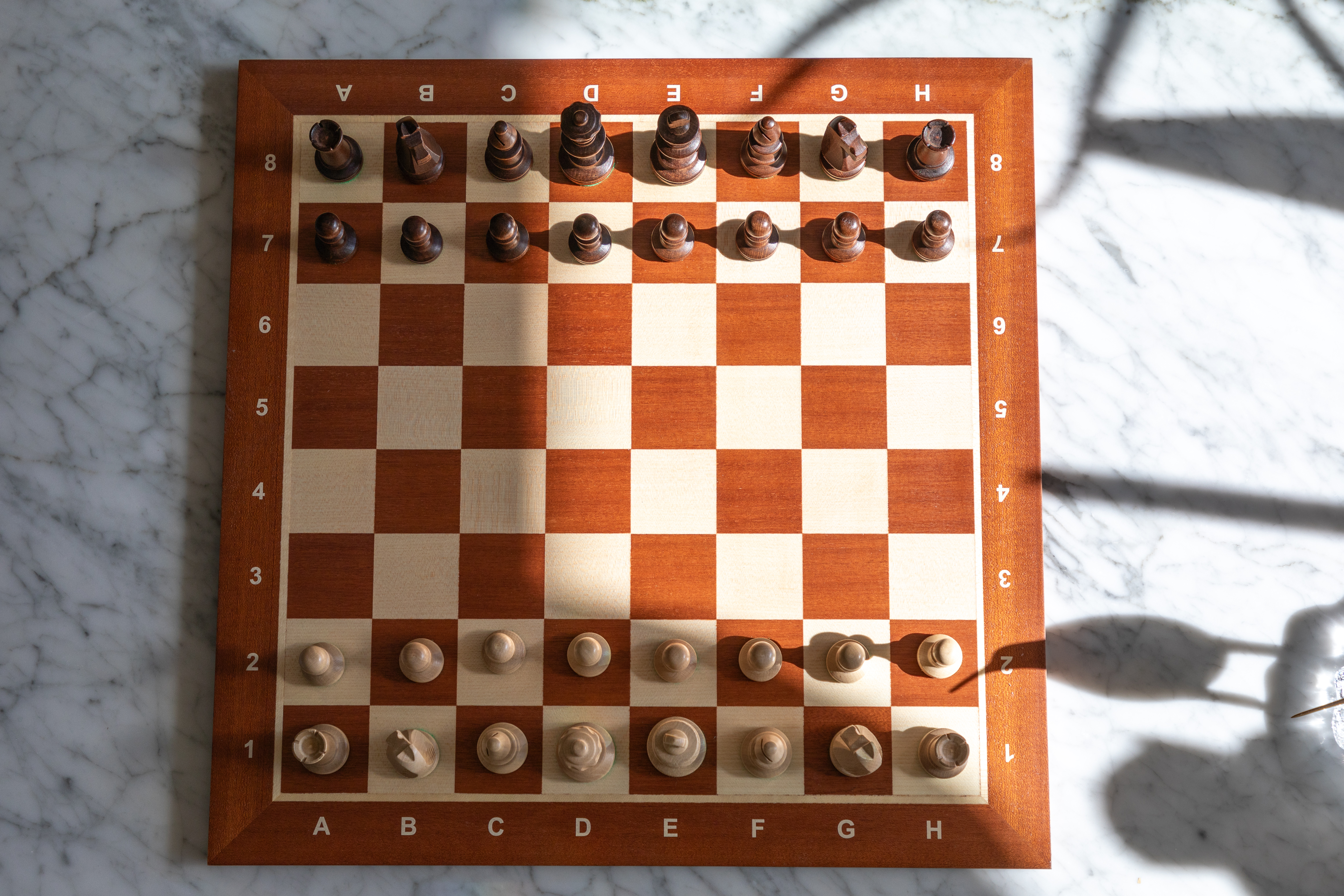
Polish Węgiel board with pieces

SVG board and chess pieces, to display game positions on a webpage

Variant chessboard of 76 squares suggested by F. V. Morley

== See also ==
- Board representation (chess)
- Checkerboard
- Chess equipment
- Chess set
- Rules of chess
- White and Black in chess
