= Gökyay Association Chess Museum =

Chess museum in Ankara, Turkey

Coordinates: 39.93474°N 32.86290°E

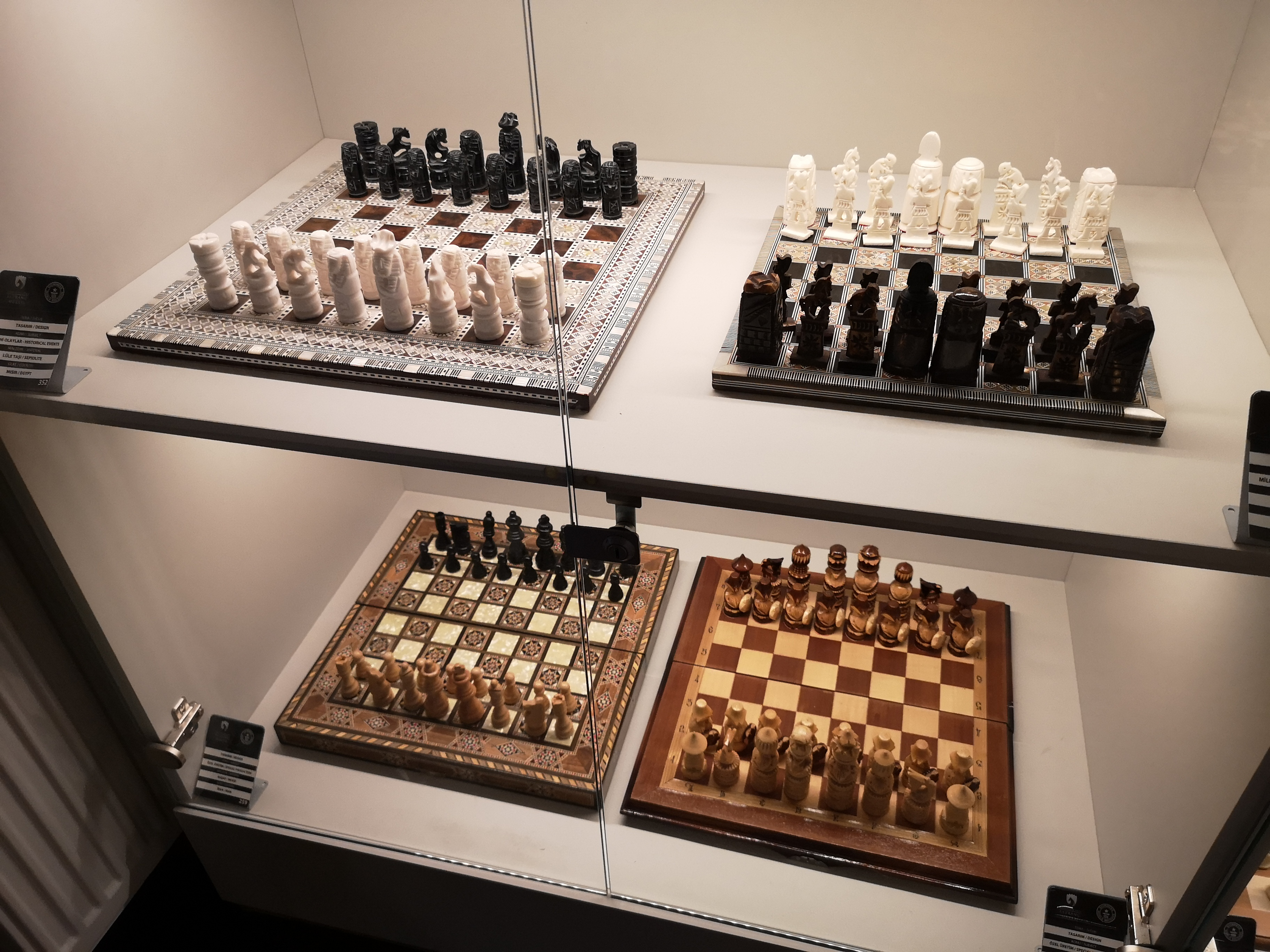
Various chess sets on display

The Gökyay Association Chess Museum is located in Altındağ, Ankara, Turkey, and displayed in a historical home. As of 2024 the museum has the largest chess set collection in the world with 723 chess sets collected from 110 countries exhibited under four main themes in an area of 1,008 square metres (10,850 sq ft). There is a variety of chess sets representing various cultures and events, made with materials including wood, metal, fishbone, marble, soapstone, felt, polyester, metal, marble, sheet metal and cast iron.

The museum also frequently organizes and is home to various chess tournaments.

== See also ==
- World Chess Hall of Fame
- Bobby Fischer Center
