= Chess equipment =

Items used to play a game of chess

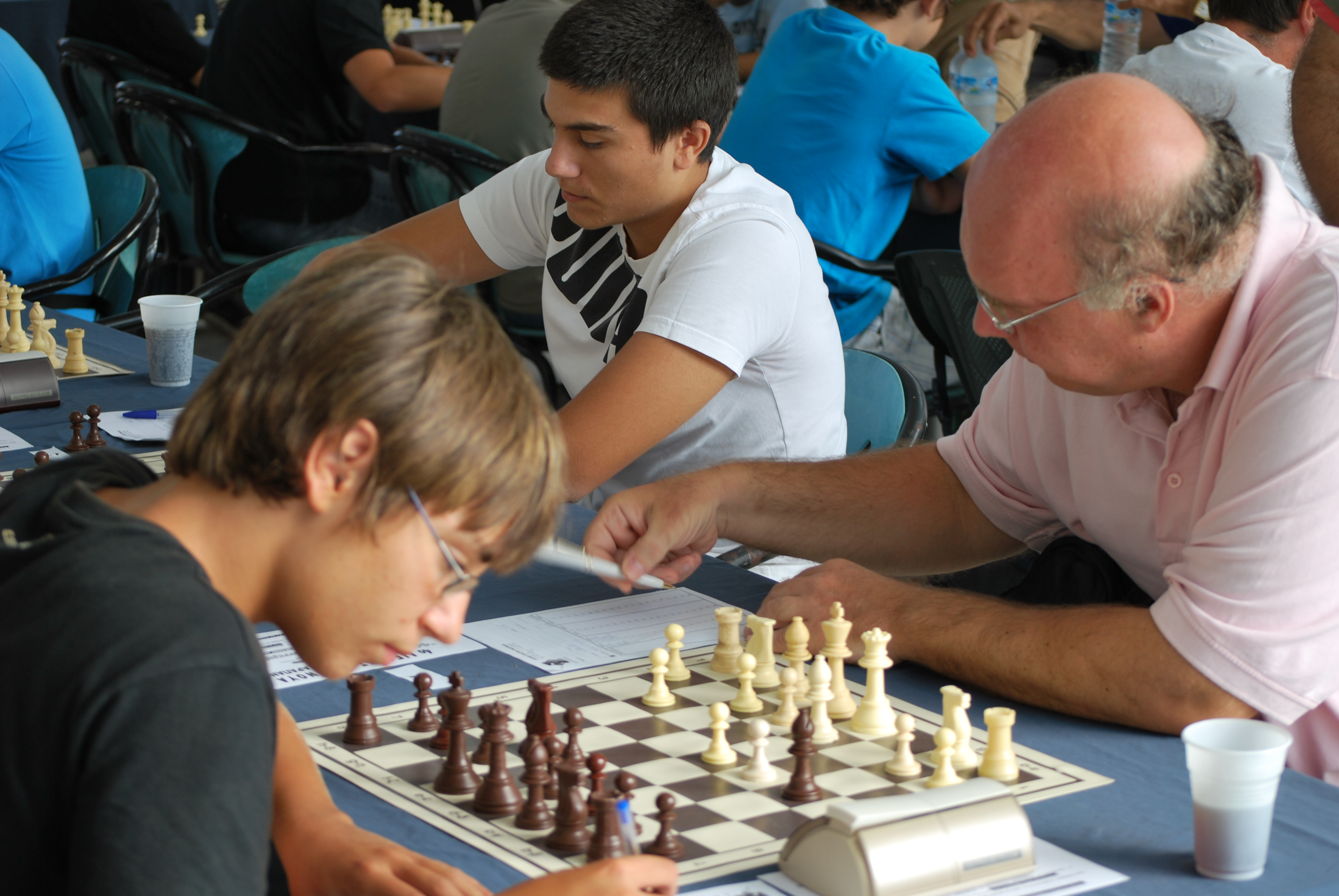
Players at a chess tournament, with chess clock and score sheets

Chess equipment are the tangible items required to play a game of chess. To have an over-the-board (OTB) chess tournament the equipment required includes: chess pieces, chessboard, chess clock, score sheets, pen to record the moves and table. A chess player playing a game of online chess, correspondence chess, computer chess or non-tournament chess may choose their own preferred configuration of chess equipment. Receiving assistance from A.I. based software is prohibited in the majority of chess tournaments, regardless if they played over-the-board or with long-distance methods such as online chess or correspondence chess.

Fédération Internationale des Échecs (FIDE) or the World Chess Federation, the game's international governing body, states that in tournaments that it runs, that If necessary FIDE will determine the general conditions for other equipment needed in chess competitions, such as score sheets, demonstration boards, etc.^{[1]}

FIDE recommends that chess equipment used in top level competitions is approved by participating players. In the case of a disagreement by either player, the equipment to be used should be decided by the Chief Organiser or the Chief Arbiter of the event. FIDE highly recommends that all chess equipment used in a competition is standardized for all players and games.

== See also ==
- Chess set, chess pieces and a chessboard
