= Cylinder chess =

Chess variant

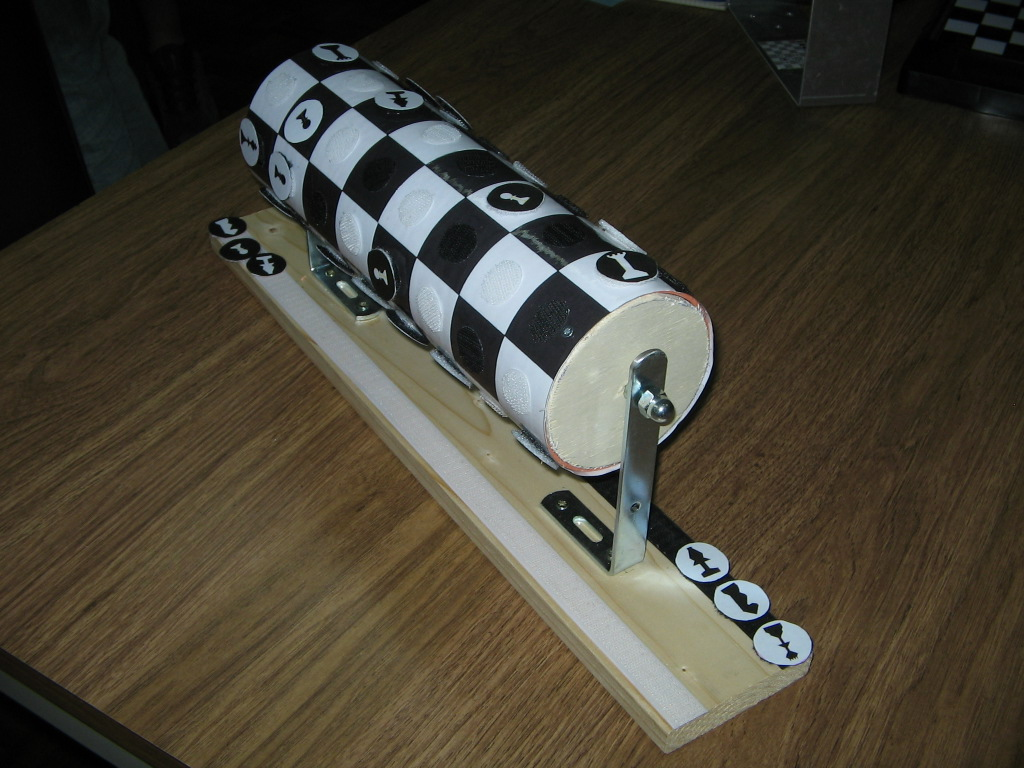
Cylindrical chessboard

Cylinder chess (or cylindrical chess) is a chess variant. The game is played as if the board were a cylinder, with the left side of the board joined to the right side.

The cylindrical board is used in some fairy chess problems.

== Rules and gameplay ==
Position: b8 black cross, d8 black cross, a7 black cross, e7 black cross, f6 black cross, h6 black cross, g5 black cross, a4 black circle, f4 black cross, g4 black circle, h4 black cross, a3 black cross, b3 black circle, e3 black cross, f3 black circle, b2 black cross, d2 black cross, h2 black knight, b1 black circle, c1 white bishop, f1 black circle

The diagram shows possible moves of a bishop on c1 and a knight on h2 on a cylindrical board. The bishop cannot move through the board's upper and lower sides.

The game is played as if the left and right sides of the board are connected. When a piece goes off one edge of the board, it reappears from the other edge. For example, it is legal to move a rook from a3 to h3, even if there is a piece on b3, since the rook can move left from a3; a bishop on c1 can move to h4 by going from c1 to a3, and then going up and left from a3 to h4; if White has a pawn on a5, Black has a pawn on h7 and Black plays 1...h7–h5, White can capture the black pawn en passant with 2.axh6; and so on.

Castling can be handled in one of three ways:

1. Castling is allowed, but not with a rook over the board edge. This maintains the options for castling available in standard chess.
2. Castling is not allowed. Proponents of this convention argue that cylinder chess nullifies the purpose of castling, as all files are equally dangerous on a cylindrical board.
3. In addition to normal castling, castling with a rook over the board edge is also allowed. This is done by moving the king two squares toward the rook and moving the rook to the square that the king passed over (in the same manner as usual).

One possible rule variation in cylinder chess is to allow null moves, or moves such that every piece stays in the same place, as long as any piece performing such a move travels a nonzero distance by crossing over the edge of the board; only a rook or queen can perform such a move. This variation is rare in actual play, but it is often seen in cylinder chess problems.

== Strategy ==
Position: a8 black rook, b8 black knight, c8 black bishop, d8 black queen, e8 black king, f8 black bishop, g8 black knight, h8 black rook, a7 black pawn, b7 black pawn, c7 black pawn, d7 black pawn, e7 black cross, f7 black pawn, g7 black pawn, h7 black pawn, f6 black cross, e5 black pawn, g5 black cross, h4 black cross, a3 black cross, b3 white pawn, a2 white pawn, b2 black cross, c2 white pawn, d2 white pawn, e2 white pawn, f2 white pawn, g2 white pawn, h2 white pawn, a1 white rook, b1 white knight, c1 white bishop, d1 white queen, e1 white king, f1 white bishop, g1 white knight, h1 white rook

Position after 1.b3 e5: The diagram shows the weakness of the move 1...e5 by Black, as the c1-bishop has been allowed access to the edge of the board by way of the movement of the b3-pawn. This principle applies to an easy check on a player's king by an enemy bishop in the same manner.

In cylinder chess, the traditional hierarchy of piece strengths is changed, with bishops being significantly stronger than knights. The knight and rook do not gain much more power from the cylindrical board, but bishops and especially queens become stronger. The center squares are unimportant to control, and moving a pawn to the center in the opening is very weakening because it opens the player's center to attacks by the opponent's bishops, which have been allowed faster access to the flank squares.

Cylinder chess also has different endgames than standard chess. For example, unlike in standard chess, a king and rook cannot force checkmate against a lone king on the cylindrical board. Additionally, two rooks cannot deliver a ladder mate against an opposing lone king along the files as the latter would wrap around to the other side (but are still able to do so on the ranks).

Piece values according to H. G. Muller are as follows:

Symbol					
Piece	pawn	knight	bishop	rook	queen
Value	1	3 1/4	4	5	11

== In chess problems ==
Position: c6 black pawn, h6 white rook, b5 black king, c5 black pawn, h4 white rook, a3 white king

White to play and mate in two

The diagram shows a cylinder chess problem that allows null moves. The move 1.Rg4, threatening 2.Rg5#, fails due to 1...Ka5. The solution is to put Black in zugzwang by playing 1.Rh4, moving the rook on h4 to its own square; then, after either 1...Ka5 or 1...c4, 2.R4h5 is mate.

== Related variants ==
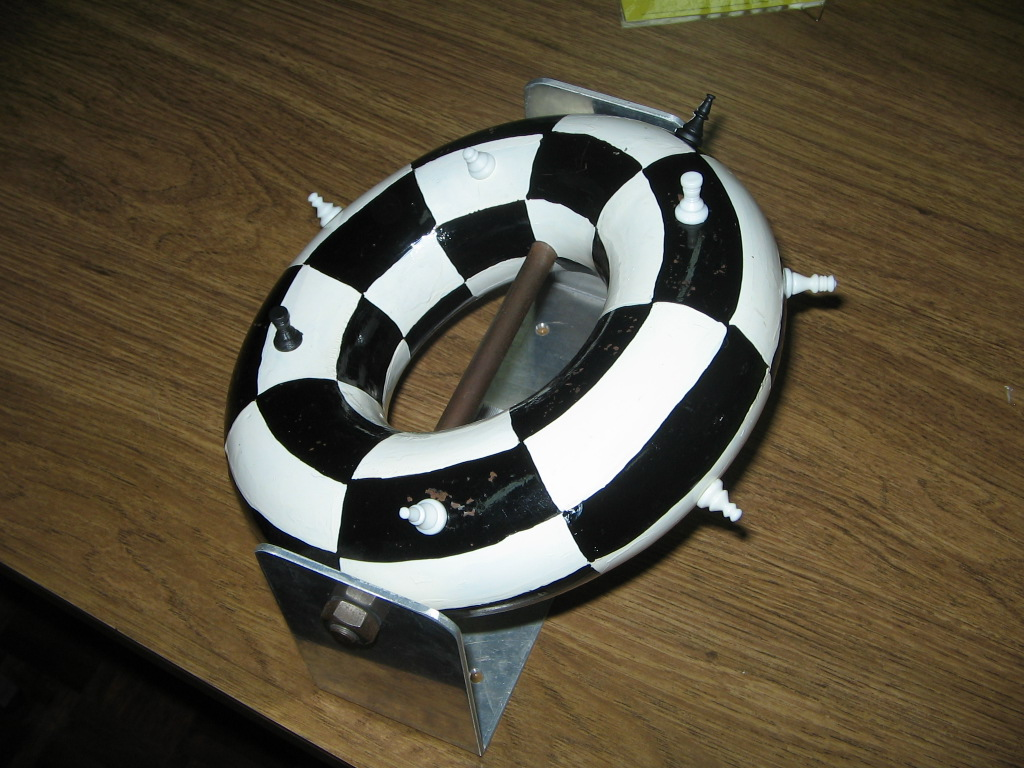
Toroidal chessboard

Position: a8 black rook, c8 black bishop, f8 black bishop, h8 black rook, a7 black pawn, b7 black pawn, g7 black pawn, h7 black pawn, a6 black knight, c6 black pawn, d6 black queen, e6 black king, f6 black pawn, h6 black knight, d5 black pawn, e5 black pawn, d4 white pawn, e4 white pawn, a3 white knight, c3 white pawn, d3 white queen, e3 white king, f3 white pawn, h3 white knight, a2 white pawn, b2 white pawn, g2 white pawn, h2 white pawn, a1 white rook, c1 white bishop, f1 white bishop, h1 white rook

Toroidal chess starting position

In horizontal cylinder chess, the first and last ranks of the chessboard are connected. In toroidal chess, the board has the form of a torus (donut shape). A toroidal board can be formed by connecting the first and last ranks of the cylindrical board.

Horizontal cylinder chess and toroidal chess, unlike cylinder chess, cannot use the starting position of standard chess; otherwise, both kings will begin the game in checkmate. The adjacent diagram shows the starting position for toroidal chess on a standard board. In the starting setup, the rooks protect each other while being threatened by the opponent's rooks. They are supported by the knights on the sides of the board, making their positions more defensible.

On the toroidal board, checkmate is impossible with king and queen versus king, but it is possible with king and two rooks versus king.

Bishops can make null moves in toroidal chess, by moving e.g. c1–d2–e3–f4–g5–h6–a7–b8–c1.
