= Clonard chess piece =

12th century chess piece in the National Museum of Ireland

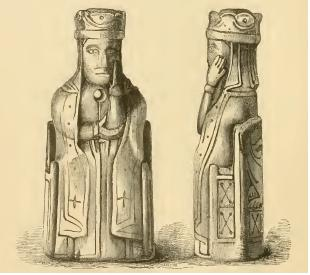
Clonard Chess Piece, Front and Left Profile

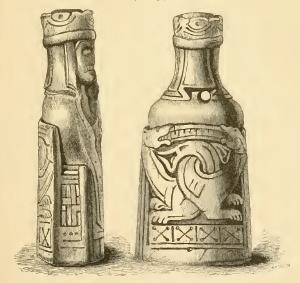
Clonard Chess piece, Rear and Right Profile

The Clonard chess piece is a historic bone or ivory playing piece depicting a queen seated on a throne, found in a bog in Clonard, County Meath, Ireland, some time before 1817. The piece dates from the late twelfth century AD and is now in the National Museum of Ireland in Dublin.

The figure may come from the same Viking workshop tradition which produced the large group known as the Lewis Chessmen, found in the Outer Hebrides, Scotland. Most of these are carved from walrus ivory, with a few made instead from whale teeth.

== Description ==
The Clonard chess piece is made of ivory or polished bone with a core of lead, with a small iron spike at the base, presumably for attachment to the playing surface. The figure has a crown and wears a shoulder length veil over a mantle. The edges of the mantle are folded back revealing a decorative border of dots and crosses. The left hand is raised to the cheek and is supported by the right hand at the elbow.

The chair the figure sits on has projecting arms. The back of the chair is decorated with a pair of two-legged dragons with backward looking heads. Their tails are fishlike and intertwined. The mouths of the animals are joined by a beaded scroll. The letters S, P and K are written on the back in Lombardic script.

A perforation through the neck seems to have been added at a later date.

== History ==
The chess piece was found in a bog in Clonard, County Meath, Ireland some time before 1817. A number of similar pieces were reportedly discovered at the same time but the queen is the sole survivor, with the rest of the pieces now lost.

As recorded by John O'Donovan in the 'Book of Rights' (1847), the Clonard pieces were in the possession of Dr Edward Francis Tuke (c.1778-1846) who had a small private museum at 106 Stephen's Green West in Dublin. Tuke reportedly gave the queen piece to George Petrie, an artist and antiquarian member of the Royal Irish Academy, around 1817.
