= Chess table =

Table on which to play chess

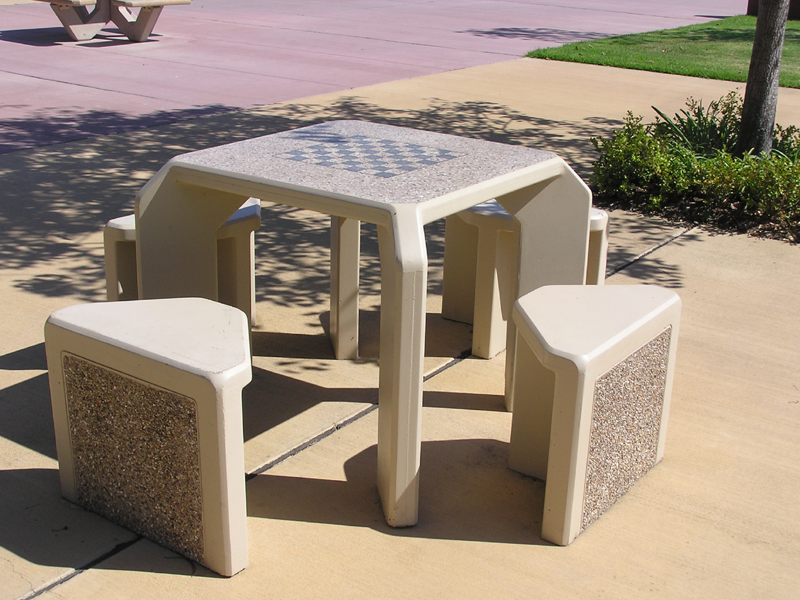
A chess table is a table with a chessboard painted or engraved on it. The photograph shows a chess table in a park.

A chess table is a table built with features to make it useful for playing the game of chess. They can come in various sizes and shapes, and are usually made of solid wood. They can be found in some cities and other public areas. Most are of a similar size to a picnic table.

== Description ==
A chess table is a table built with features to make it useful for playing the game of chess. A chess board is usually integral to the table top and often two drawers are provided to hold the pieces when not in use. Most chess tables have the board inlaid or engraved, though cheaper tables may have it painted on. Chess tables can be extremely decorative, well made and potentially expensive pieces of furniture. A chess table is not necessary to play chess and is not restricted only to playing chess.

== Materials ==
Chess tables are typically made of solid wood, with rosewood, cedar, and mahogany being the most popular. Exotic wood versions are also available.

== Location ==
Many cities and universities have chess tables in their parks and gardens. Many coffeehouses also have chess tables. Most are the size of a normal picnic table, although some are larger than life sets that use pieces that are about the size of a small barrel.

== See also ==
- Chess equipment
- Park furniture
- Washington Square Park

== Gallery ==
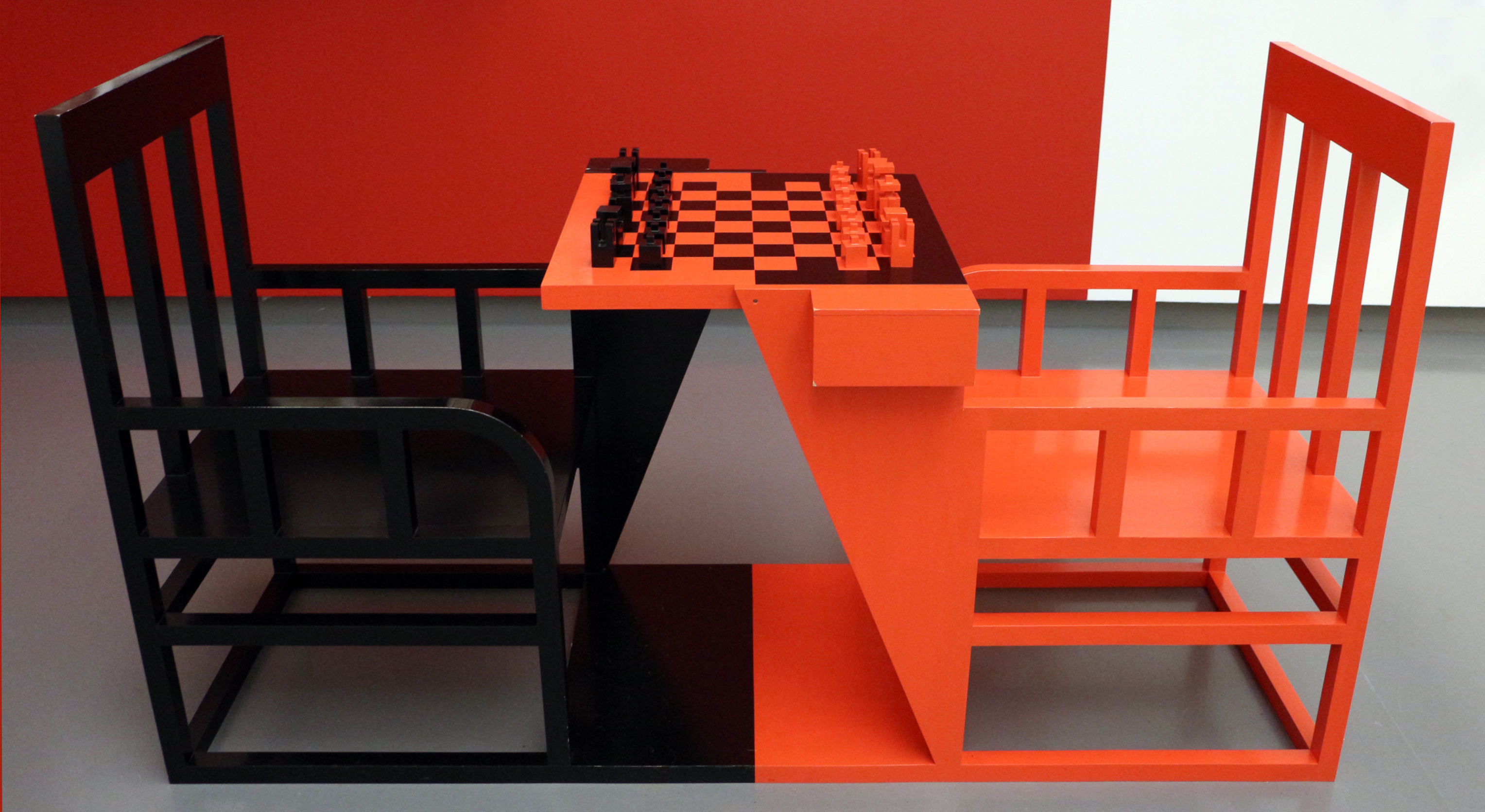
Alexander Rodchenko's constructivist design, 1925

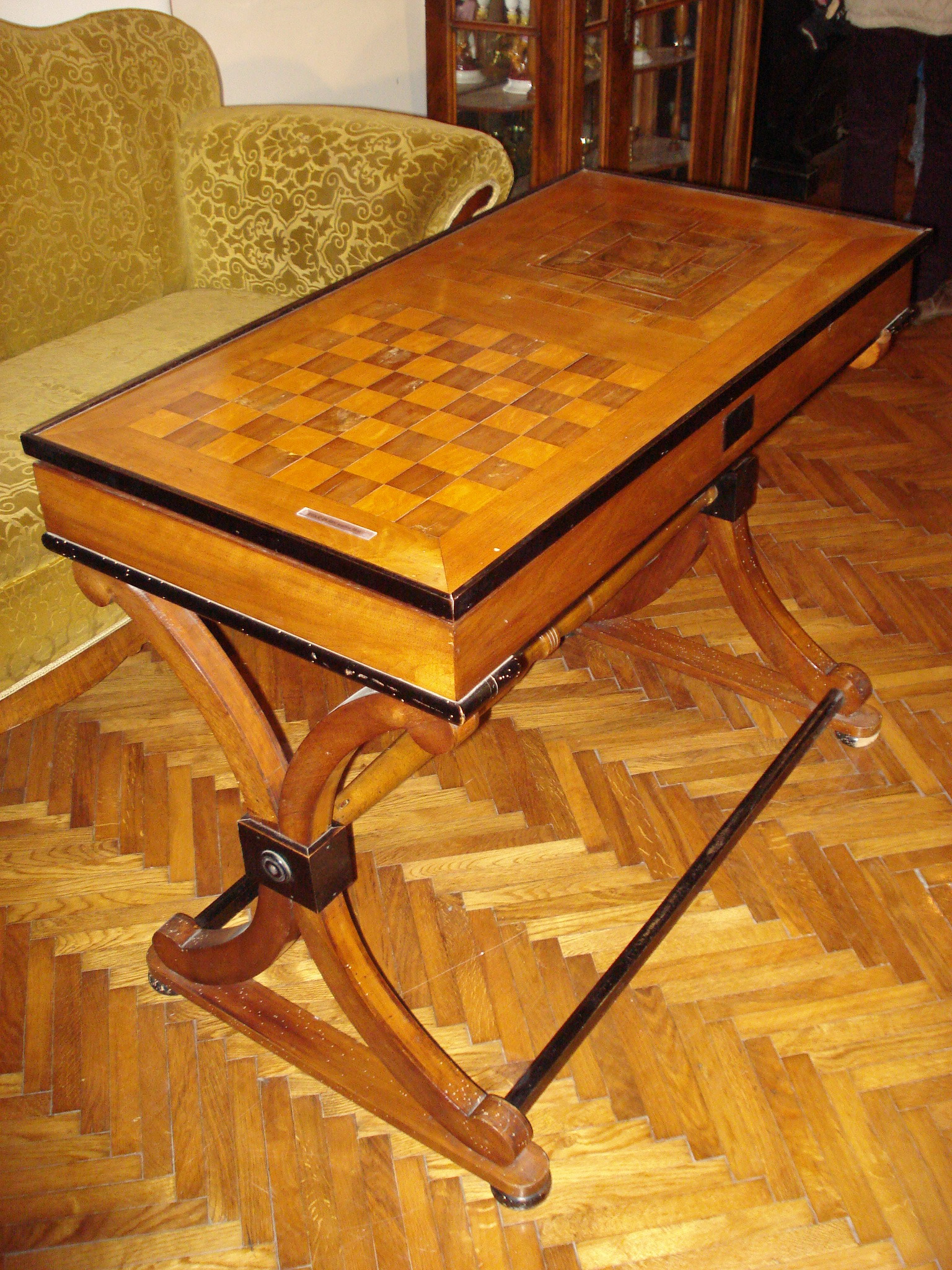
Combined chess and mill game table

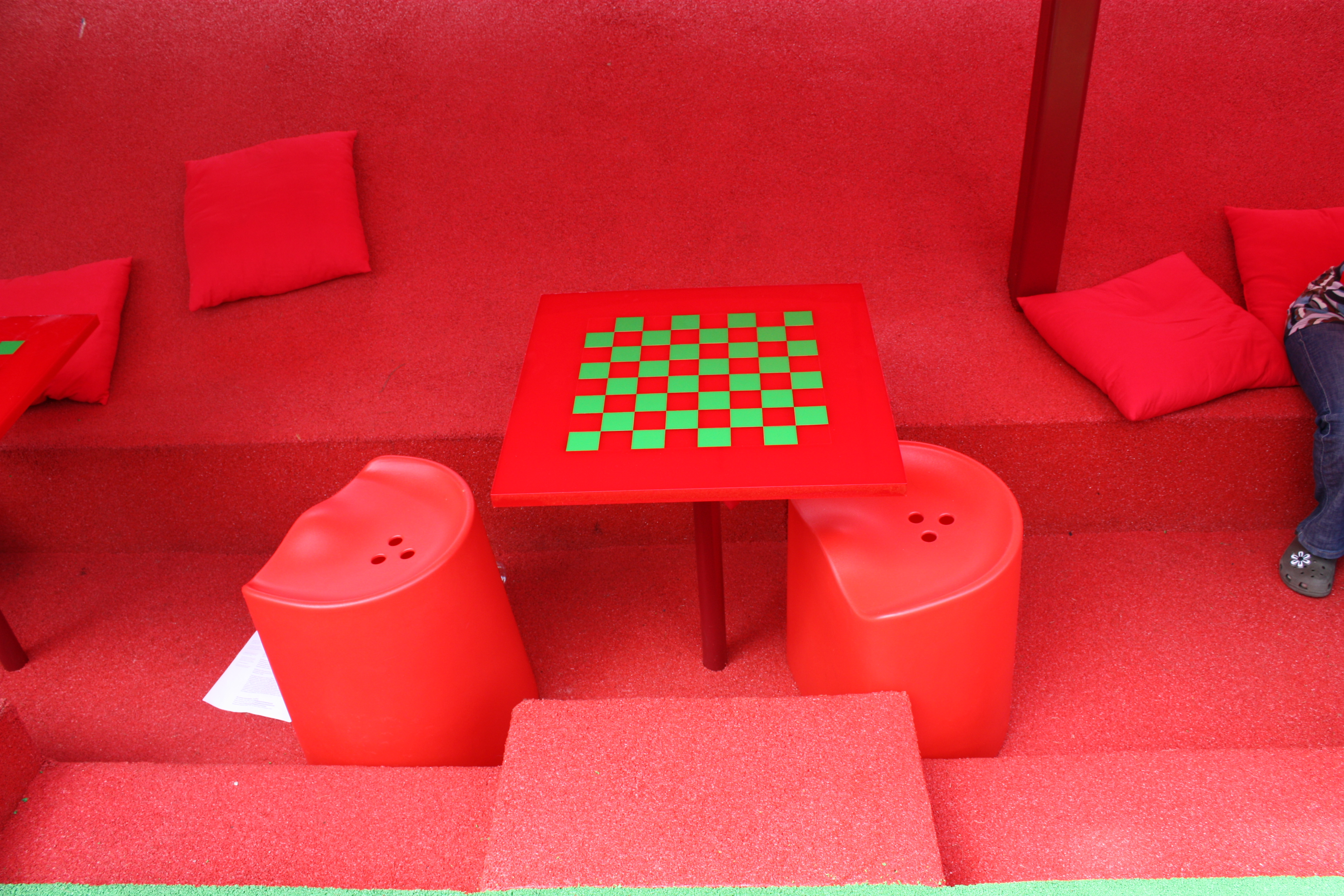
Colourful red and green chess table
