= Chess clock =

Two adjacent clocks with stop/start buttons

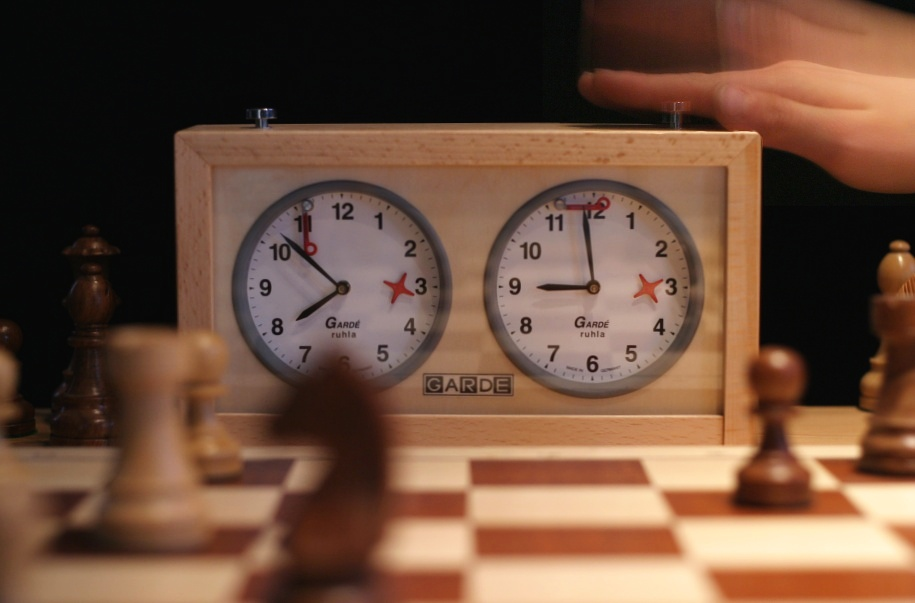
An analog chess clock

A chess clock is a device that comprises two adjacent clocks with buttons to stop one clock while starting the other, so that the two clocks never run simultaneously. The clocks are used in games where the time is allocated between two parties. The purpose is to keep track of the total time each party takes and prevent delays. Parties may take more or less time over any individual move.

Chess clocks were first used extensively in tournament chess, beginning with a competition at the London 1883 tournament. They are often called game clocks, as their use has since spread to tournament Scrabble, shogi, Go, and nearly every competitive two-player board game, as well as other types of games. Various designs exist for chess clocks and different methods of time control may be employed on the clocks, with "sudden death" being the simplest.

== Description ==
A chess clock consists of two adjacent clocks with buttons to stop one clock while starting the other, so that the two clocks never run simultaneously. The devices are used in chess and other two-player games where the players move in turn. The purpose is to keep track of the total time each player takes for their own moves, and ensure that neither player overly delays the game.

Invented by Thomas Bright Wilson of Manchester Chess Club, the clocks were first used during competition at the London 1883 tournament. Chess clocks were first used extensively in tournament chess, and are often called game clocks. Their use has since spread to tournament Scrabble, shogi, Go, checkers, and nearly every competitive two-player board game, as well as other types of games. They have also been used in some legal settings where each side or party is allotted a specific amount of time for arguments.

== Designs ==
=== Analog game clocks ===
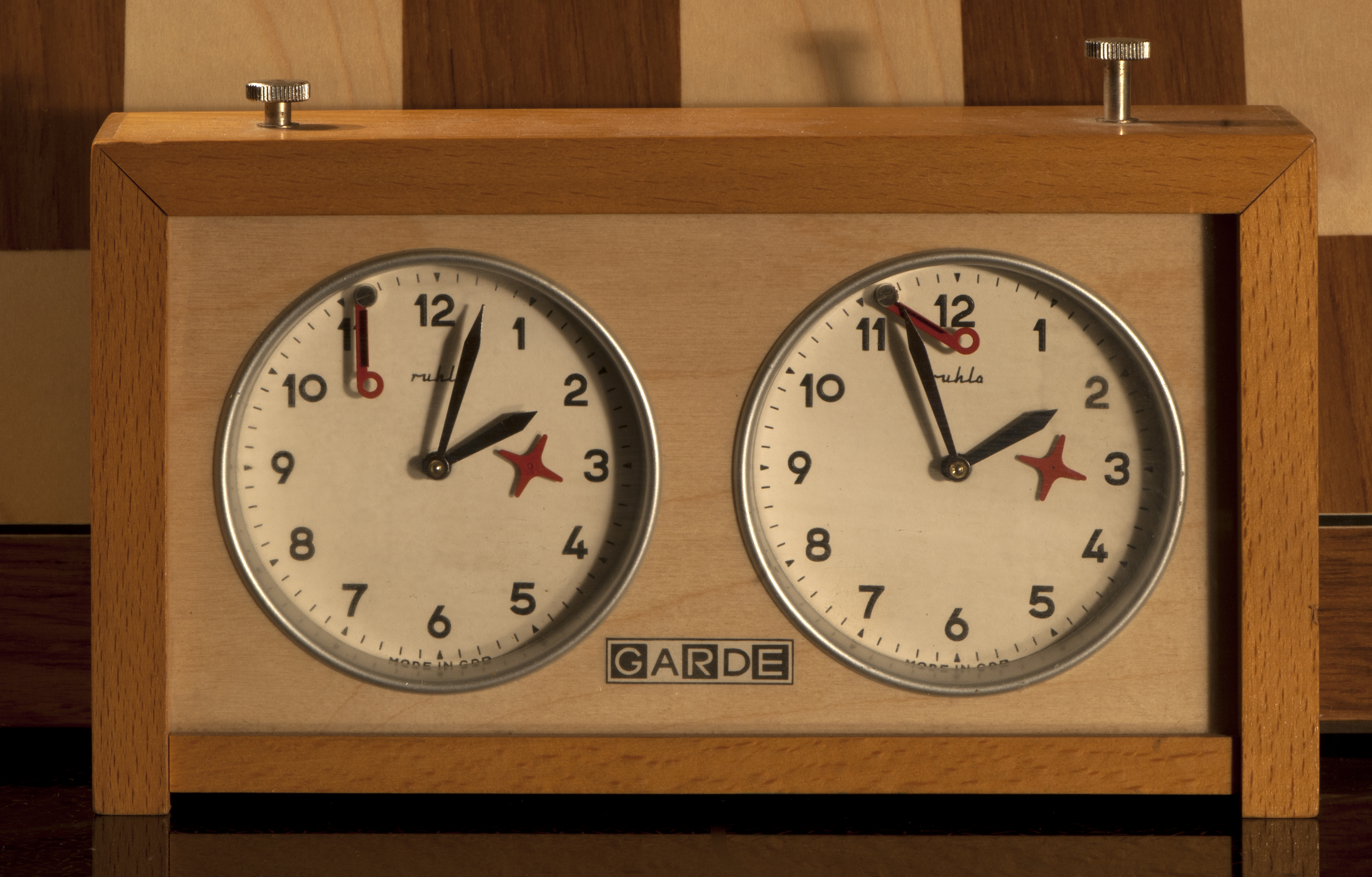
A typical analog chess clock

Analog clocks are equipped with a "flag" that falls to indicate the exact moment the player's time has expired. Analog clocks use mechanical buttons. Pressing the button on one player's side physically stops the movement of that player's clock and releases the hold on the opponent's.

The drawbacks of the mechanical clocks include accuracy and matching of the two clocks, and matching of the indicators (flags) of time expiration. Additional time cannot easily be added for more complex time controls, especially those that call for an increment or delay on every move, such as some forms of byoyomi.

=== Early development of digital game clocks ===
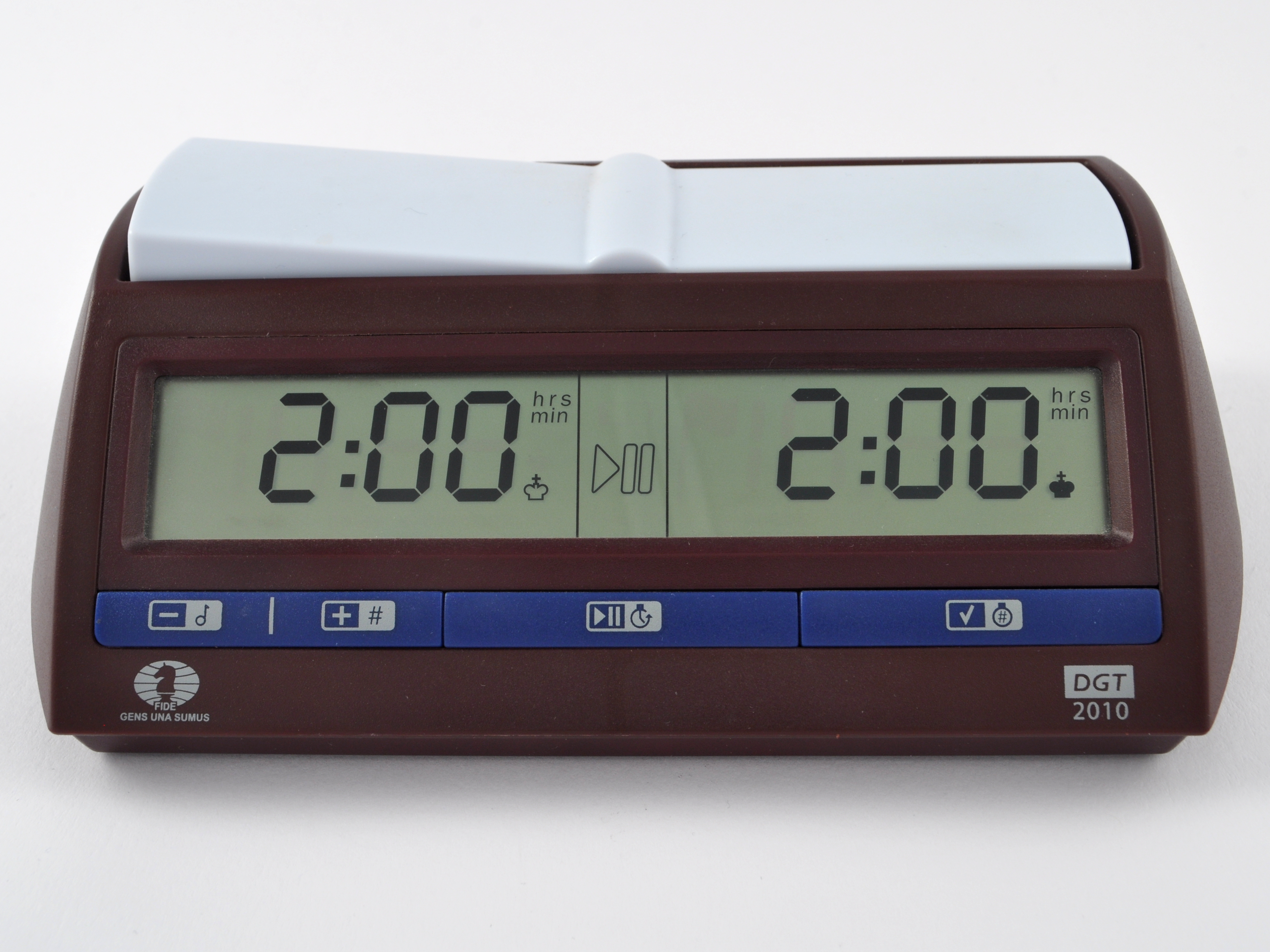
Digital chess clock

In 1973, to address the issues with analog clocks, Bruce Cheney, a Cornell University electrical engineering (EE) student and chess player, created the first digital chess clock as a project for an undergraduate EE course. Typical of most inventions, it was crude compared to the products on the market many years later and was limited by the technology that existed at the time. For example, the display was implemented via red LEDs, which required significant power and, as a result, the clock had to be plugged into a wall outlet. The high cost of LEDs at the time meant that only one set of digits could be displayed: that of the player whose turn it was to move. This meant that each player's time had to be multiplexed to the display when their time was running. In 1973, LSI chips were not readily or cheaply available, so all the multiplexing and logic was enabled using chips consisting of four two-input TTL NAND gates, resulting in excessive power consumption. Being plugged into the wall is obviously a major drawback, but had one advantage: the timebase for the clock was driven off a rectified version of the alternating current mains frequency. Each player had a separate counter and, in a parallel to the original mechanical architecture, one player's counter was disabled while the other's was running. The clock only had one mode: time ran forward. It could be reset, but not set. It did not count the number of moves. But it successfully addressed the original goals of the project (accurate and matched timing).

The first commercially available digital chess clock was patented in 1975 by Joseph Meshi and Jeffrey R. Ponsor. They named it the Micromate-80. There was only one made and this was tested by chess players in multiple tournaments. Three years later a much-improved Micromate-180 was produced alongside Meshi's MBA thesis, "Demand Analysis for a New Product (The Digital Chess Clock)", at San Diego State University, while Meshi and Ponsor continued to develop digital gaming.

=== Fischer clock and related designs ===
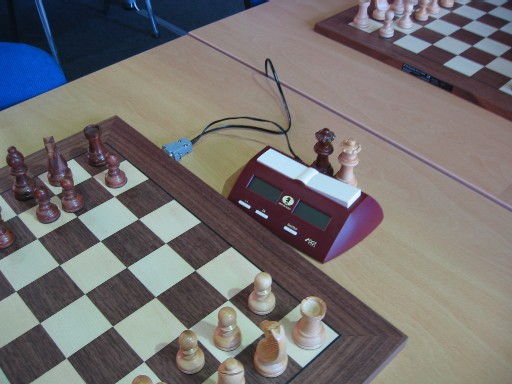
Digital chess clock connected to a board that automatically senses when moves have been made.

Digital clocks and Internet gaming have spurred a wave of experimentation with more varied and complex time controls than the traditional standards. Time control is commonly used in modern chess in many different methodologies. One particularly notable development, which has gained quite wide acceptance in chess, was proposed by former world champion Bobby Fischer, who in 1988 filed for US patent 4,884,255 (awarded in 1989) for a new type of digital chess clock. Fischer's digital clock gave each player a fixed period of time at the start of the game and then added a small amount after each move. Joseph Meshi called this "Accumulation" as it was a main feature of his patented Micromate-180 (US Patent 4,247,925 1978).

The increment time control was first used in the privately organised 1992 Fischer–Spassky match, and quickly became popular in the wider chess world, being subsequently used in the FIDE World Chess Championship 1998. Nowadays most top level tournaments and tournaments outside the United States use Fischer's system. An increasing number of lower level tournaments in the US are also starting to use Fischer's system. Other aspects of Fischer's patent, such as a synthesized voice announcing how much time the players have, thus eliminating the need for them to keep looking at the clock, have not been adopted.

On March 10, 1994, a patent application was filed by inventors Frank A. Camaratta Jr. of Huntsville, Alabama, and William Goichberg of Salisbury Mills, New York, for a game timer especially suitable for playing the game of chess, which employed a (simple) "delay" feature. The game timer provides, among other features, a user-definable delay between the time the activation button is pressed and the time that the activated clock actually begins to count down. United States Patent 5,420,830 was issued on May 10, 1995, and subsequently assigned to the United States Chess Federation by the inventors. As with the Fischer clock, the benefit of the delay clock is to reduce the likelihood that a player with positional or material superiority will lose a match solely because of the expiration of time on that player's time clock. In the United States, delay is still widely used, but increment is becoming more popular.

== Timing methods ==
Sudden death: The simplest time control is "sudden death", in which players must make a predetermined number of moves in a certain amount of time or forfeit the game immediately. A particularly popular variant is blitz chess, in which each player is given a short time, such as five minutes, on the clock in which to play the entire game.

X moves per Y minutes: in longer time control games, time control is usually specified in a certain number of moves in a certain time. Traditionally the first time control is at move 40. At the World Chess Championship 1986, for instance, the time control was 40 moves in 2½ hours, and 16 moves per hour thereafter. Sometimes, after a certain move, it reverts to sudden death; for instance, 90 minutes for the first 40 moves, then an extra 30 minutes for each player for the rest of the game (ensuring the maximum game length is 4 hours: 2 hours maximum for each player).

Increment (also known as Bonus and Fischer since former World Chess Champion Bobby Fischer patented this timing method): a specified amount of time is added to the player's main time each move, unless the player's main time ran out before they completed their move. For example, if the time control is 90+30 (ninety minutes of main time per player with a thirty-second increment each move), each player gets an additional thirty seconds added to their main time for each move, unless the player's main time ran out first. Under FIDE and US Chess rules, the increment is applied to the first move as well. For example, for 3+2 each player starts with three minutes and two seconds on the first move. Not all digital clocks automatically give the increment for move one and thus for those that don't, the increment time has to be added manually to the main time so each player gets the increment for move one.

Increment can also begin later than move 1. For instance, at the World Chess Championship 2024, the time control was 120 minutes per side for the first 40 moves, and an extra 30 minutes for the rest of the game, with a 30-second increment per move starting from move 41.

Bronstein delay (named after Grandmaster David Bronstein who invented this timing method): this timing method adds time but, unlike Increment, the maximum amount of time is not always added. If a player expends more than the specified delay then the entire delay is added to the player's clock, but if a player moves faster than the delay, only the exact amount of time expended by the player is added. For example, if the delay is ten seconds and a player uses ten or more seconds for a move, ten seconds is added after they complete their move. If the player uses five seconds for a move, five seconds is added after they complete their move. This ensures that the main time left on the clock can never increase even if a player makes fast moves. As with Increment, the delay time is applied to the first move under FIDE and US Chess rules.

Simple delay (also known as US delay): with this timing method, the clock waits for the delay period each move before the player's main time starts counting down. For example, if the delay is ten seconds, the clock waits for ten seconds each move before the main time starts counting down.

Bronstein delay and Simple delay are very similar, but not equal. Mathematically, Bronstein delay and Simple delay are identical; the amount of time allotted to each player is equivalent at all stages of the game. For this reason, the two delays are interchangeable in the FIDE laws of chess. In practice, however, Bronstein delay and Simple delay display time differently. In Bronstein delay, the amount of time is added after the move has been made; this distinction may be crucial when a player is running out of time.

The advantage of Bronstein delay is that a player can always quickly see exactly how much time they have for their next move without having to mentally add the main and delay time. The advantage of Simple delay is that a player can always tell whether the time that is counting down is the delay time or the main time. For example, in a game with a 5-second delay, when a player presses their clock with 1 second remaining, the clock will display with 1 second remaining, and the 5-second delay is counted separately on their next turn. In Bronstein, the 5 seconds are immediately added, and the clock will display 6 seconds. Simple delay is the form of delay most often used in the US, while Bronstein delay is the form of delay most often used in most other countries.

== See also ==
- Chess equipment
