= 1849 in the United Kingdom =

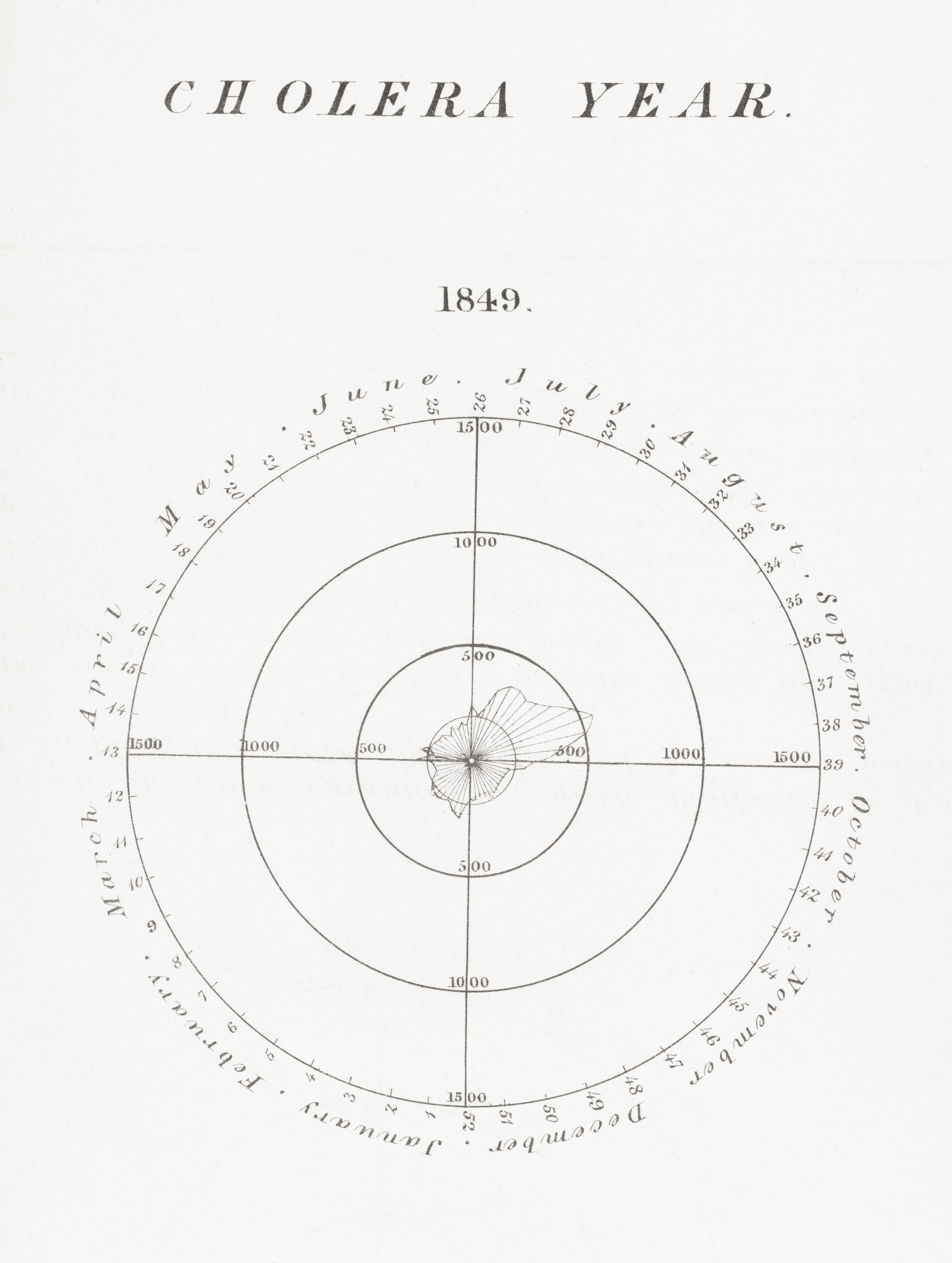
The data represented by the chart in this image is directly related to the section discussing the cholera outbreak in this time frame.

Events from the year 1849 in the United Kingdom.

== Incumbents ==
- Monarch – Victoria
- Prime Minister – Lord John Russell (Whig)
- Foreign Secretary – Henry John Temple, 3rd Viscount Palmerston

== Events ==
- 13 January – Second Anglo-Sikh War: British forces retreat from the Battle of Chillianwala.
- 22 January – Second Anglo-Sikh War: The city of Multan falls to the British East India Company following the Siege of Multan.
- February–May – Shareholder enquiries into the conduct of railway financier George Hudson begins his downfall.
- 1 February – Abolition of the Corn Laws by the Importation Act 1846 comes fully into effect.
- 17 February – 65 people, almost all under the age of 20, are crushed to death in a panic caused by a small fire in the Theatre Royal, Glasgow.
- 21 February – Second Anglo-Sikh War: Battle of Gujrat – British East India Company forces defeat those of the Sikh Empire in Punjab.
- 1 March – Nathaniel Cooke registers the design of the Staunton chess set, which is first marketed in September by Jaques of London with an endorsement by Howard Staunton.
- 3 March – The Arana-Southern Treaty with the Argentine Confederation ends British involvement in the Anglo-French blockade of the Río de la Plata.
- 30 March – The Second Anglo-Sikh War ends with the U.K. annexing the Punjab.
- 21 April – Great Famine (Ireland): 96 inmates of the overcrowded Ballinrobe Union Workhouse die over the course of the preceding week from illness and other famine-related conditions, a record high. This year's potato crop again fails and there are renewed outbreaks of cholera.
- May – First exhibition of paintings by the Pre-Raphaelite Brotherhood in London: John Everett Millais' Isabella and Holman Hunt's Rienzi at the Royal Academy summer exhibition, and Dante Gabriel Rossetti's Girlhood of Mary Virgin at the Free Exhibition on Hyde Park Corner.
- 19 May – Irishman William Hamilton arrested after shooting blank shots at Queen Victoria on Constitution Hill, London.
- 26 June – Navigation Acts repealed.
- Summer
  - The Buckinghamshire Assizes are removed from Buckingham to Aylesbury.
  - Karl Marx moves from Paris to London, where he will spend the remainder of his life.
- 2–12 August – Visit of Queen Victoria to Cork, Dublin and Belfast.
- 9 August – "The Bermondsey Horror": Swiss-born Marie Manning and her husband murder her lover Patrick O'Connor in London. On 13 November, they are hanged together publicly before a large crowd by William Calcraft outside Horsemonger Lane Gaol for the crime.
- 13 December – A foundation stone of Llandovery College is laid.
- 17 December – A customer, probably Edward Coke, collects the first bowler hat (devised by London hatmakers Thomas and William Bowler) from hatters Lock & Co. of St James's.

=== Undated ===
- Two shilling coin (florin), depicting the Queen crowned, introduced, partly to test public opinion on possible decimalization of the currency.
- Bedford College (London) founded by Elizabeth Jesser Reid as the Ladies College in Bedford Square, a non-sectarian higher education institution to provide a liberal female education.
- The drapers' store of Arthur & Fraser, predecessor of the House of Fraser, is established in Glasgow by Hugh Fraser and James Arthur.

=== Ongoing ===
- The 1846–1860 cholera pandemic claims 52,000 lives in England and Wales between 1848 and 1850.

== Publications ==
- Charlotte Brontë's novel Shirley (published as by Currer Bell, 28 October).
- Thomas De Quincey's essay The English Mail-Coach (in Blackwood's Edinburgh Magazine, October–December).
- Charles Dickens' novel David Copperfield begins serialisation (May).
- J. A. Froude's controversial novel of religious doubt The Nemesis of Faith.
- John Ruskin's essay The Seven Lamps of Architecture (May).
- Notes and Queries first published (November).
- Who's Who first published.

== Births ==
- 13 February – Lord Randolph Churchill, statesman (died 1895)
- 22 May – Aston Webb, architect (died 1930)
- 11 July
  - N. E. Brown, English plant taxonomist (died 1934)
  - Rollo Russell, son to the serving Prime Minister (died 1914)
- 24 November – Frances Hodgson Burnett, author (died 1924)
- 29 November – John Ambrose Fleming, electrical engineer and inventor (died 1945)

== Deaths ==
- 9 January – William Siborne, Army officer and military historian (born 1797)
- 19 February – Bernard Barton, poet (born 1784)
- 20 March – James Justinian Morier, diplomat and novelist (born 1780)
- 22 May – Maria Edgeworth, novelist (born 1767)
- 25 May – Sir Benjamin D'Urban, general and colonial administrator (born 1777)
- 28 May – Anne Brontë, author (born 1820)
- 30 June – William Ward, cricketer (born 1787)
- 12 July – Horace Smith, poet (born 1779)
- 31 August – Peter Allan of Marsden, eccentric (born 1799)
- 6 September – Edward Stanley, Bishop of Norwich (born 1779)
- 16 September – Thomas Jones, missionary (born 1810)
- 20 October – Richard Ryan, biographer (born 1797)
- 13 November – William Etty, painter (born 1787)
- 27 November – Henry Seymour (Knoyle), politician (born 1776)
- 2 December – Adelaide of Saxe-Meiningen, queen dowager of William IV (born 1792)
- 12 December – Sir Marc Isambard Brunel, engineer (born 1769 in France)
