= British Chess Company =

Chess piece manufacturer

The British Chess Company (BCC) was founded by William Moffatt (1843–1918) and William Hughes and began manufacturing chess pieces in 1891.

== Chess sets ==
The BCC was an attempt to compete against Jaques of London. The BCC developed new manufacturing processes with new types of materials, such as Xylonite for their chess pieces. In 1891, the BCC registered the design for two of their chess sets: (1) Royal Chessmen; (2) Imperial Staunton. Both the 'Royal' and 'Imperial' were made in boxwood and ebony. Also they offered a very rare (3) Royal Chessmen 'Presentation Set' which was made of metal. The pieces were skilfully turned in German silver for the light colour, and in gilding metal for the dark. Only full club size 1 was available for the handsome sum of £12 12s.

== See also ==
- Jaques of London
