= Jaques of London =

Manufactures of sports and game equipment

Coordinates: 51°12′23.97″N 0°3′45.12″E

Jaques of London, formerly known as John Jaques of London and Jaques and Son of London, is a long-established British family company that manufactures sports and game equipment.

== History ==
Dating itself from 1795 when Thomas Jaques, a farmer's son of French Huguenot descent, set up as a "Manufacturer of Ivory, Hardwoods, Bone, and Tunbridge Ware", the company gained a reputation for publishing games under his grandson John Jaques the younger.

Jaques is said to have been instrumental in the invention and popularisation of Croquet. The family lore is that "John Jaques II ... was a friend of Lewis Carroll [and] ‘Carroll was one of the founding members of the croquet club at Oxford University’", according to Joe Jaques, a descendent of the founder, who goes on to explain that, "It is no surprise that croquet is in Alice in Wonderland because Lewis Carroll was a family friend and we had commissioned the illustrator Sir John Tenniel, who went on to illustrate Alice in Wonderland, to draw the original Happy Families characters when he was a cheap jobbing illustrator in 1851. It is all connected. Carroll’s niece Irene Dodgson then married my great-grandfather John Jaques III."

The popularity of chess during World War II helped MI9 hide items in chess games sent to British and American prisoners of war, because the chess sets were made of wood, especially the Staunton chess sets by Jaques of London. The inside walls of the chess pieces box were hollowed out "...to secrete maps, currency, documents, hacksaw blades and swinger compasses." The large chess boards were perfect for supplying to prisoners "...counterfeit documents, maps, currency and other contraband." The chess pieces themselves were hollowed out and used to hold messages, compasses, maps and dye to help turn uniforms into civilian attire. The base of the piece was often screwed in with a left turn screw, so any attempt to unscrew the base normally would only make it tighter.

The company moved its offices and showroom to Edenbridge, Kent, in 2000.

== Staunton chessmen ==
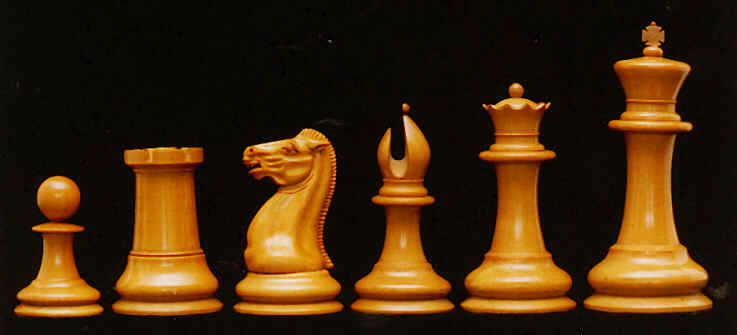
Staunton chess set designed by Nathaniel Cooke for Jaques of London, 1849.

The Staunton chess set was released in 1849 by Jaques of London of Hatton Garden in London. The pieces were designed to be easy to use and universally recognized by chess players of diverse backgrounds. It became known as the Staunton chess set after Howard Staunton (1810–1874), the chess player and writer who was generally considered the strongest player in the world from 1843 to 1851. The journalist Nathaniel Cooke whose daughter later married into the Jaques family registered the design in March 1849 before the set was manufactured and launched under Howard Staunton's name.

== Products ==
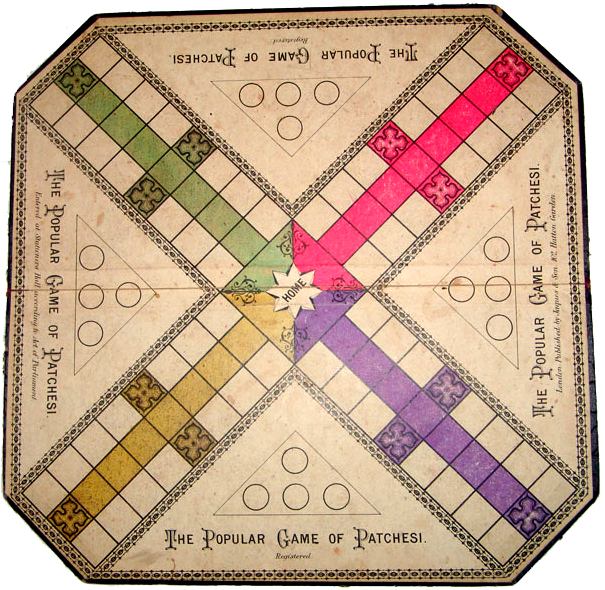
A Jaques and Son Parcheesi/Ludo board

- Chess – Jaques had exclusive manufacturing rights for a chess set designed by Nathaniel Cooke in 1849 and named the Staunton chess set after Howard Staunton. This set later became the official international standard.
- Clock golf – Jaques assert that they originated the game in the mid 19th century.
- Croquet – played an important role in popularising the game, producing editions of the rules in 1857, 1860, and 1864.
- Happy Families – popular card game, developed in 1851.
- Icosian game – a mathematical puzzle involving cycles on a dodecahedron, invented by W. R. Hamilton and published by Jaques and Son in 1859.
- Ludo – patented in England in 1897.
- Shove ha'penny – a pub game in the shuffleboard family, played predominantly in the United Kingdom.
- Snakes and Ladders – the first publishers starting in 1888.
- Table tennis – pioneered under the names Gossima and later Ping Pong.
- Reversi – the first publishers starting in 1888.
- Tiddledy-Winks – the first publishers starting in 1888.

== See also ==
- British Chess Company

== Sources ==
- Edmonds, David; Eidinow, John (2004). Bobby Fischer Goes to War: How the Soviets Lost the Most Extraordinary Chess Match of All Time. HarperCollins Publishers Inc. ISBN 0-06-051024-2.
