= Nathaniel Cooke =

19th century English editor, publisher, and designer of the Staunton chess set

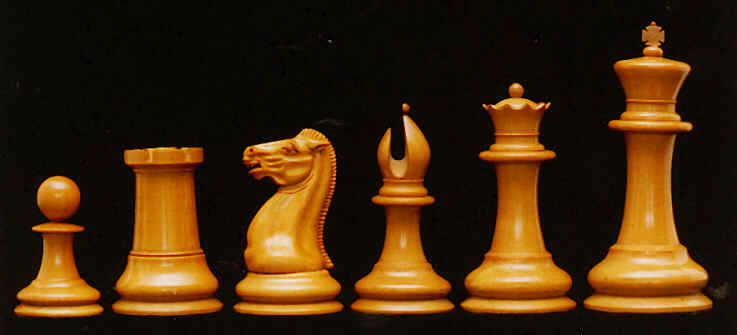
Chess pieces of Nathaniel Cooke's 1849 "Staunton" design

Nathaniel Cooke was the English designer of a set of chess figures called the Staunton chess set which became the most commonly used chess set worldwide in chess tournaments.

== Chess set ==
Cooke registered his design at the United Kingdom Patent Office on 1 March 1849 under the Ornamental Designs Act 1842. Cooke was the editor of The Illustrated London News, the newspaper where Howard Staunton wrote a regular chess column. Cooke asked Staunton to advertise his chess set. Staunton did so in his column on 8 September 1849, and the set became famous under the name Staunton rather than Cooke.

== Other businesses ==
In addition, Cooke was an ambitious London-based publisher who, as Ingram, Cooke & Co., produced many volumes of history, travel guides, and other works. Ingram and Cooke were the proprietors of the mid-Victorian National Illustrated Library that failed in 1854 due to carrying an excess number of titles:

When the National Illustrated Library was started, all were pleased and surprised at the appearance and price of the volumes, and it is certain that they would have paid; but a fatal error was made, almost at once, in commencing the publishing of other libraries at the same office, and in the purchasing at high prices old plates for republication; so many series came from the publisher ... that their advertisements were confusion worse confounded, and everybody was lost in the maze. The proprietor has now given up the business, not without a very serious loss.

== Family tragedy ==
Herbert Ingram, Cooke's brother-in-law and publishing house partner, was the co-founder of The Illustrated London News. Herbert Ingram died in a maritime accident while travelling in the United States with his son. His steamer, the Lady Elgin, sank in Lake Michigan when another passenger steamer, the Augusta, crashed into the Lady Elgin.

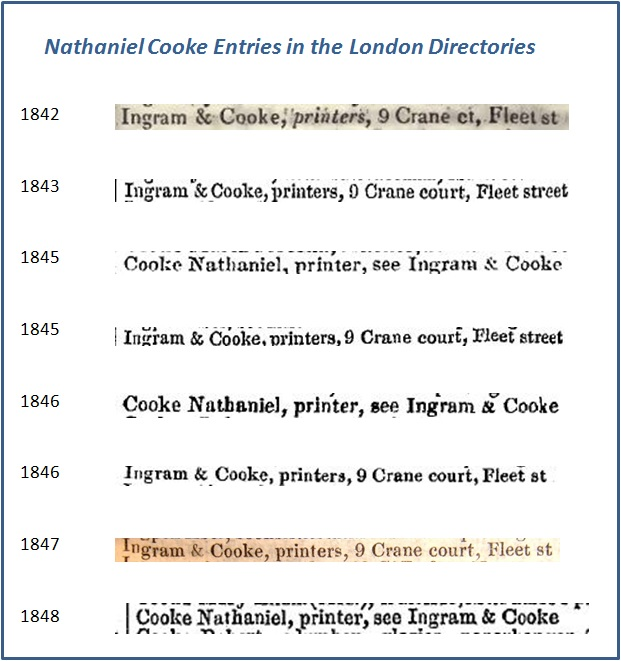
Nathaniel Cooke's listings in the London Directories

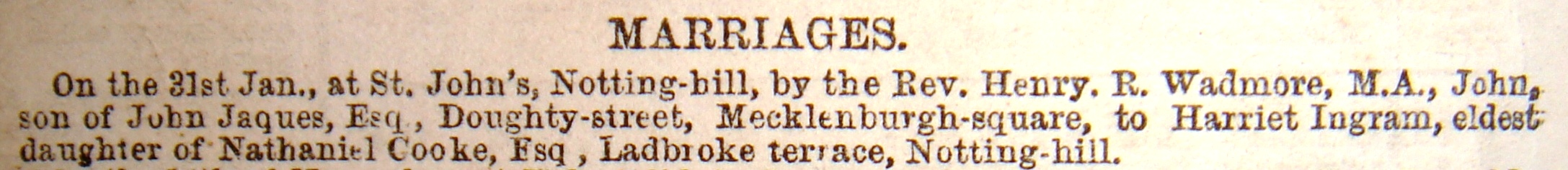
Marriage announcement in The Illustrated London News, 31 January 1860

Of the Lady Elgin's 400 passengers, only 100 survived. The accident occurred near Winetka, Illinois, during an early September storm.

== Spelling ==
Cooke's name was misspelled as "Cook" on the 1849 patent and the misspelling has propagated in chess literature since then. The correct spelling can be found in numerous documents, including his business listings in the London Directories (see top picture, right) as well as official announcements of the marriage of his daughter Harriet Ingram Cooke, to John Jaques II, son of John Jaques, the owner of the company that first manufactured the Staunton pieces in 1849 (see bottom picture, right).
