= Staunton chess set =

Chess set used for competitive play

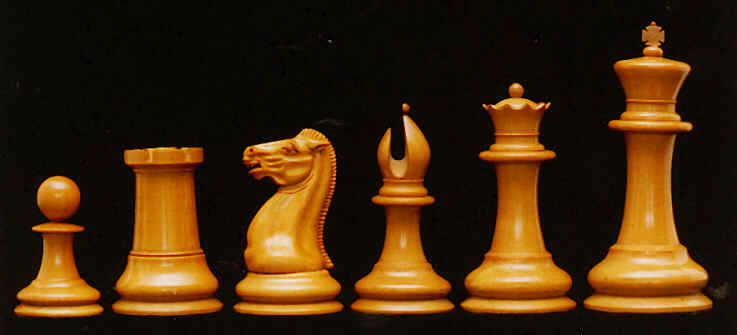
Staunton design chess pieces Left to right: pawn, rook, knight, bishop, queen, and king

The Staunton chess set is the standard style of chess pieces, recommended for use in competition since 2022 by FIDE, the international chess governing body.

The English journalist Nathaniel Cooke is credited with the design on the patent, and the design is named after the leading English chess master Howard Staunton, who endorsed it; the first 500 sets were numbered and hand-signed by Staunton. This style of set was first made available by Jaques of London in 1849, and it quickly became the standard. The set style and its variations have been used around the world since.

== Background ==
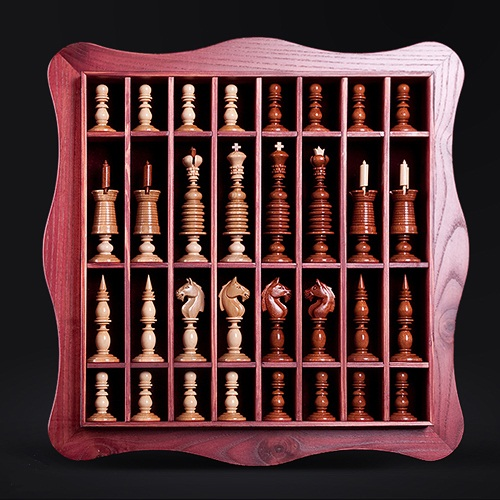
An English Barleycorn-style set

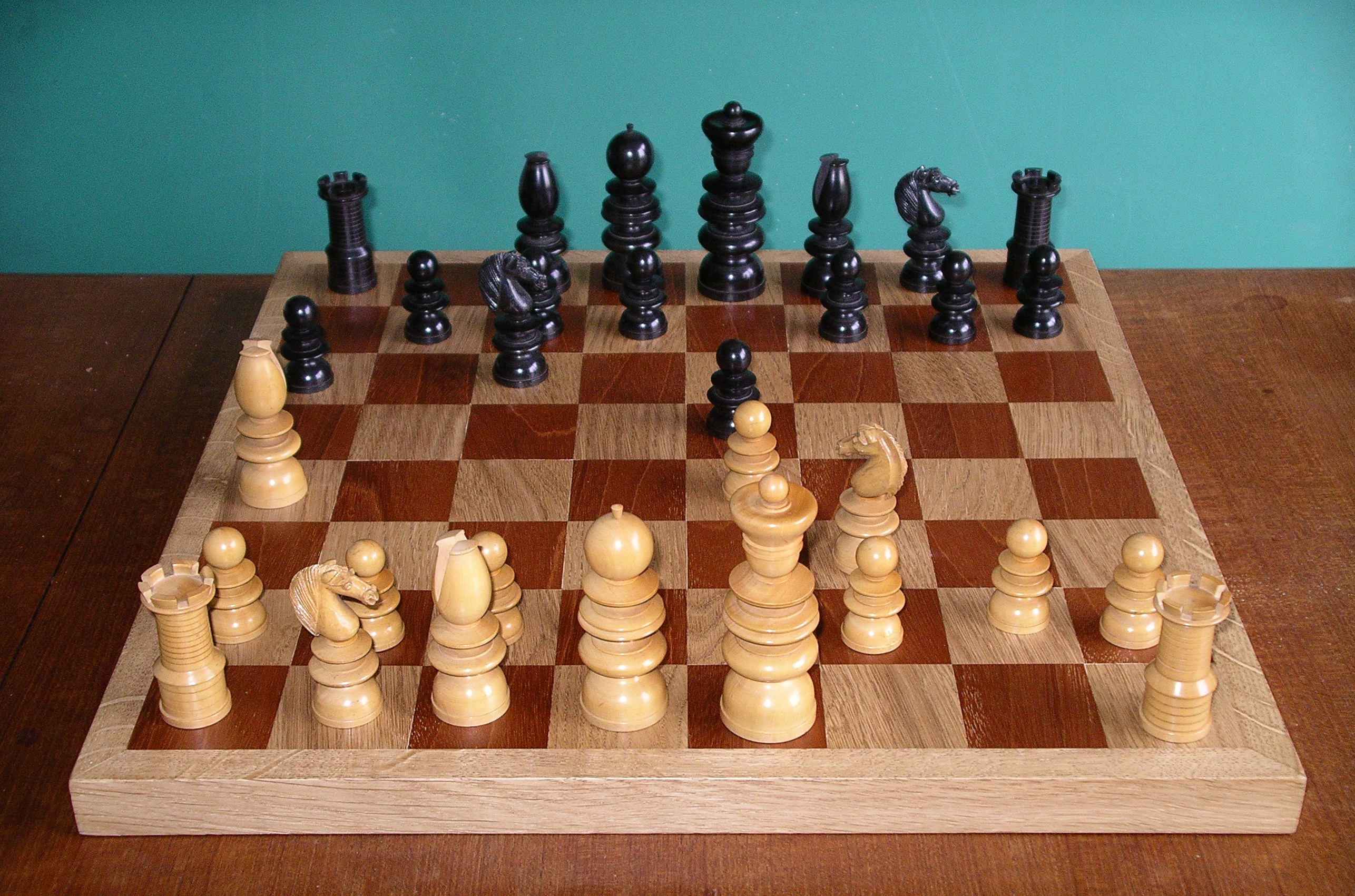
A St. George-style set

During the late 18th century and early 19th century, the increased interest in the game of chess, particularly in international play, brought about a renewed demand for a more universal model for chess pieces. The variety and styles of the conventional form, which began in the 15th century, had expanded tremendously by the beginning of the 19th century. Conventional types popular during the period included the English Barleycorn chess set, the St. George chess set, the French Regence chess set (named after the Café de la Régence in Paris), and the central European forms.

The Staunton chess set was released in 1849 in response to these issues. The pieces were designed to be easy to use and universally recognised by chess players of diverse backgrounds. It was first released by the purveyors of fine games, John Jaques of London, sport and games manufacturers, of Hatton Garden in London. It became known as the Staunton chess set after Howard Staunton (1810–1874), the chess player and writer who was generally considered the strongest player in the world from 1843 to 1851. Nathaniel Cooke has long been credited with the design.

One theory of the development of the set is that Cooke had used prestigious architectural concepts, familiar to an expanding class of educated and prosperous gentry. London architects, strongly influenced by the culture of Greece and the culture of ancient Rome, were designing prestigious buildings in the neoclassical style. The appearance of the new chessmen was based on this style, and the pieces were symbols of "respectable" Victorian society:

- A bishop distinguished by a mitre
- A queen's coronet and king's crown
- A knight carved in the form of a stallion's head, from the Elgin Marbles of the Parthenon
- A rook streamlined into clean classical lines, projecting an aura of strength and security
- The Staunton pawn follows a simple traditional design of a cone capped with a knob, but elaborated in the style of a Victorian architecture balcony.

There were also practical innovations: A crown emblem was stamped onto a rook and knight of each side to identify their positioning on the king's side of the board. This was because, in descriptive chess notation, the rooks and knights were often designated by being the "queen's knight", the "king's rook", etc.

Another possibility is that Jaques, a master turner, had probably been experimenting with a design that not only would be accepted by players but also could be produced at a reasonable cost. In the end, he most likely borrowed and synthesized elements from sets already available to create a new design that used universally recognisable symbols atop conventional stems and bases: The resulting pieces were compact, well balanced, and weighted to provide an understandable, practical playing set.

It may have been a combination of both theories with the synergy of Cooke the entrepreneur and Jaques the artisan.

From 1820 on, diagrams in chess books began to use icons of chess pieces similar in many respects to the Staunton chessmen, including a change from arched crown to coronet for the queen. This shows that the Staunton design may have been taken from these diagrams, very likely created by a printer.

== Design ==
The ebony and boxwood sets were weighted with lead to provide added stability and the underside of each piece was covered with felt, allowing the pieces to slide easily across the board. Some ivory sets were made from African ivory. The king sizes ranged from 3½ to 4½ inches (88 to 114 millimeters) and the sets typically came in a papier-mâché case, each one bearing a facsimile of Staunton's signature under the lid.

The Staunton pieces broadly resemble columns with a wide molded base. Knights feature the sculpted head and neck of a horse. Kings, the tallest pieces, top the column with a stylised crown topped with a cross pattée. Queens are slightly smaller than kings, and feature a coronet topped with a tiny ball (a monde). Rooks feature stylised crenellated battlements and bishops a Western-style mitre. Pawns are the smallest and are topped by a plain ball. Pieces representing human characters (the king, queen, bishop, and pawn) have a flat disk separating the body from the head design, which is known as a collar.

A modified Staunton chess set, described in the FIDE Laws of Chess, is used for the blind and visually impaired. In such a set, the black pieces are differentiated from the white pieces by a small point/spike atop the pieces, and the dark squares are raised above the light squares to allow the user to feel the board and pieces to understand the position. Furthermore, each square has a hole into which pegs on the bottom of each piece are inserted, allowing the user to feel the position of the pieces without moving them or knocking them over.

== Patent ==
The design was registered at the Patent Office on 1 March 1849, to Nathaniel Cooke, 198 Strand, London, England as an Ornamental Design for a set of Chess-Men, under the Ornamental Designs Act of 1842. At that date, there was no provision for the registration of any design or articles of ivory; registration was limited to Class 2, articles chiefly made of wood.

== Marketing ==
Cooke was the editor for the Illustrated London News, where Staunton published chess articles. He convinced the champion to endorse the chess set.

The "Staunton Chess-men." – We have lately been favoured with a sight of the newly-designed Chess-men you speak of, and shall be greatly mistaken if, in a very short time, these beautiful pieces do not entirely supersede the ungainly, inexpressive ones we have been hitherto contented with. In the simplicity and elegance of their form, combining apparent lightness with real solidity, in the nicety of their proportions one with another, so that in the most intricate positions every piece stands out distinctively, neither hidden nor overshadowed by its fellows, the "Staunton Chess-men" are incomparably superior to any others we have ever seen.

— Illustrated London News, 8 September 1849.

Staunton not only endorsed the product for Jaques of London but promoted it to an extraordinary degree including the lambasting and derision of any other design of chessmen then proposed. The Staunton, as it became known, became available to the general public on 29 September 1849. The Staunton style was soon the standard on which most tournament playing pieces have been made and used around the world ever since. The low cost of the Staunton set allowed the masses to purchase sets and helped to popularise the game of chess.

Staunton chess sets always had a cross on top of the king and the bishop's mitre design. These two aspects make it a Christianised chess set. Therefore, in non-Christian or socialist countries such as Yugoslavia and the Soviet Union, other designs were preferred or the Staunton design was altered to be without religious symbols. For example, the Dubrovnik chess set from Yugoslavia used in the 1950 World Chess Olympiad, Fischer's favourite set, was purposely designed to be without religious symbols. Similarly, many Soviet chess sets such as Latvian and Baku designs did not have the king's cross or bishop's mitre.

== Variants ==
There are 17 recognised variants derived from the original 1849 Staunton chess set, sorted by date:

1. Leuchars chess set (1849)
2. Cooke chess set (1849–50)
3. Wedgewood chess set (1849)
4. Morphy chess set (1851) – characterised by "Morphy" knights, which have more pronounced jowls than other designs
5. Harrwitz chess set (1852–1855)
6. Paulsen chess set (1853–1855)
7. Anderssen chess set (1855–1865)
8. Steinitz chess set (1865–1870)
9. Tarrasch chess set (1870–1875)
10. Zukertort chess set (1875–1880)
11. Lasker chess set (1880–1885)
12. Pre-Hartston chess set (1885–1890)
13. Hartston chess set (1890–1900)
14. Marshall chess set (1900–1915)
15. Nimzovitch chess set (1927–1937)
16. Broadbent chess set (1925–1937)
17. Lessing chess set (1927–1937)

== Modern times ==
The Staunton chess set has proven to be extremely popular and is likely to remain so in the future. The design is successful because of its well-balanced and easily recognised pieces. It is currently the official standard for tournament chess pieces. Anthony Saidy and Norman Lessing wrote that, "if a vote were taken among chess-players as to which pieces they most enjoyed playing with, there can be no doubt that the Staunton chessmen would win by an overwhelming margin. They are invariably used in major chess tournaments. No self-respecting chess club would be without them. They afford the most pleasing combination of utility and aesthetic appeal."

Wooden Staunton chess sets were often turned on a lathe, then non-circular details were added by hand; the knights were made in two parts (head and base) which were stuck together with adhesive.

A modern Staunton set, in plastic

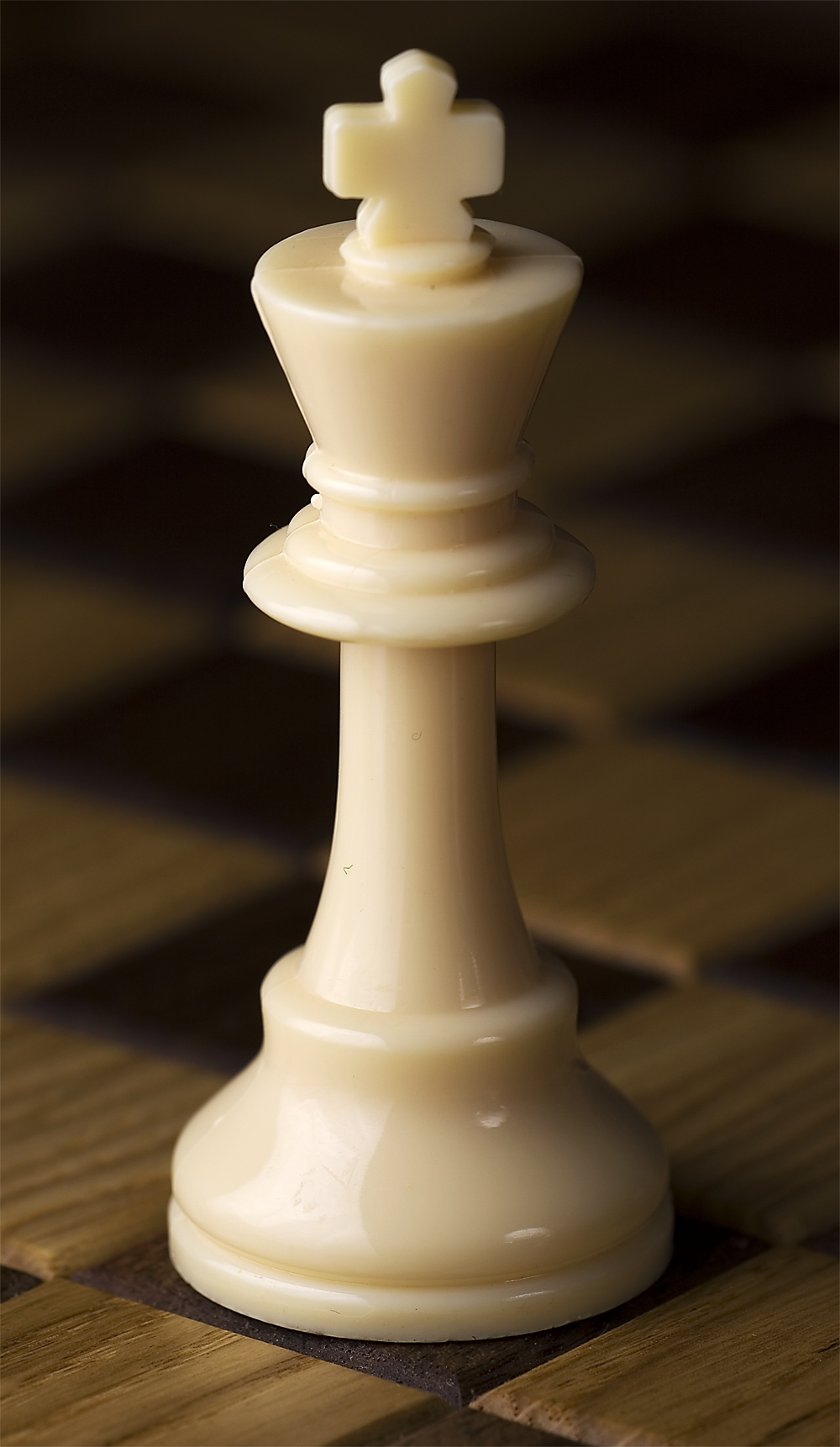
White king

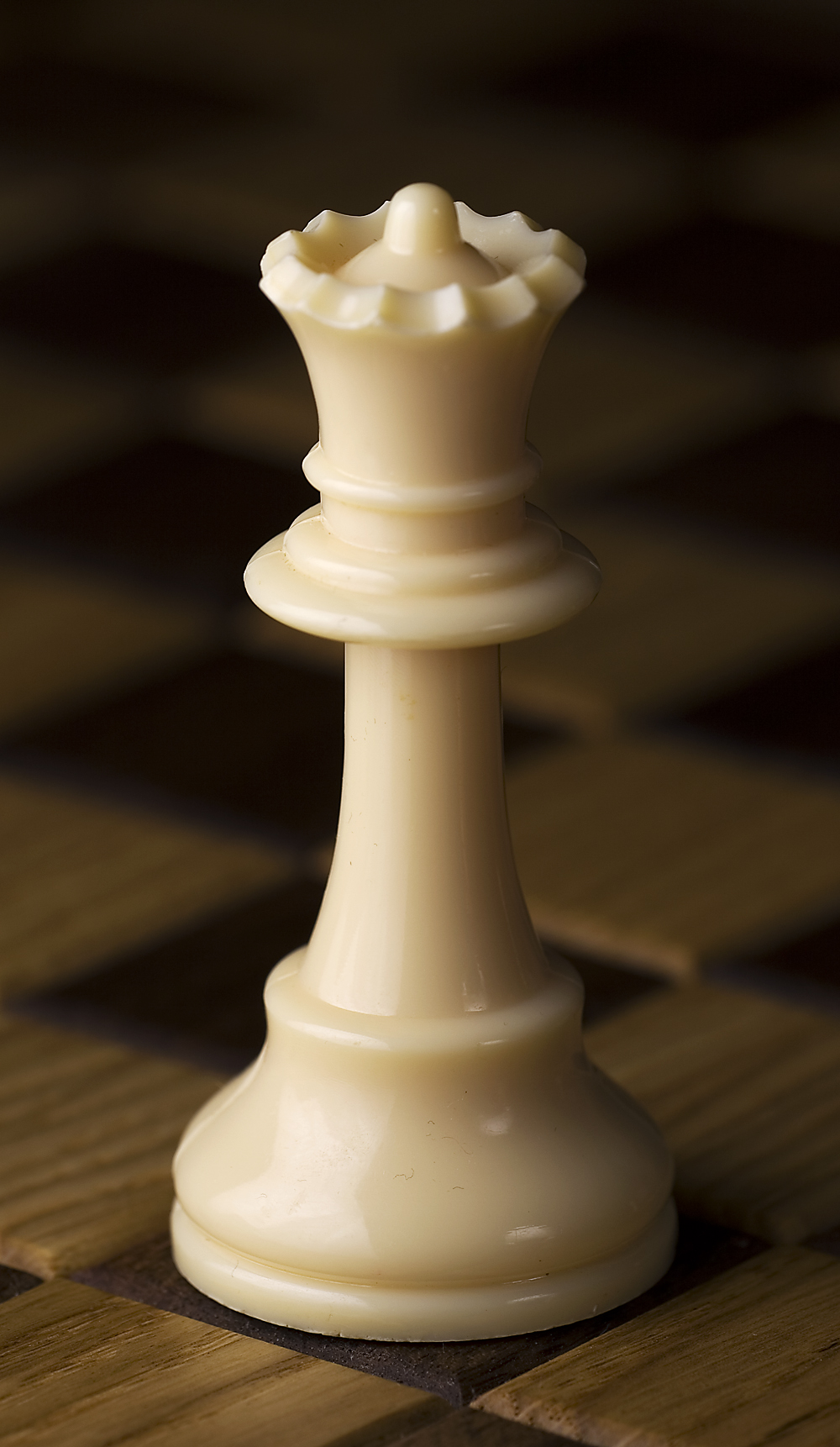
White queen

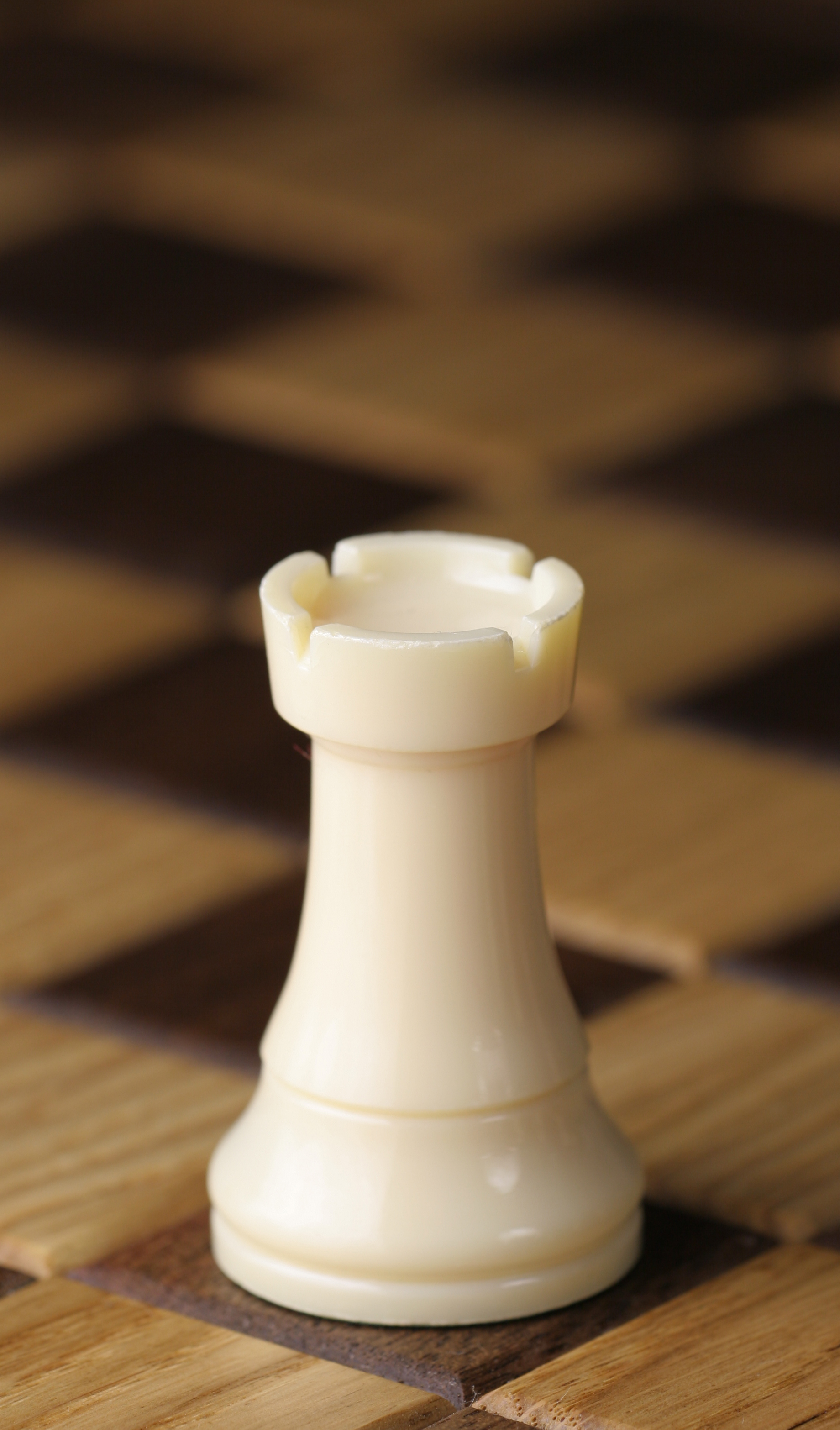
White rook

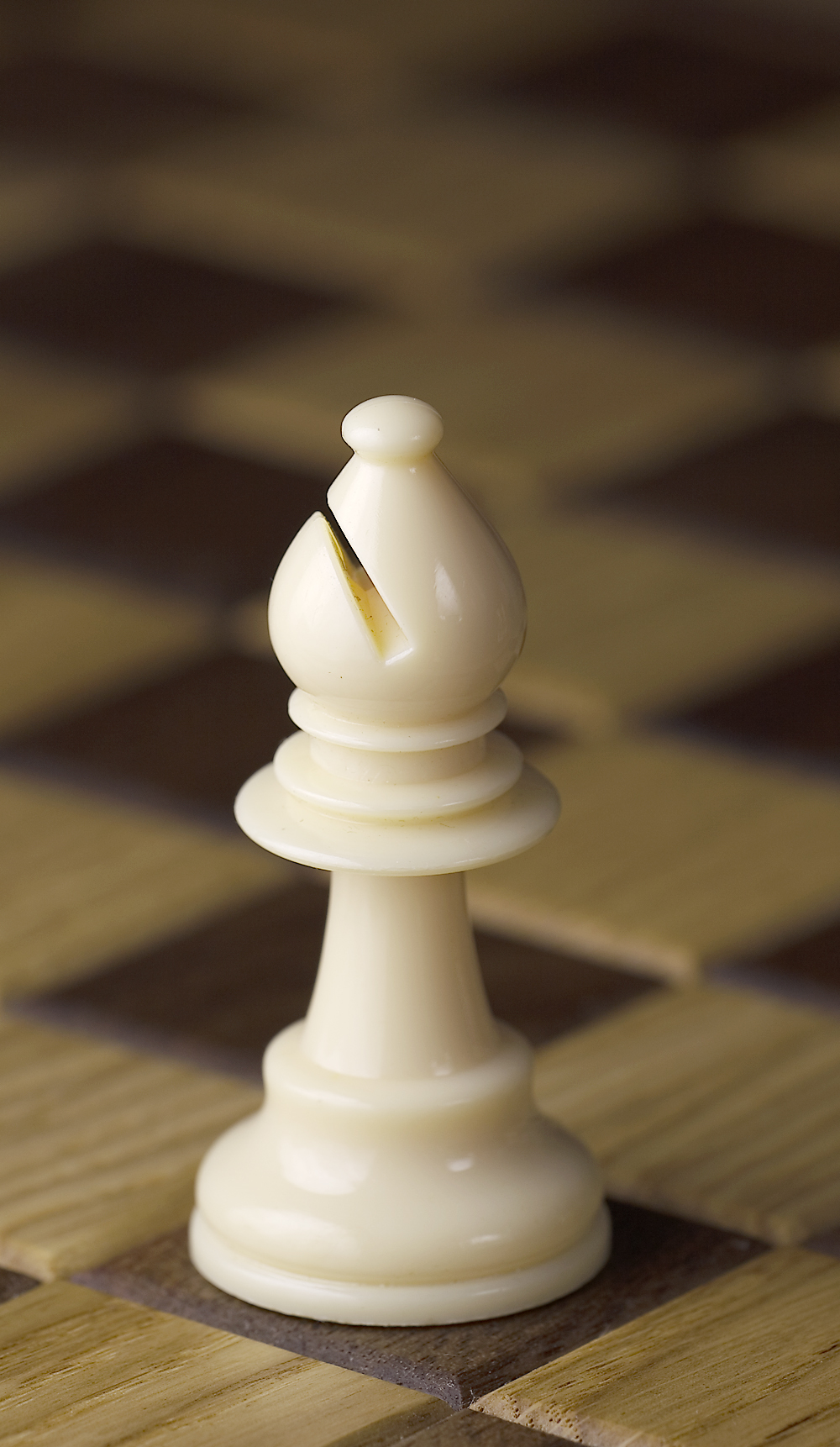
White bishop

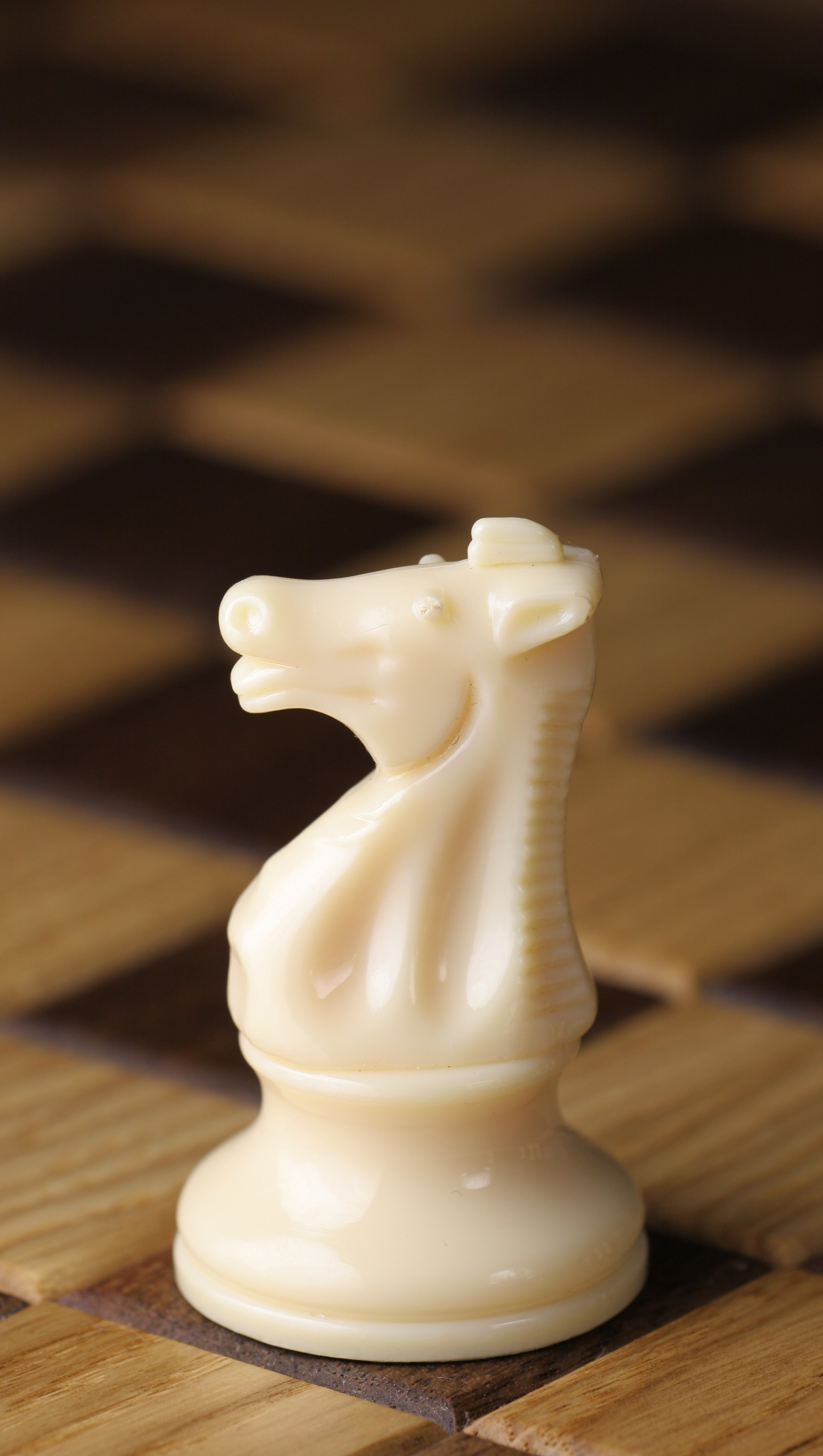
White knight

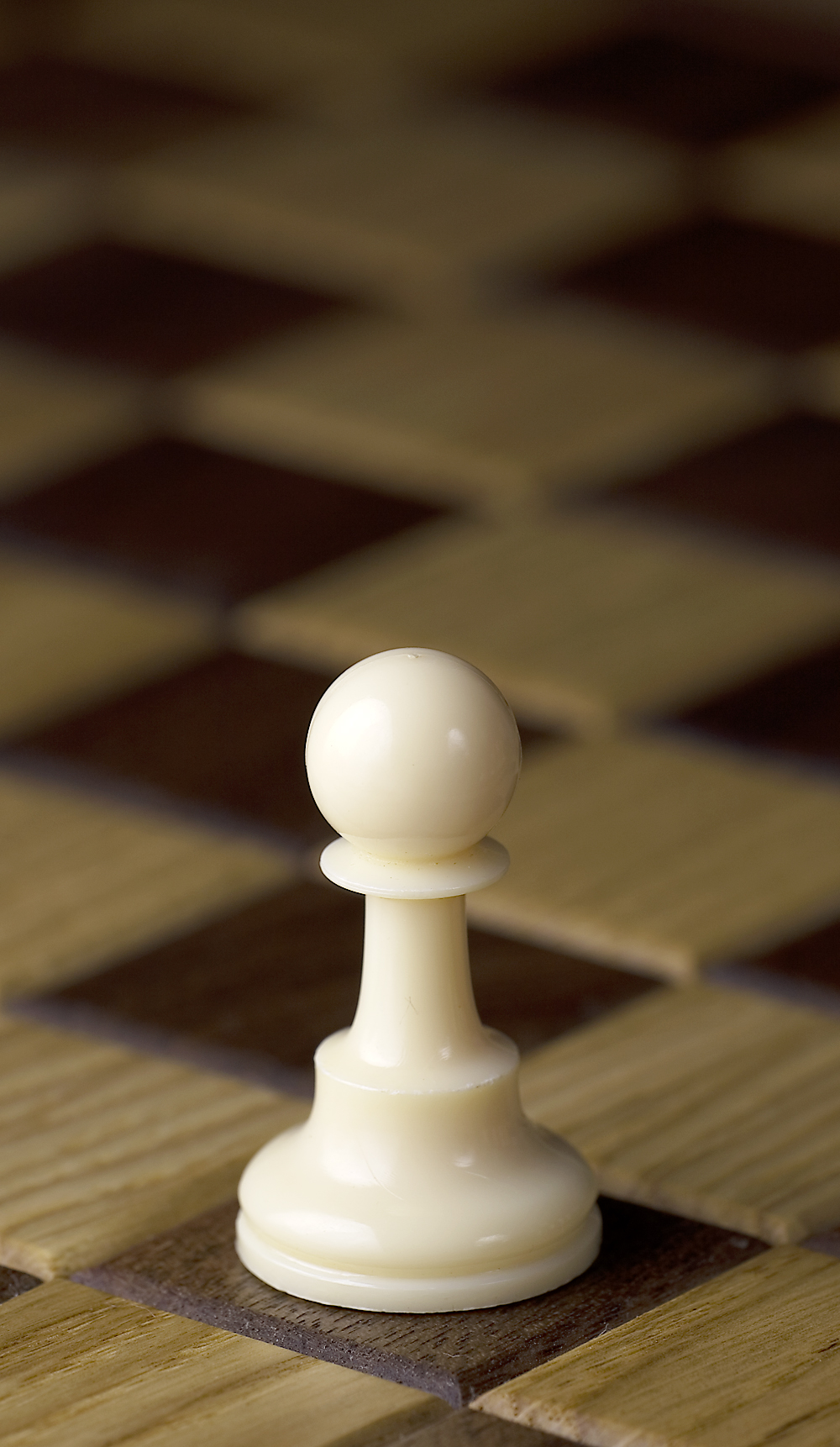
White pawn
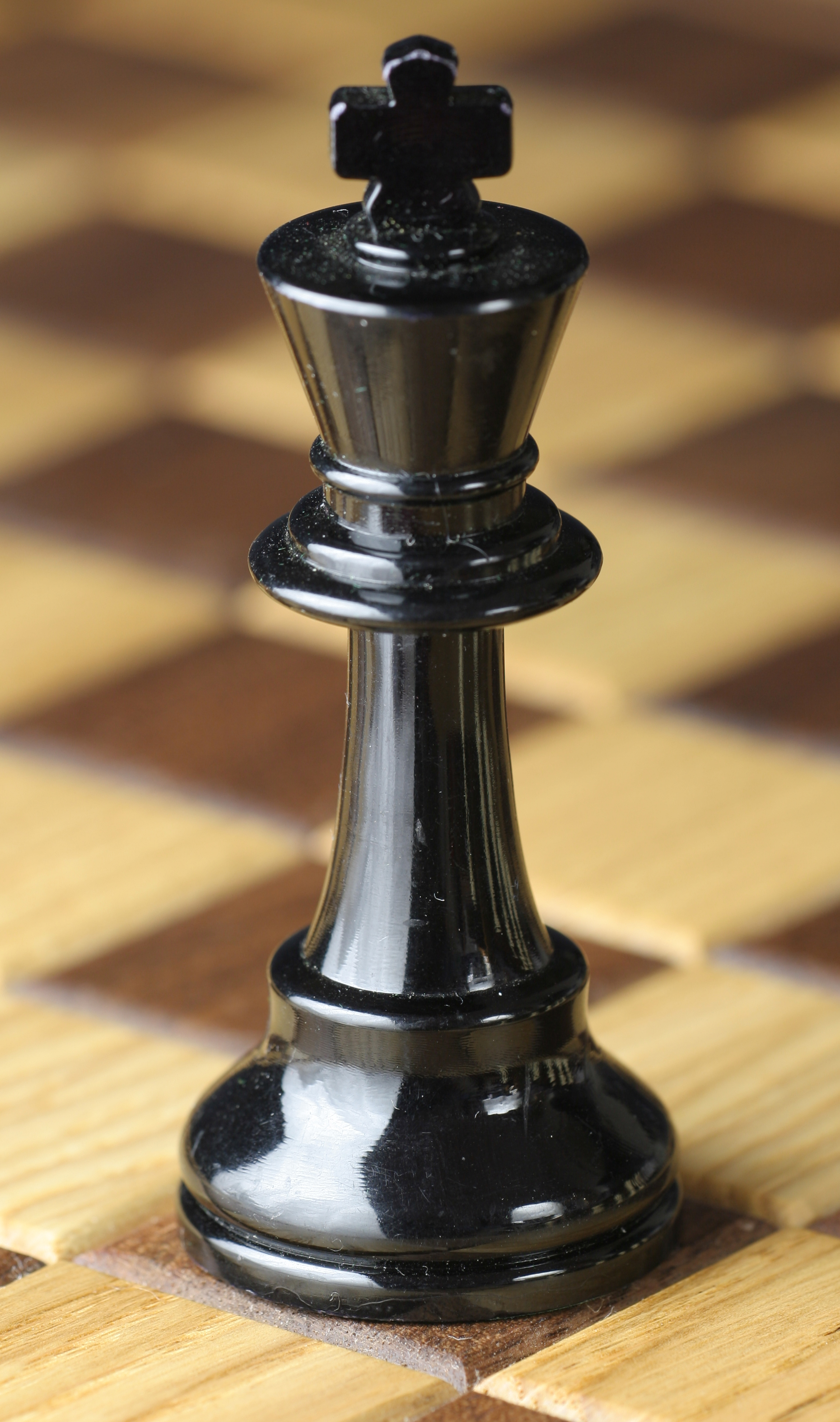
Black king

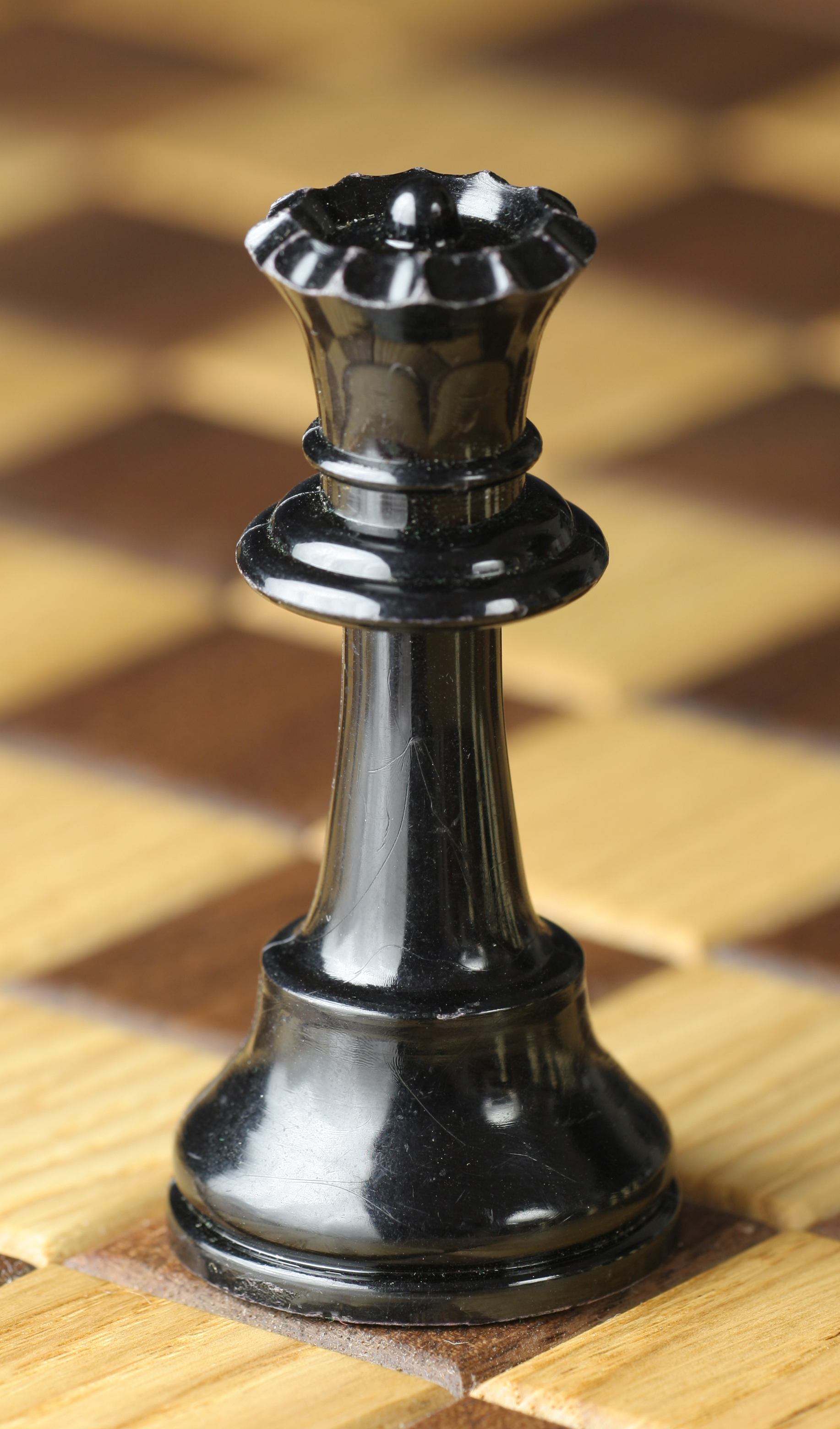
Black queen

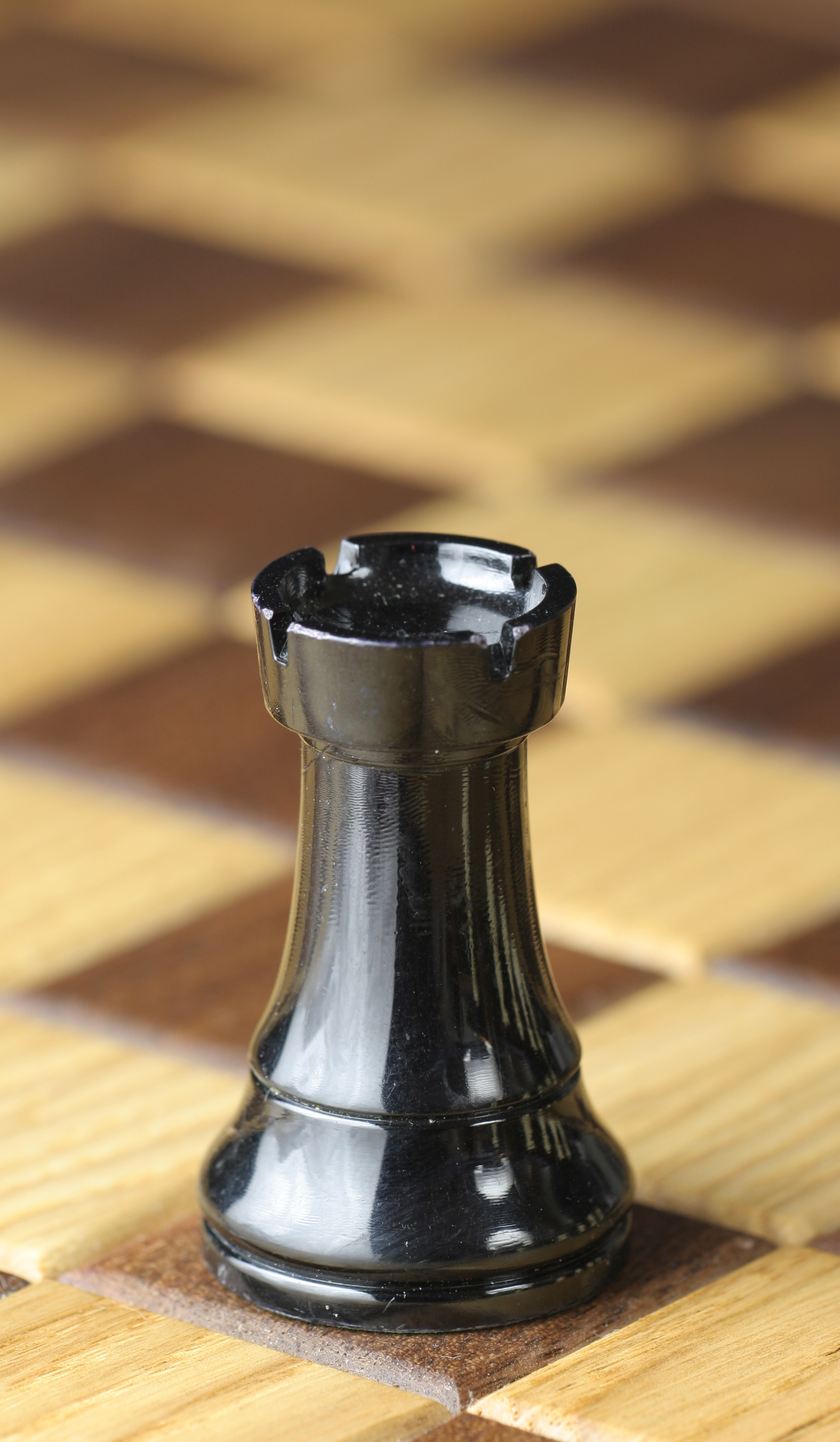
Black rook

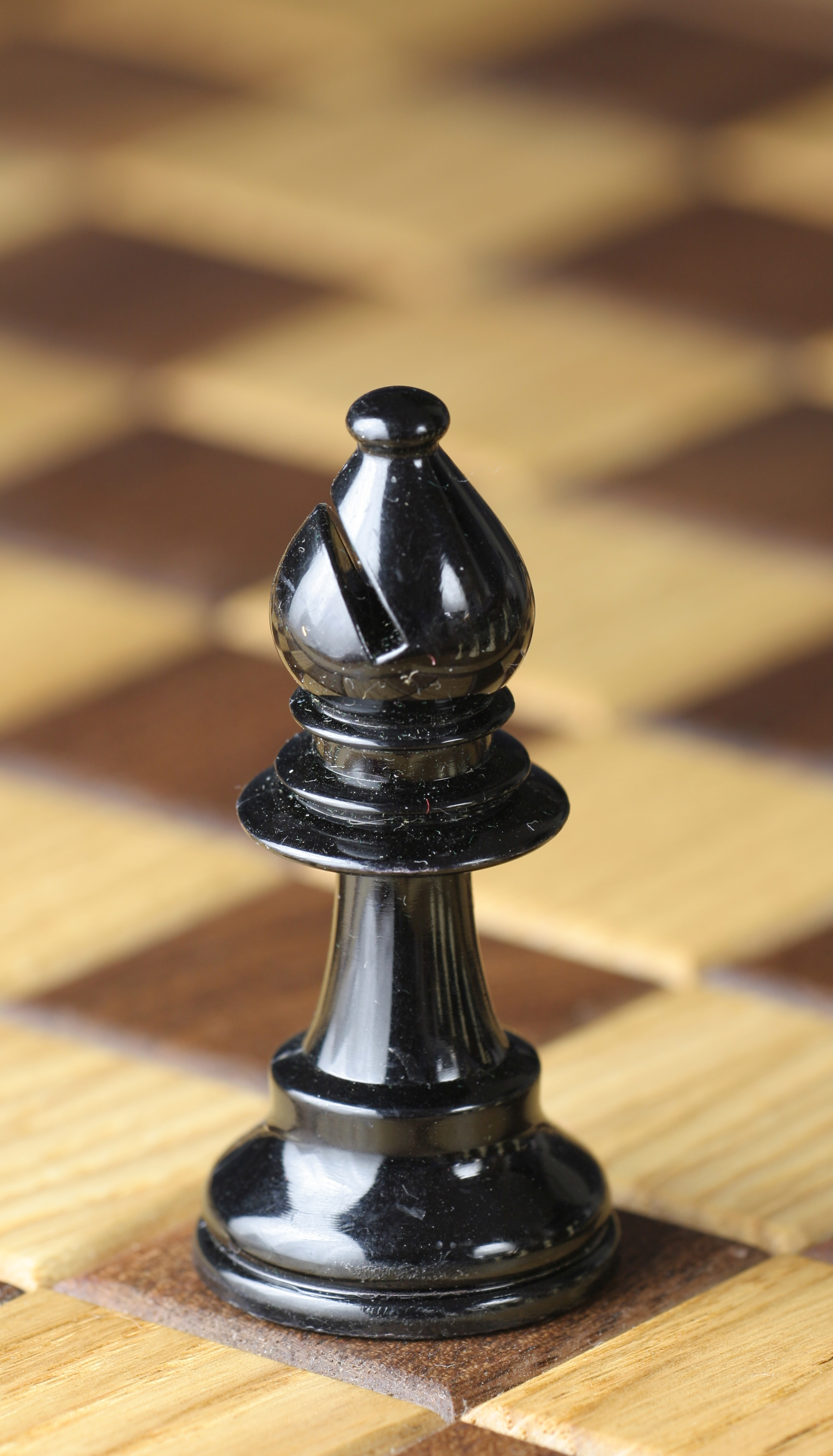
Black bishop

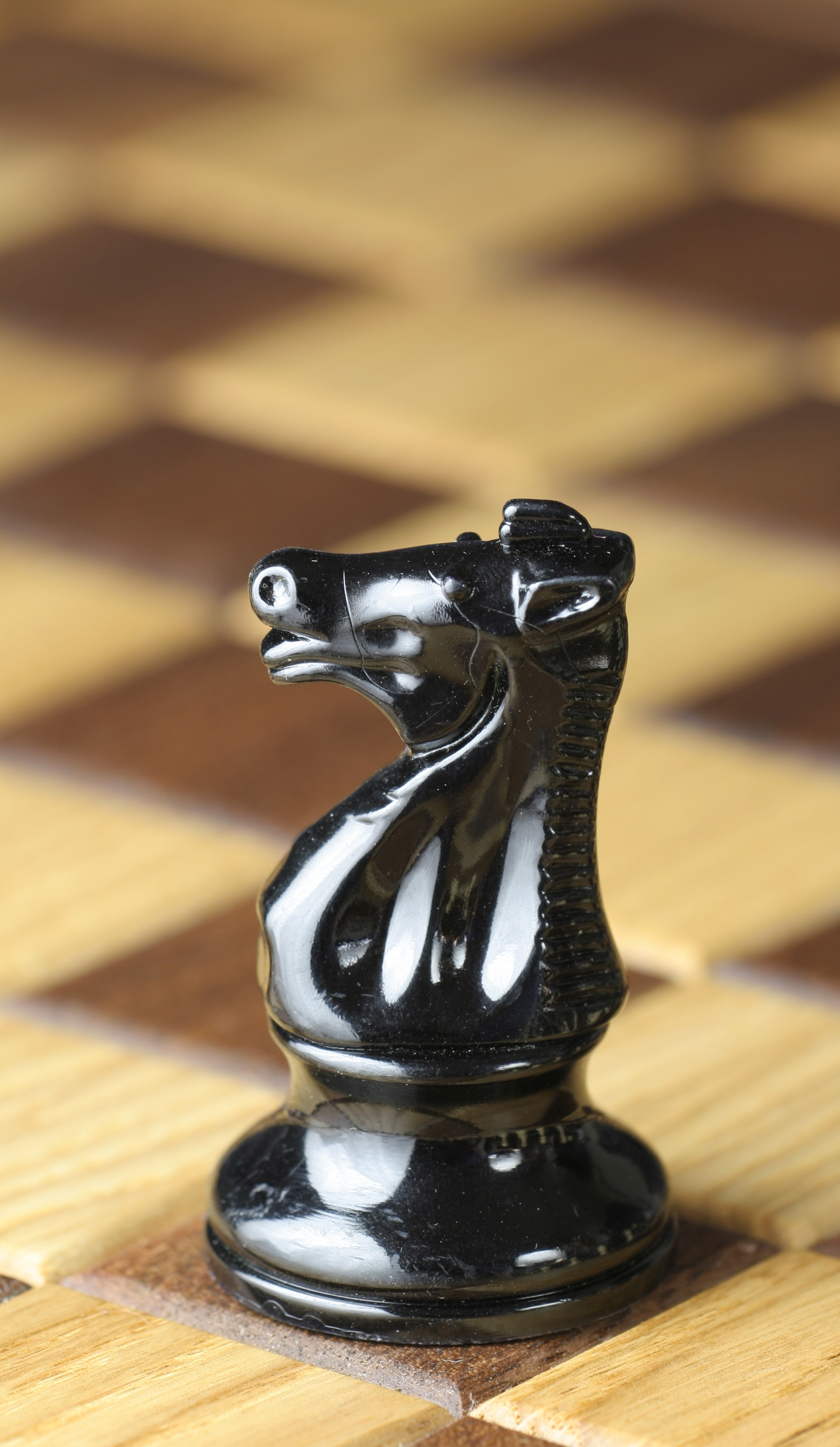
Black knight

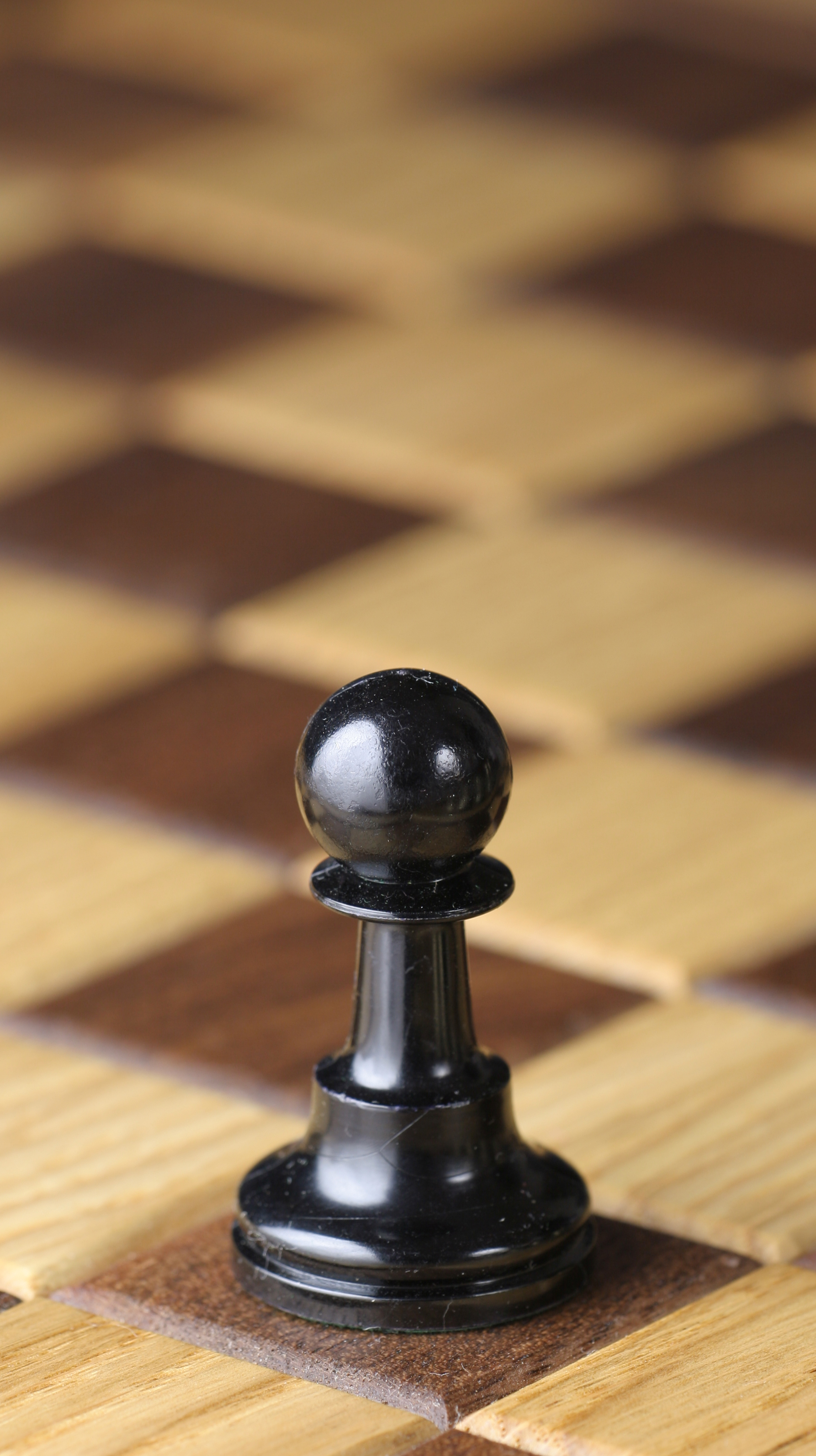
Black pawn

== Knight variations ==
Even among sets of the standard Staunton pattern, the style of the pieces varies, especially the knights. Some examples are shown below.

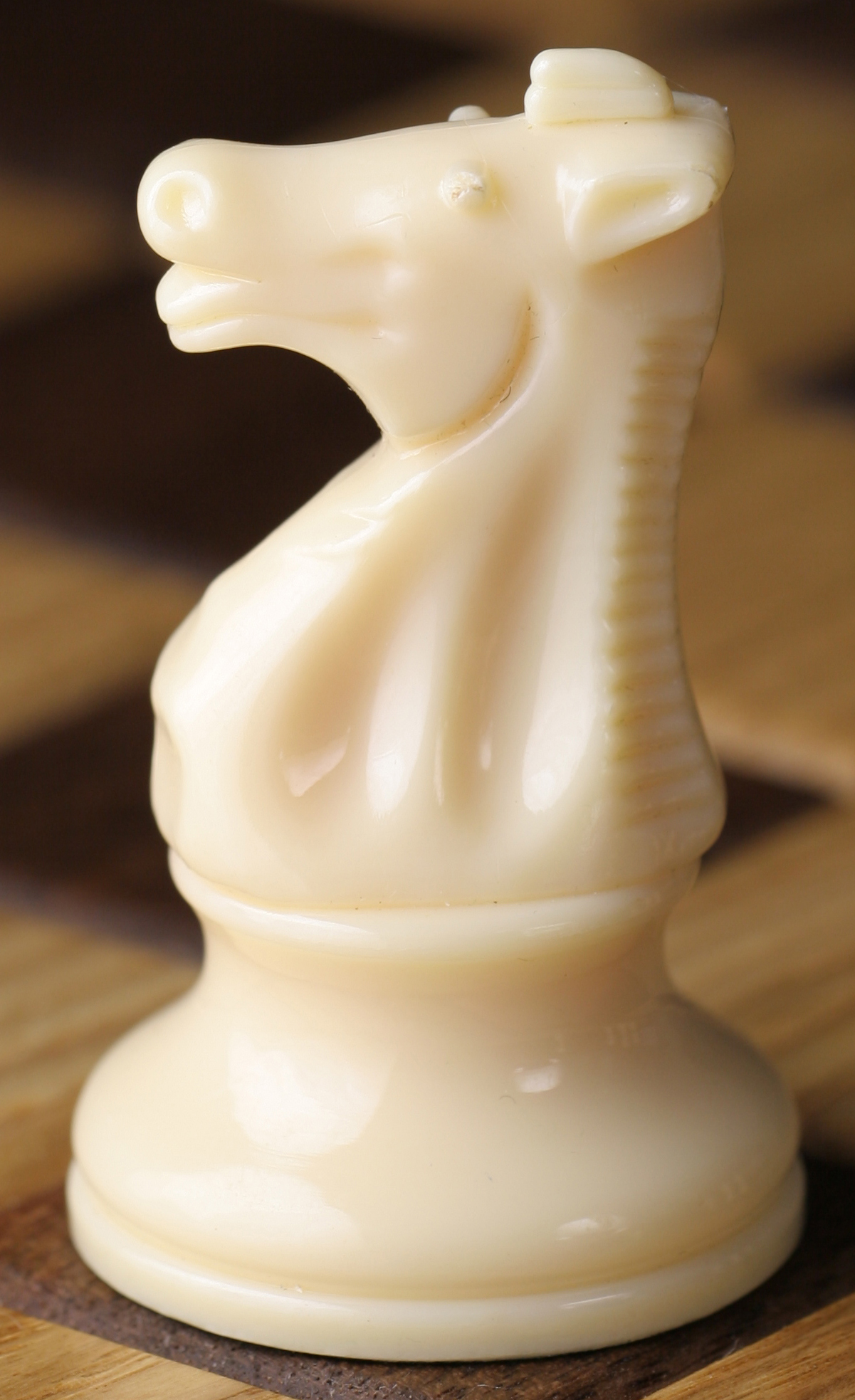

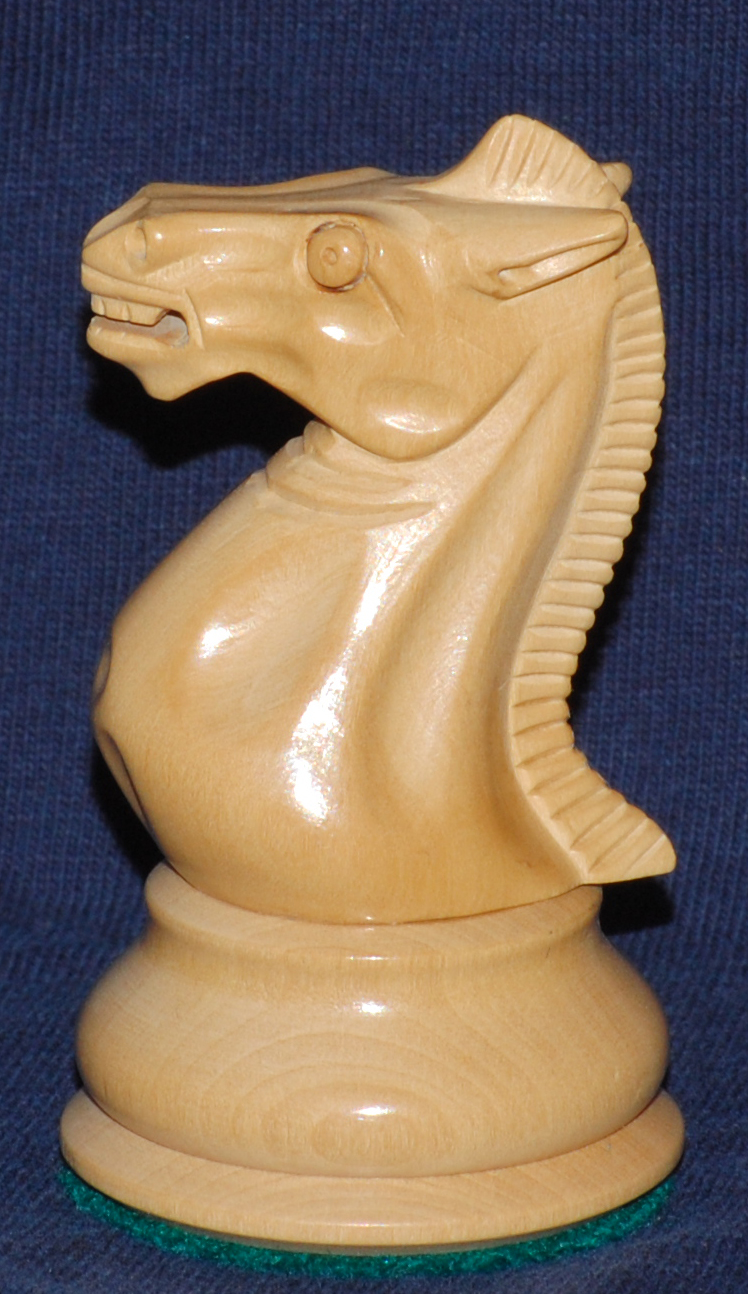

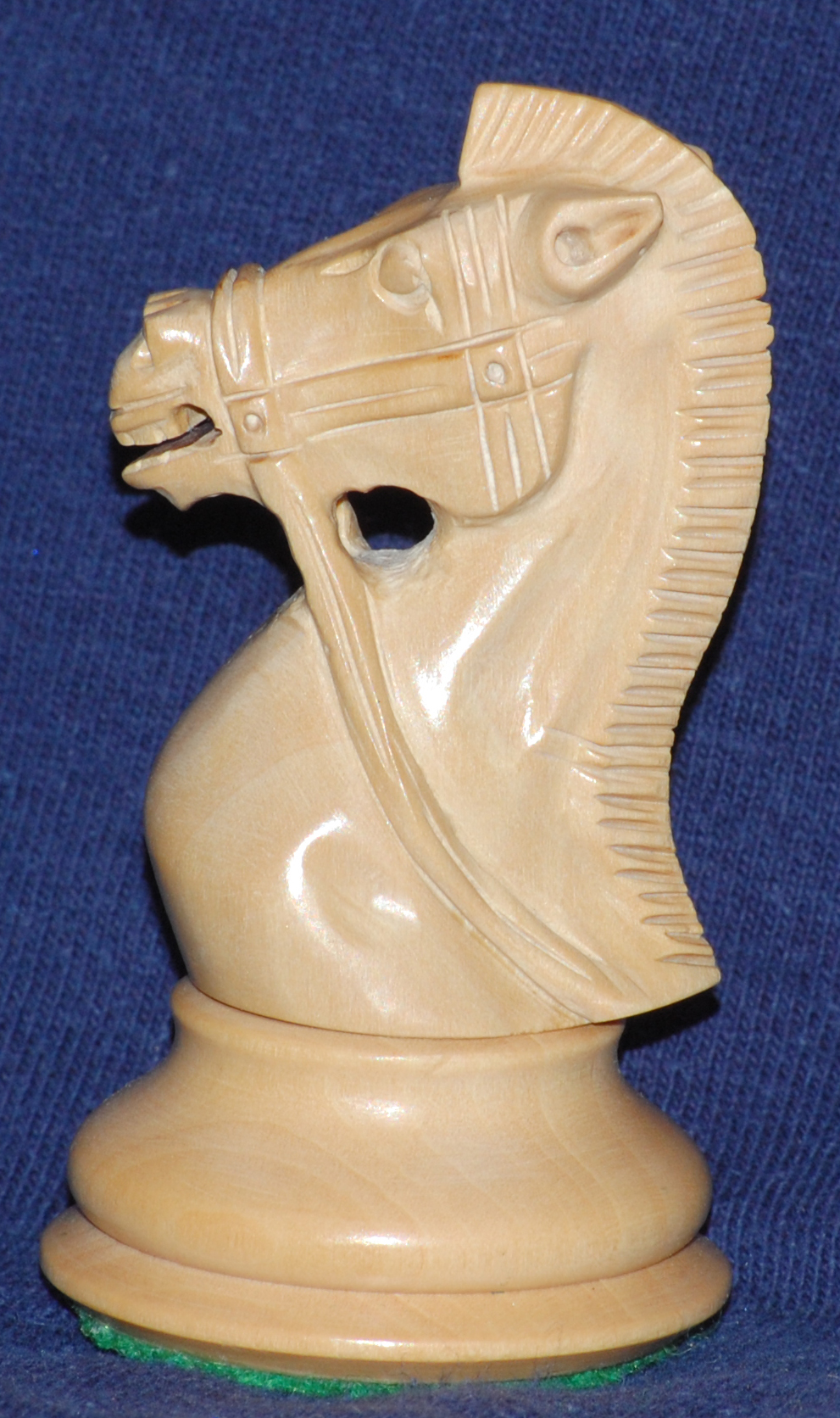

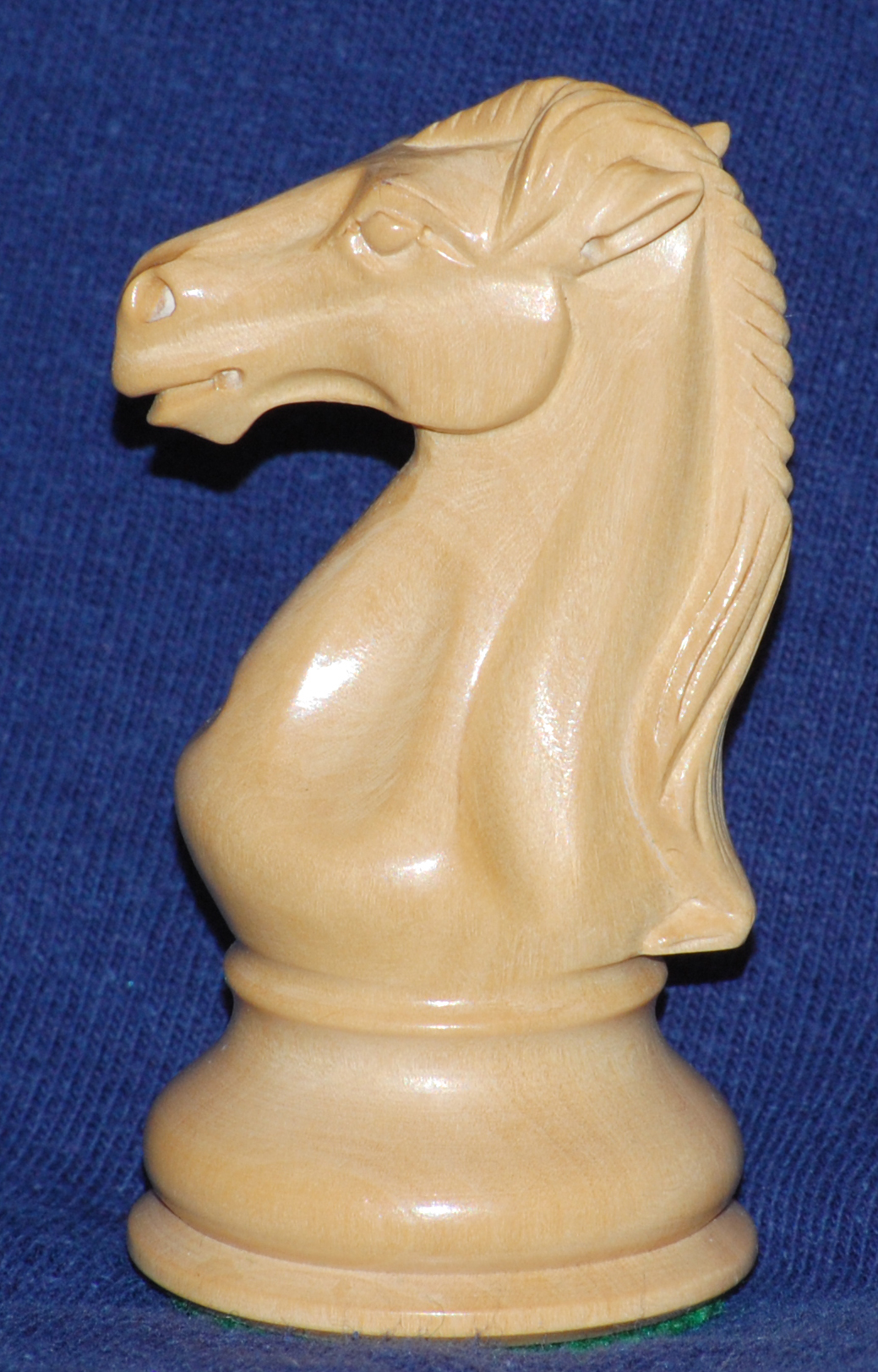

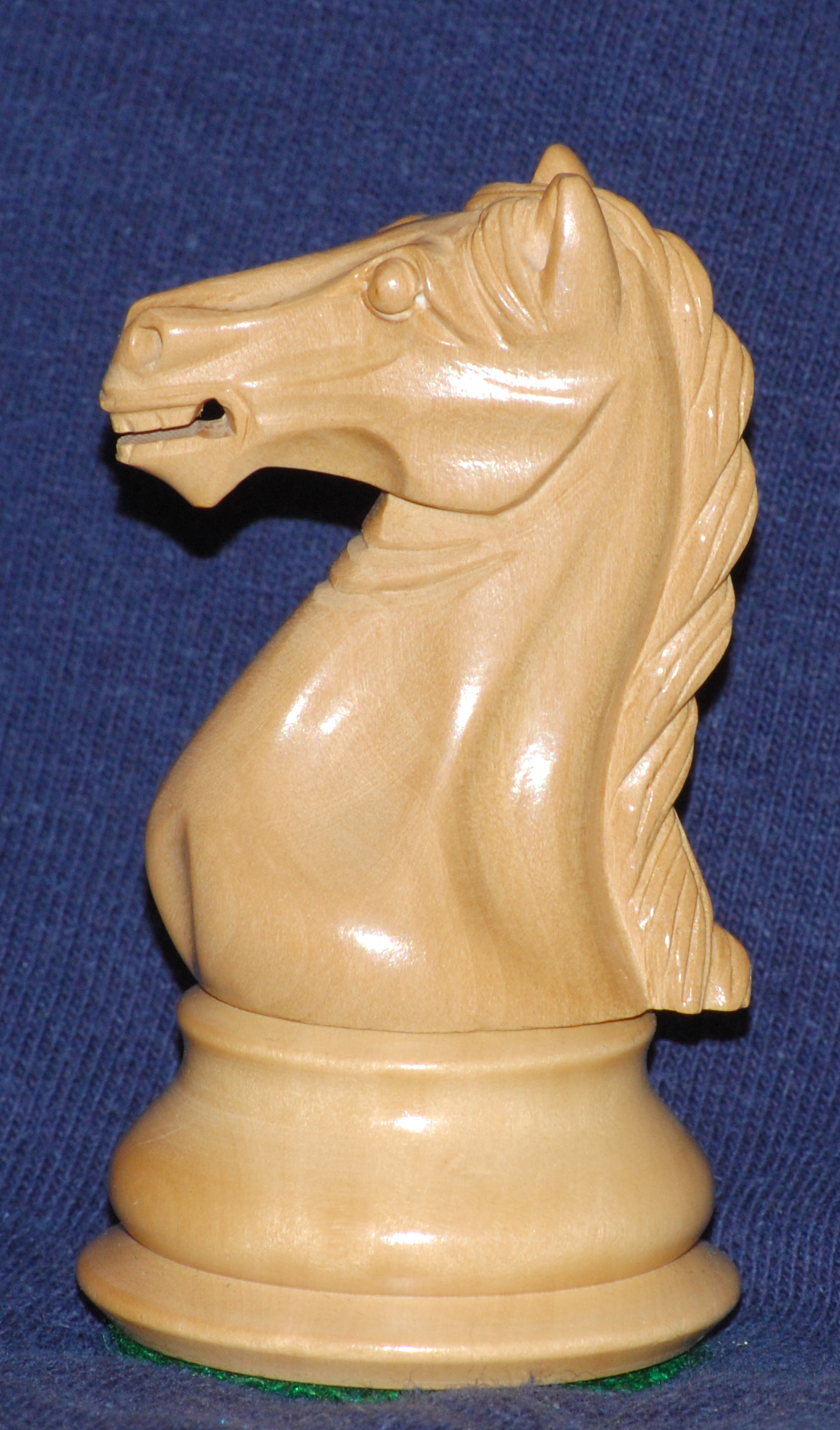

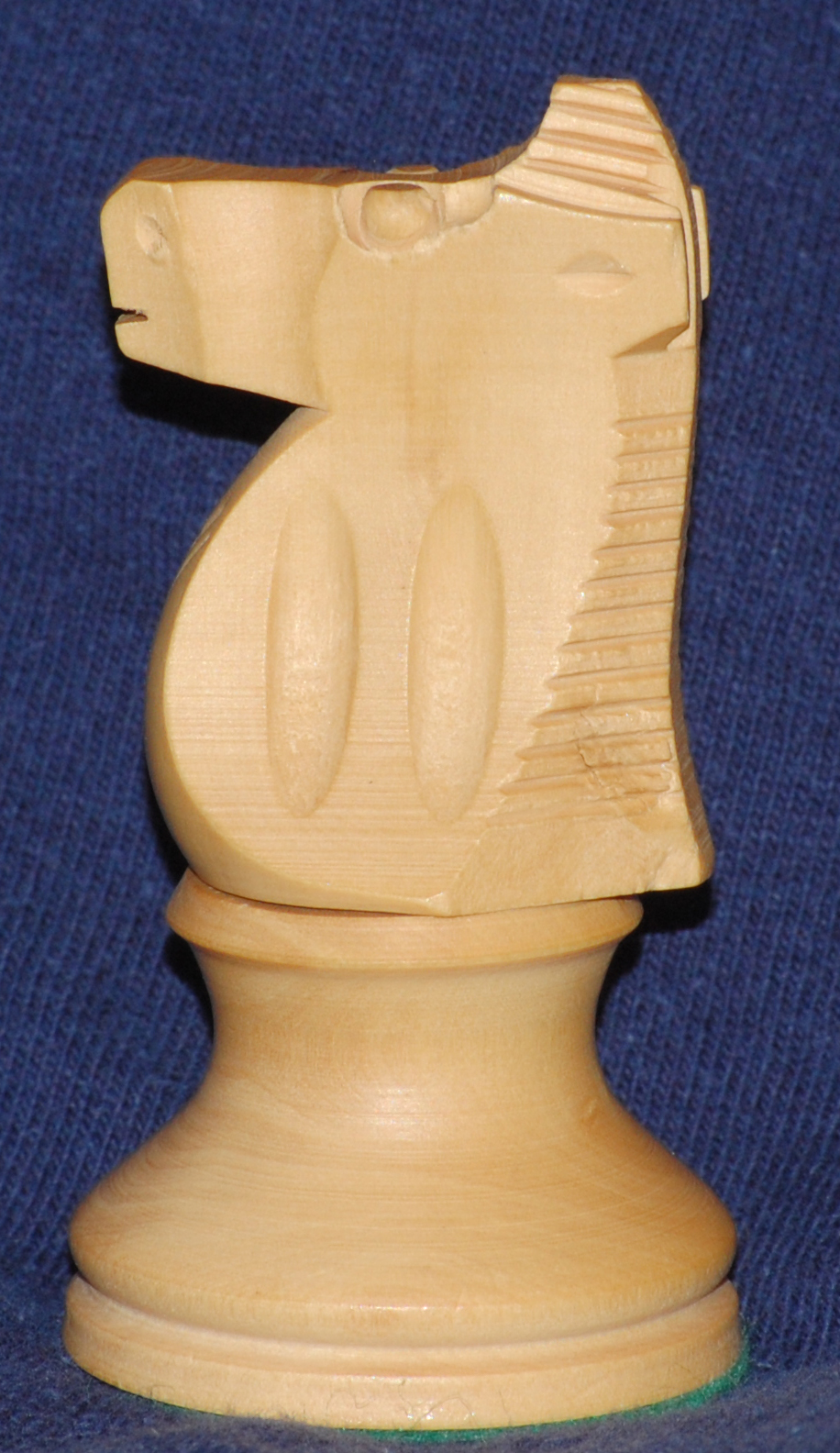

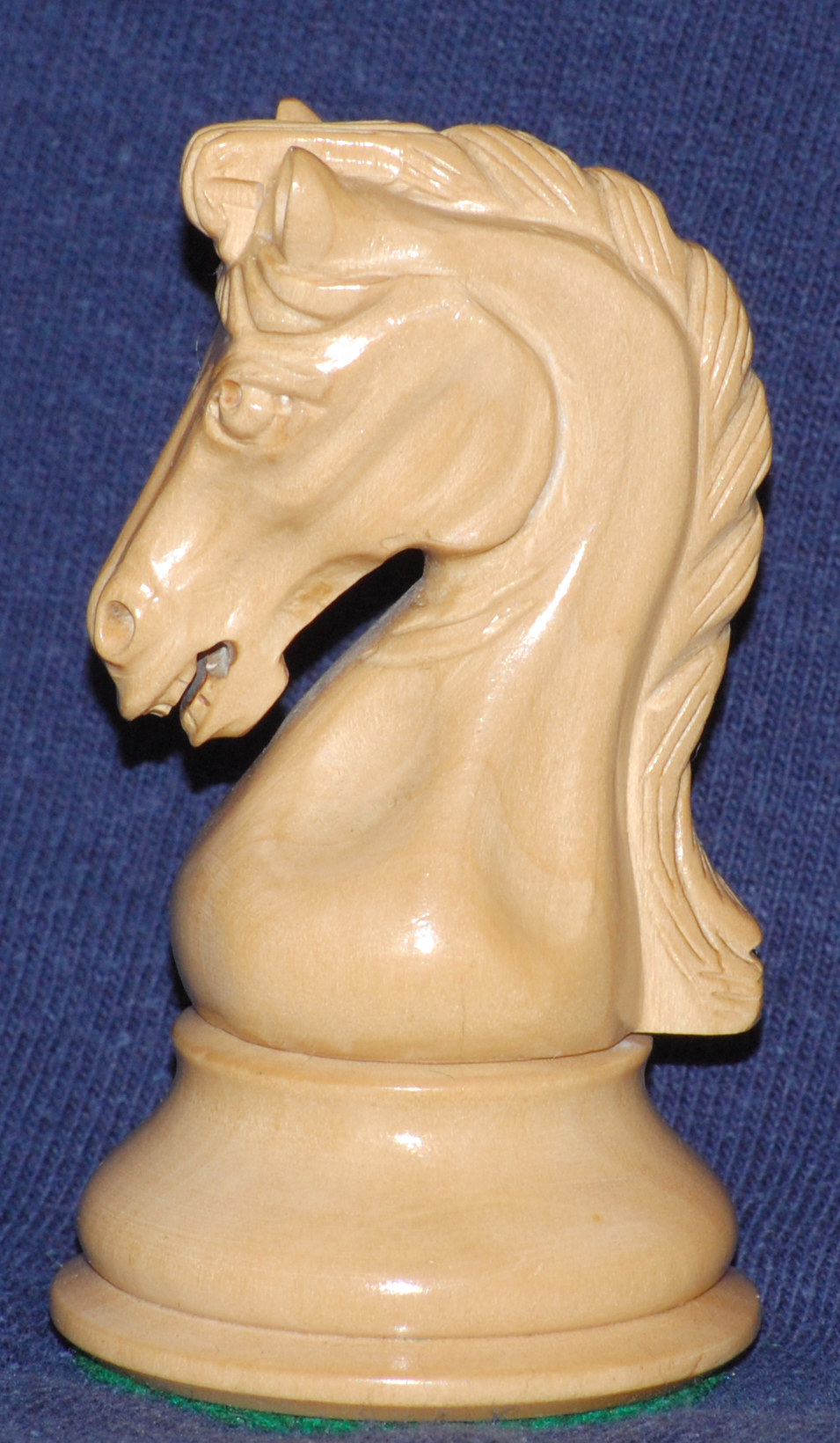

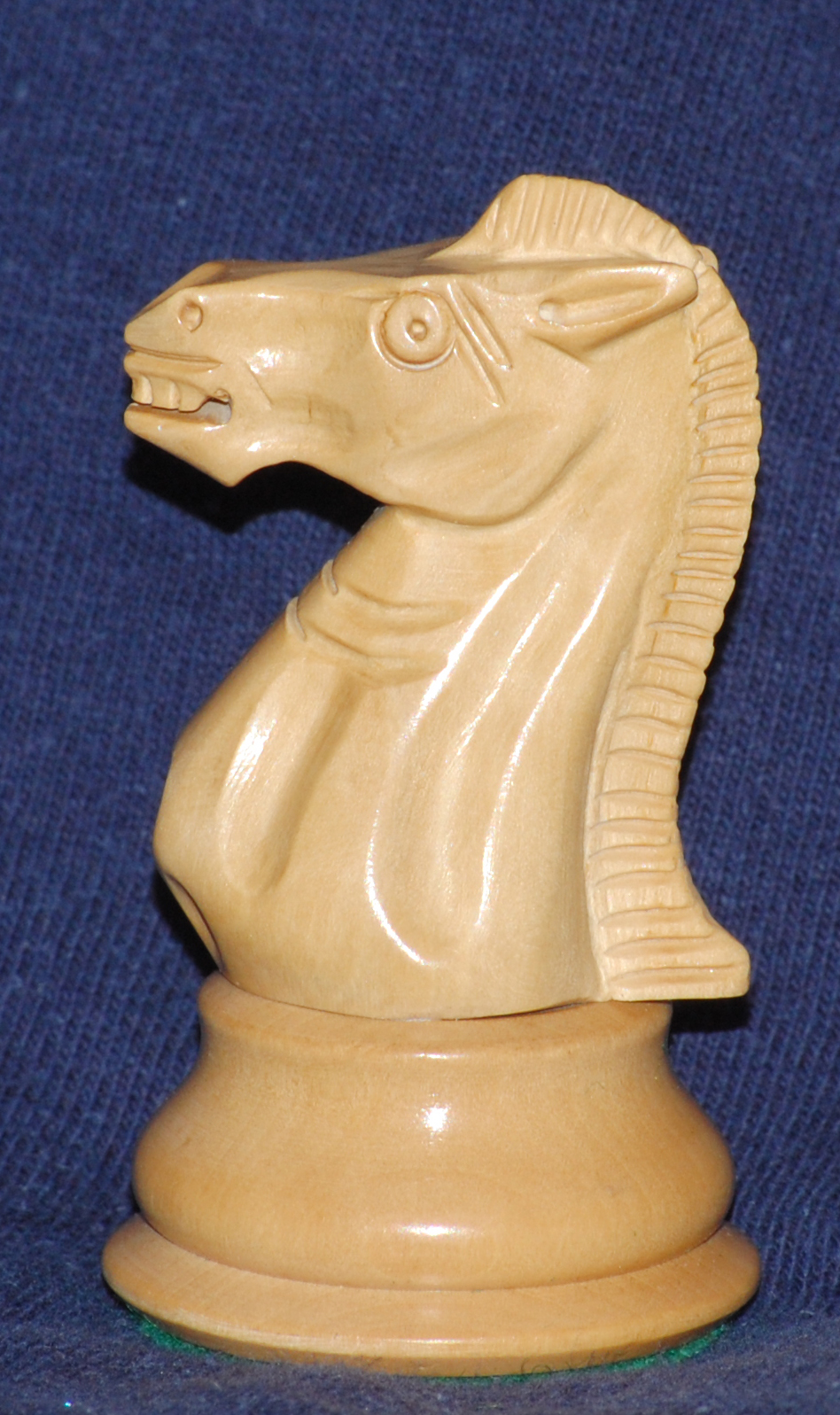

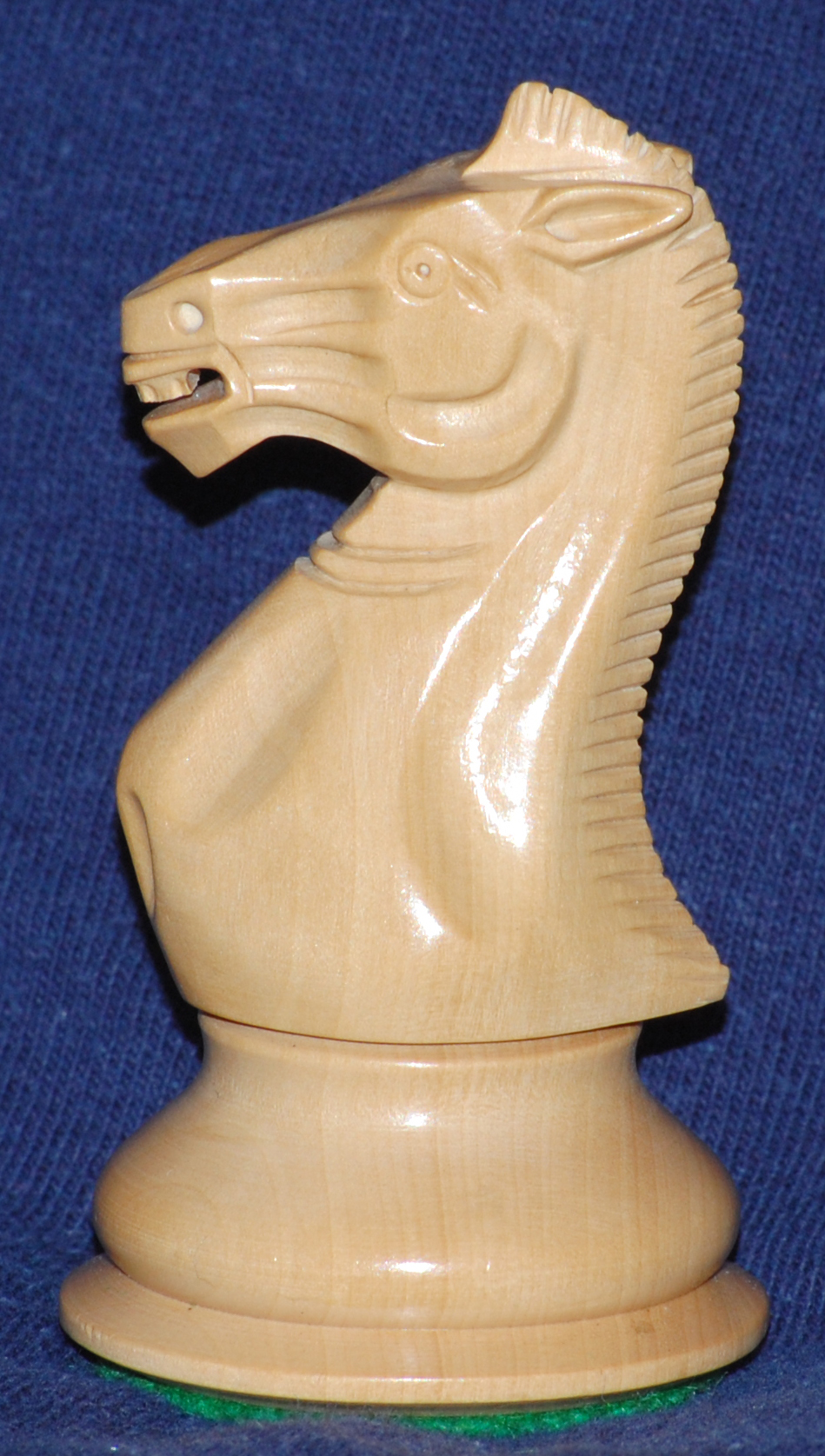

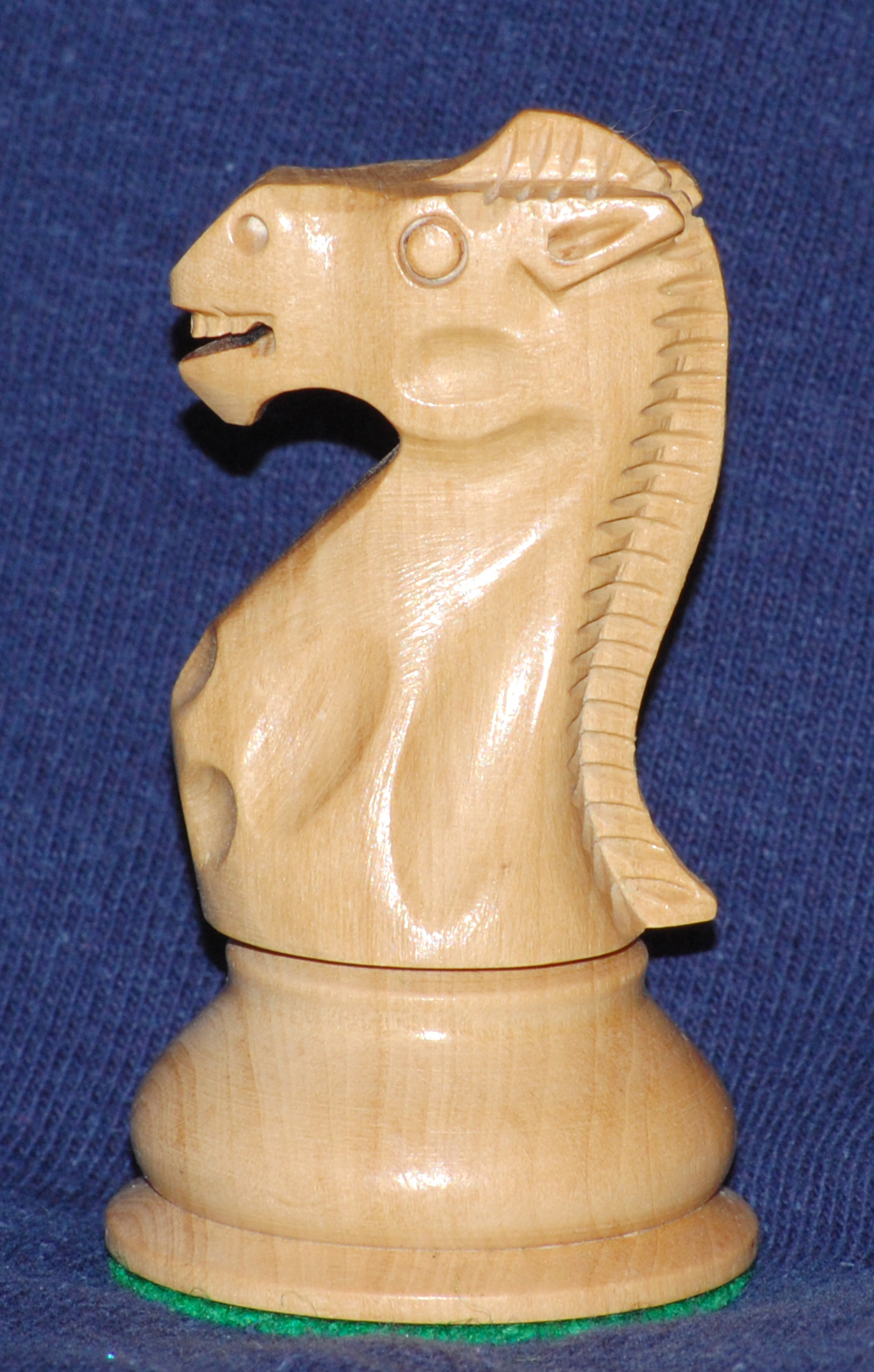

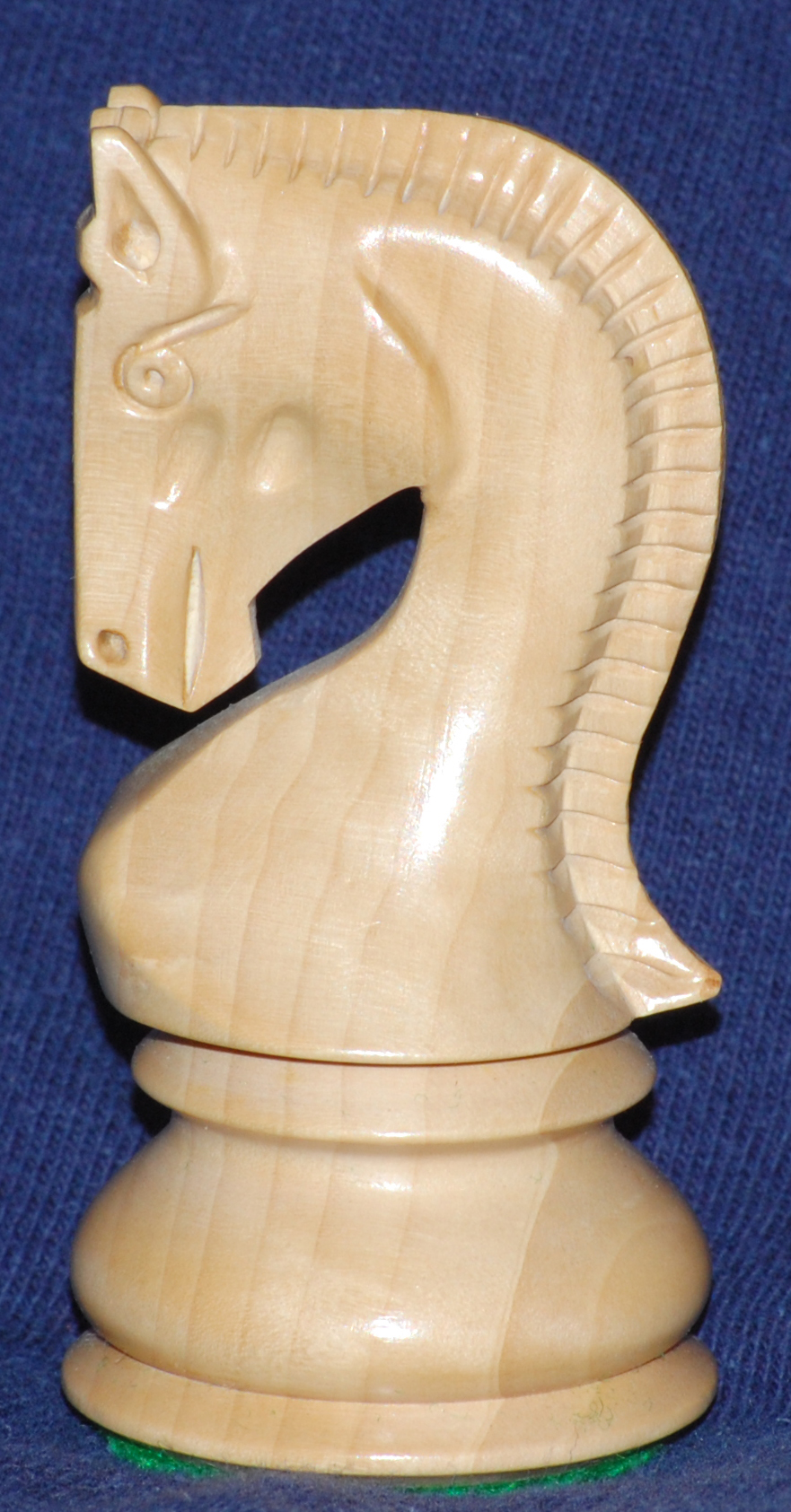

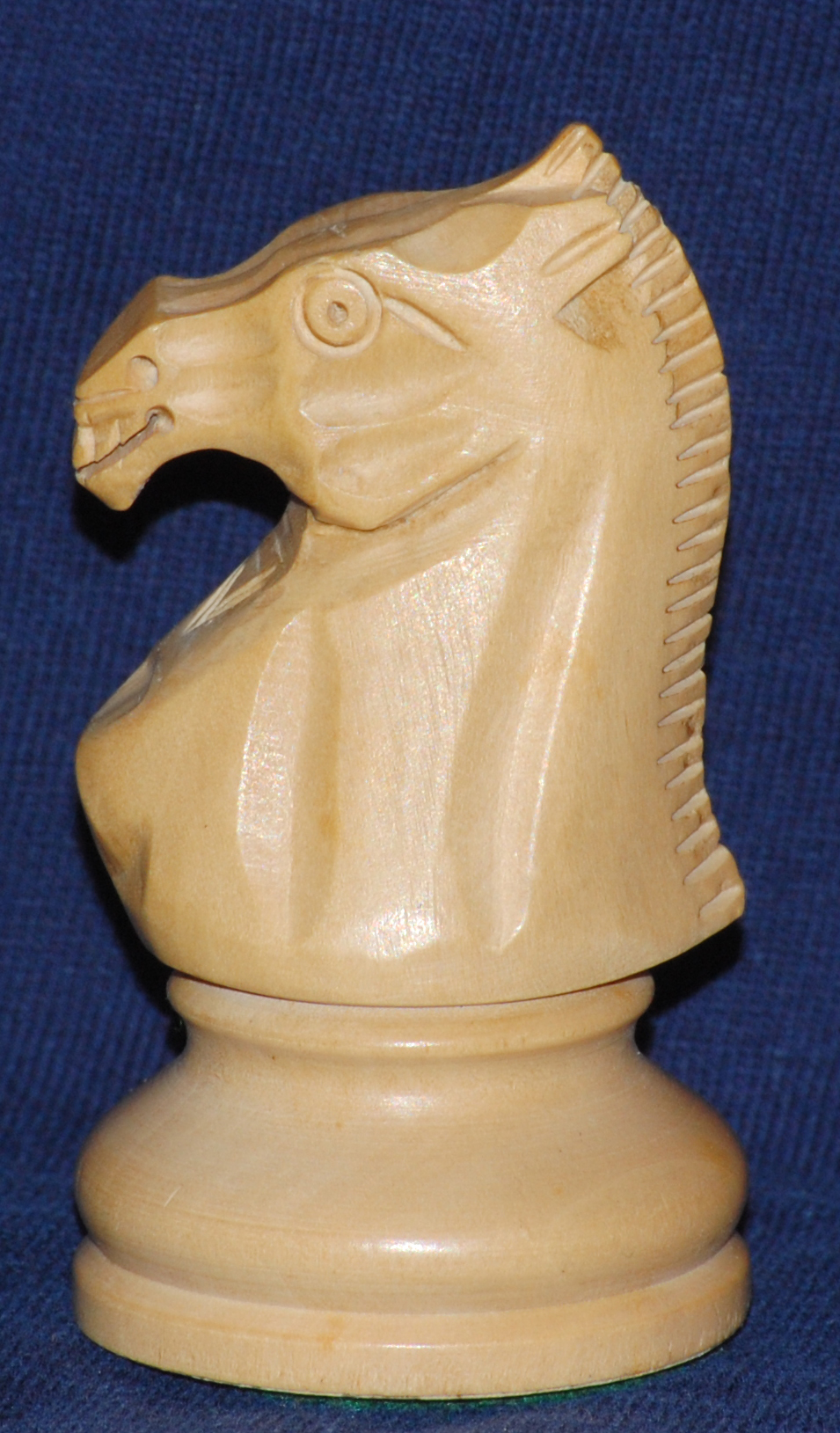

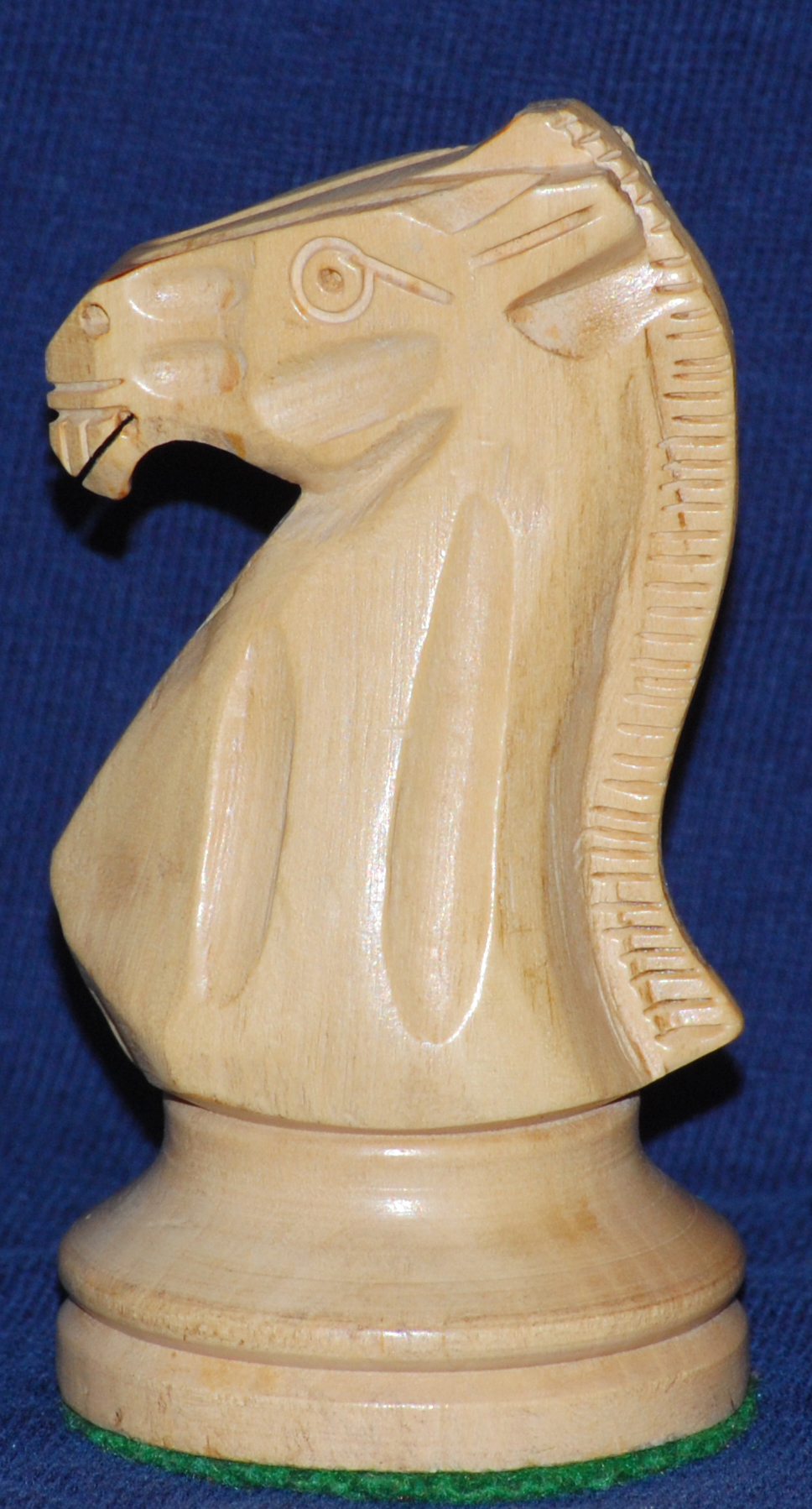

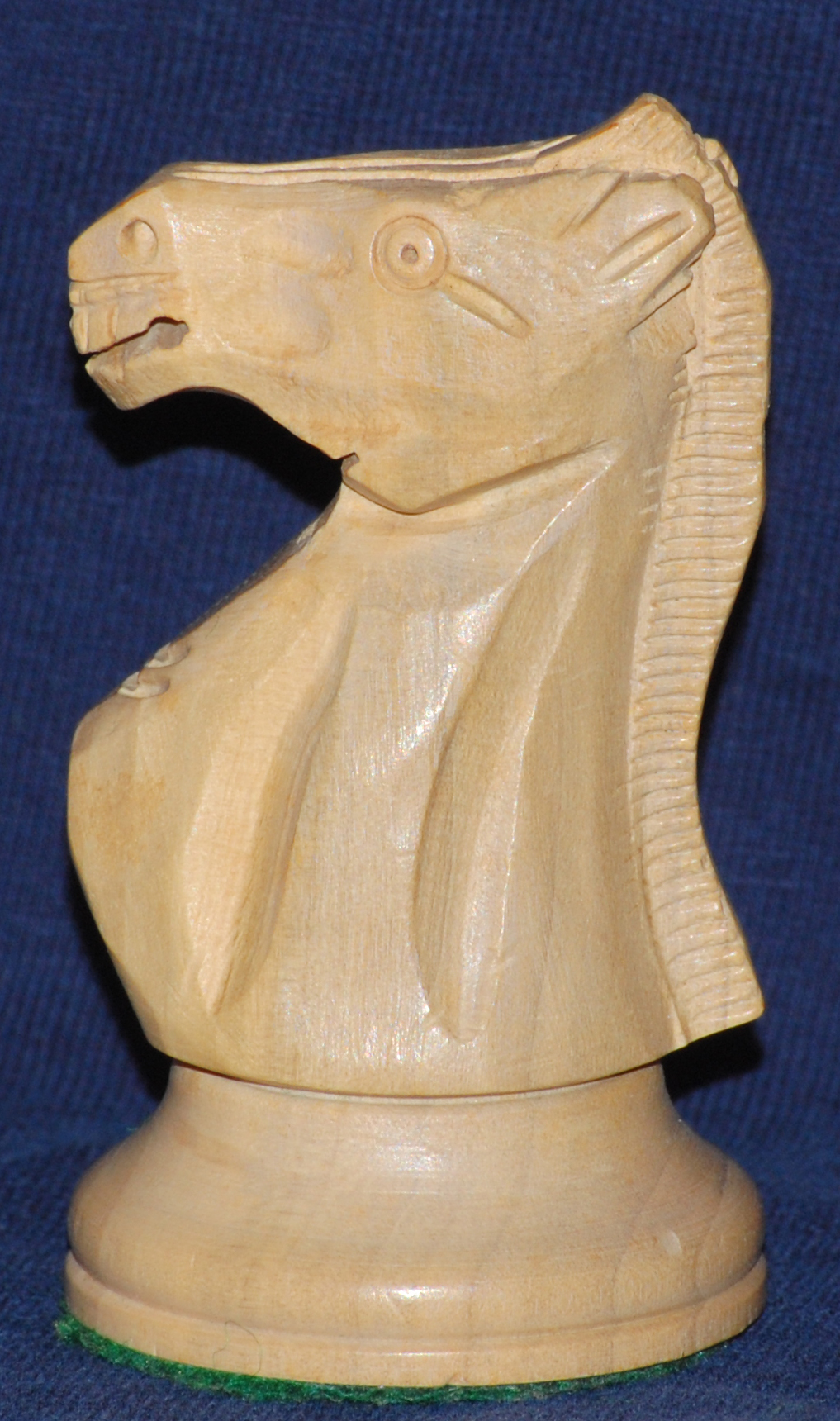

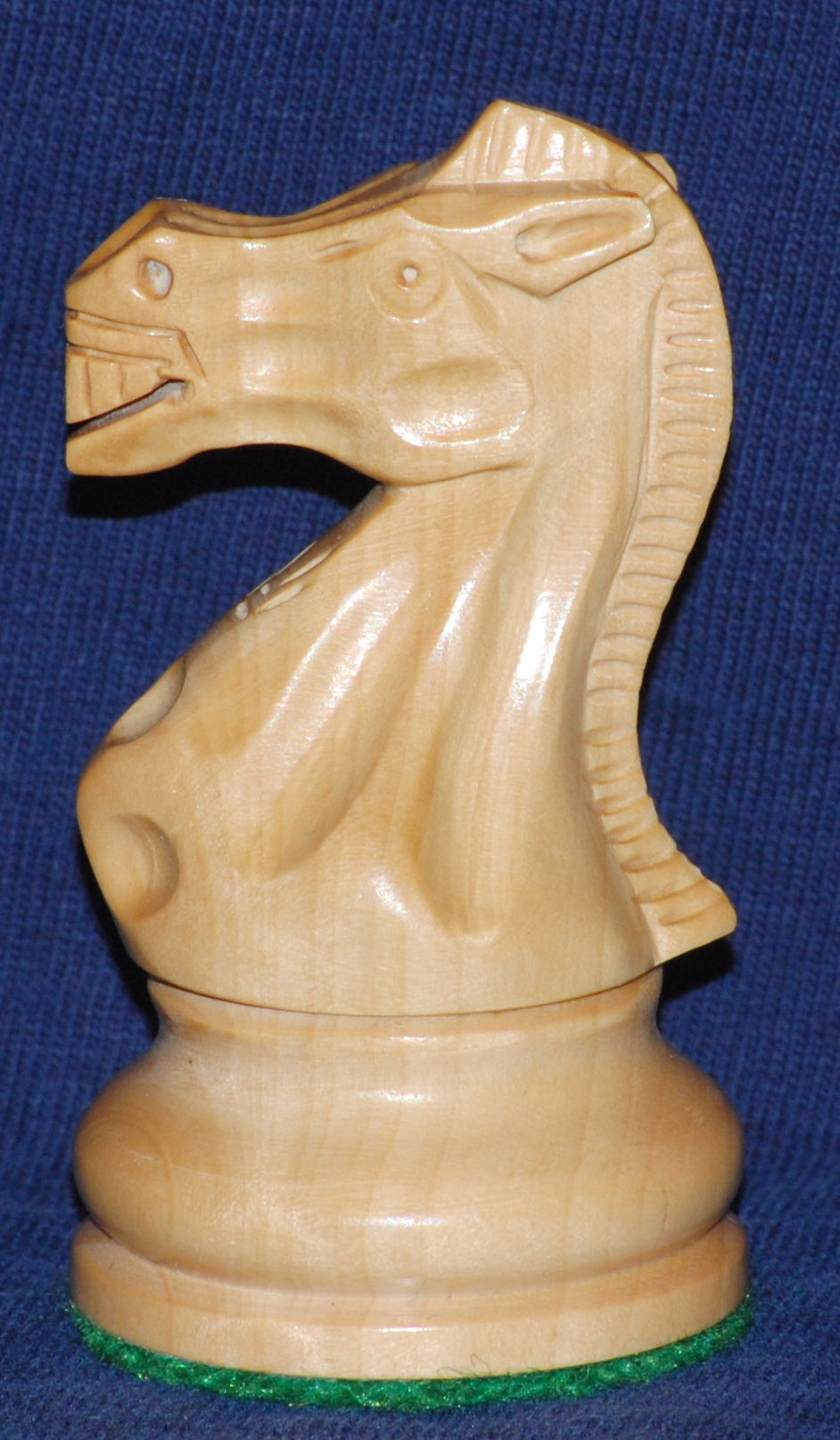

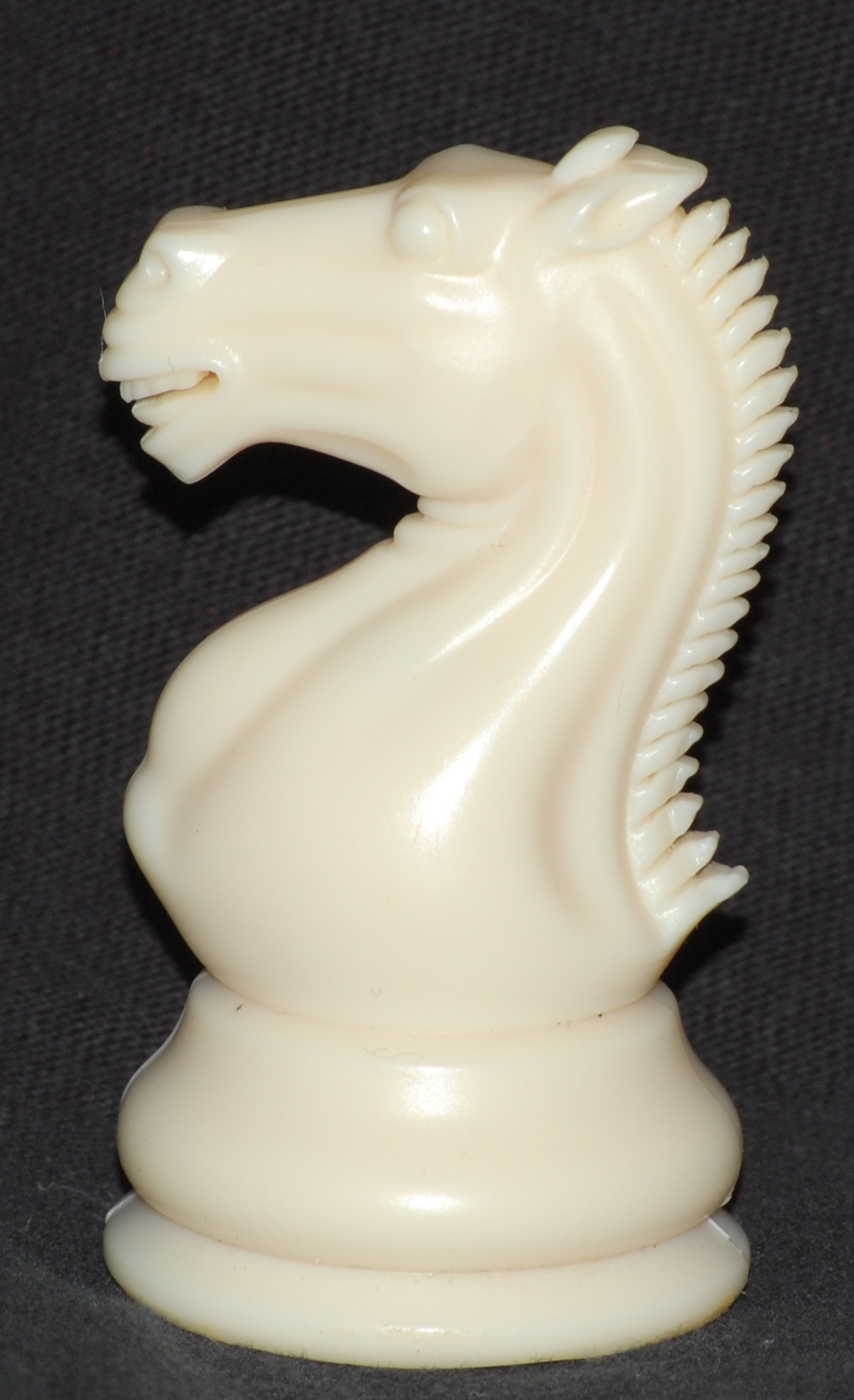

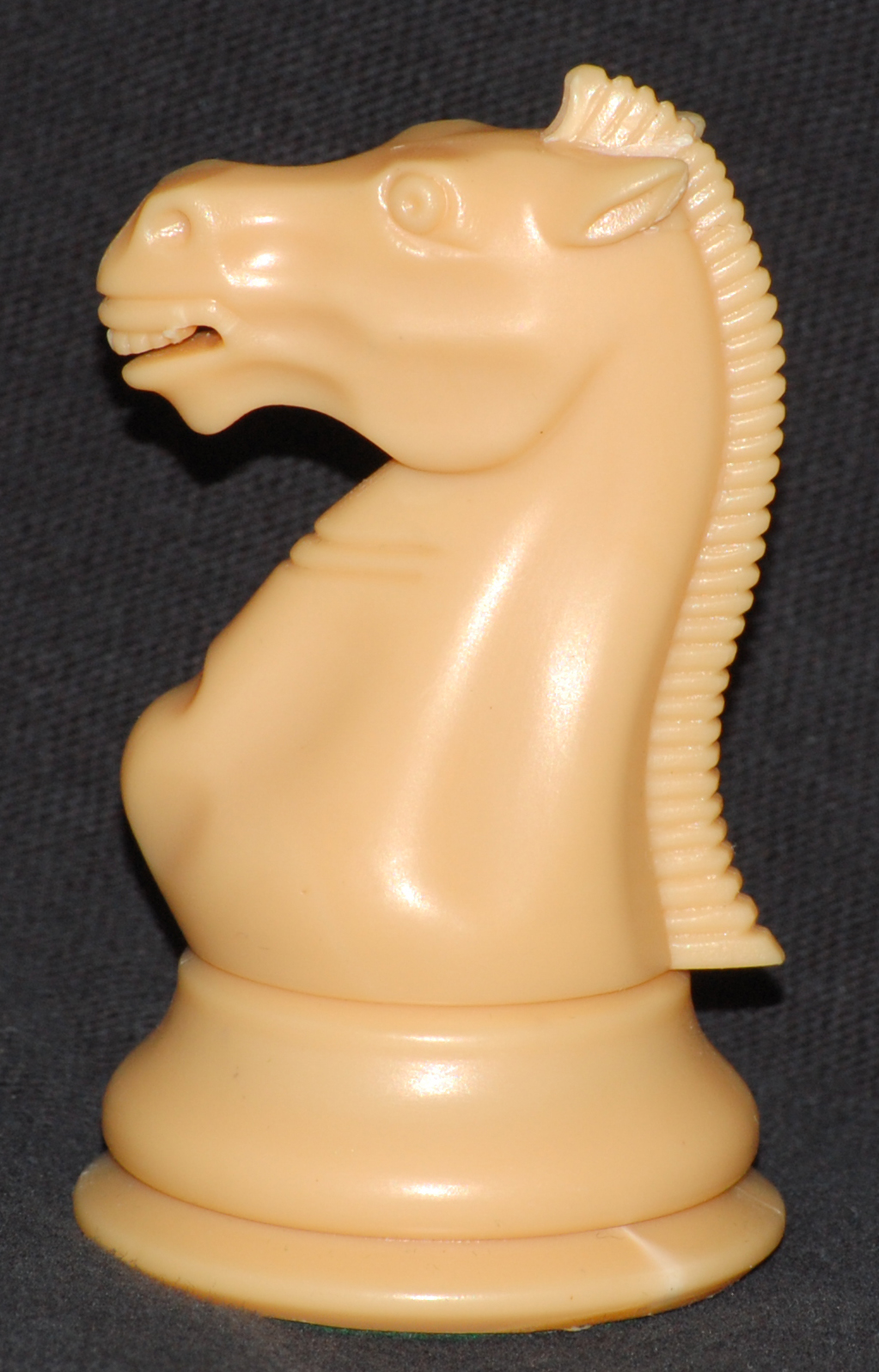

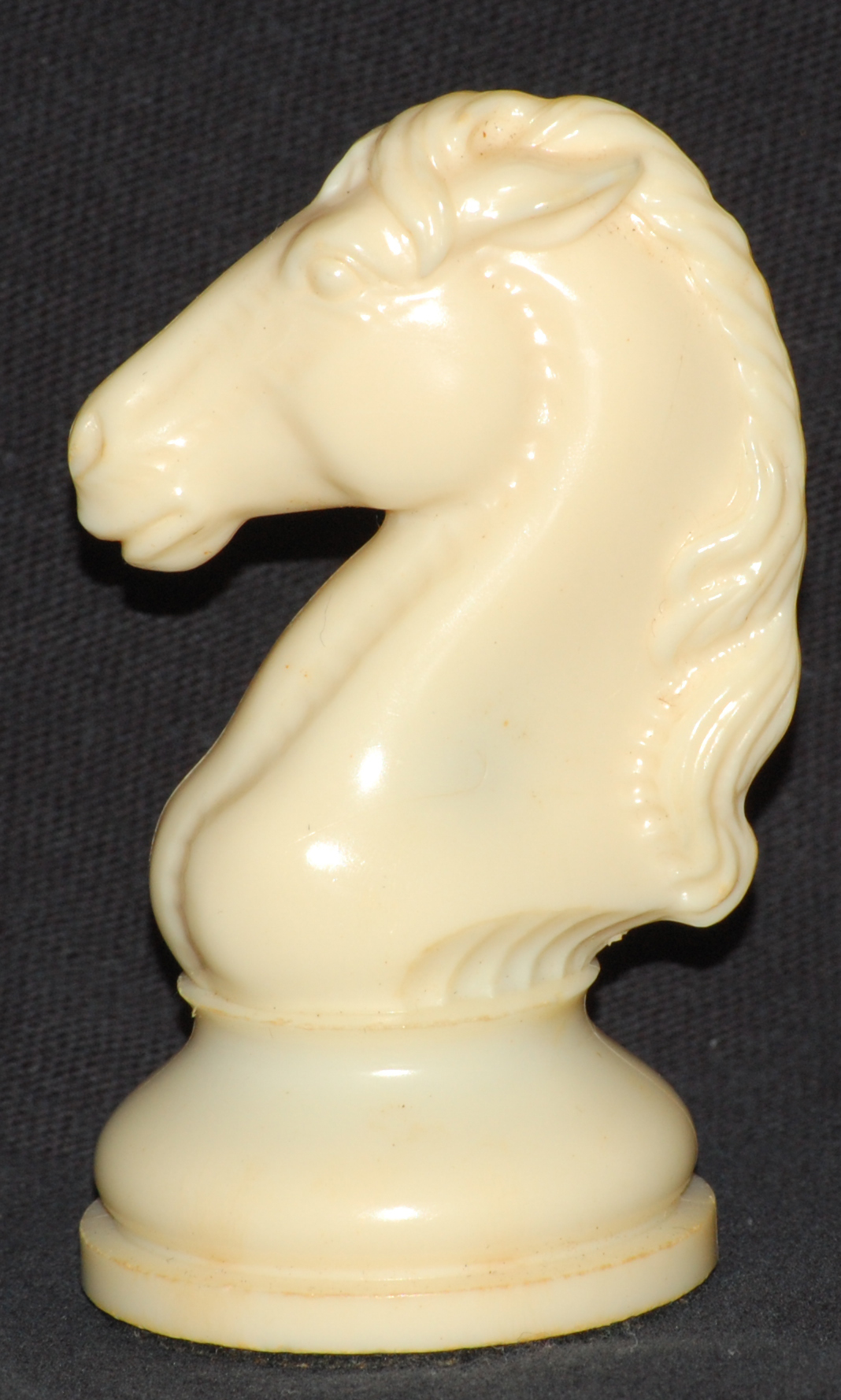

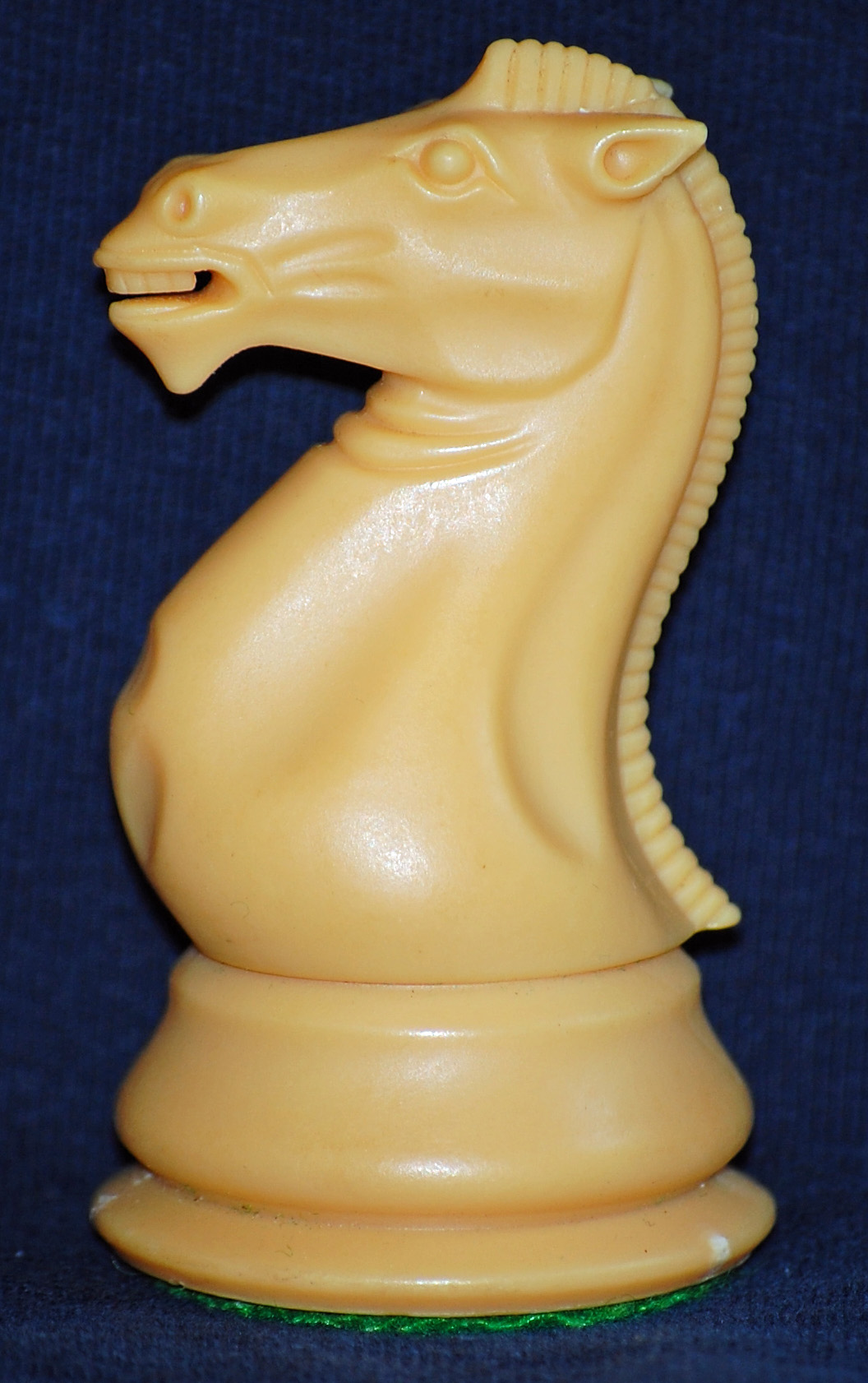

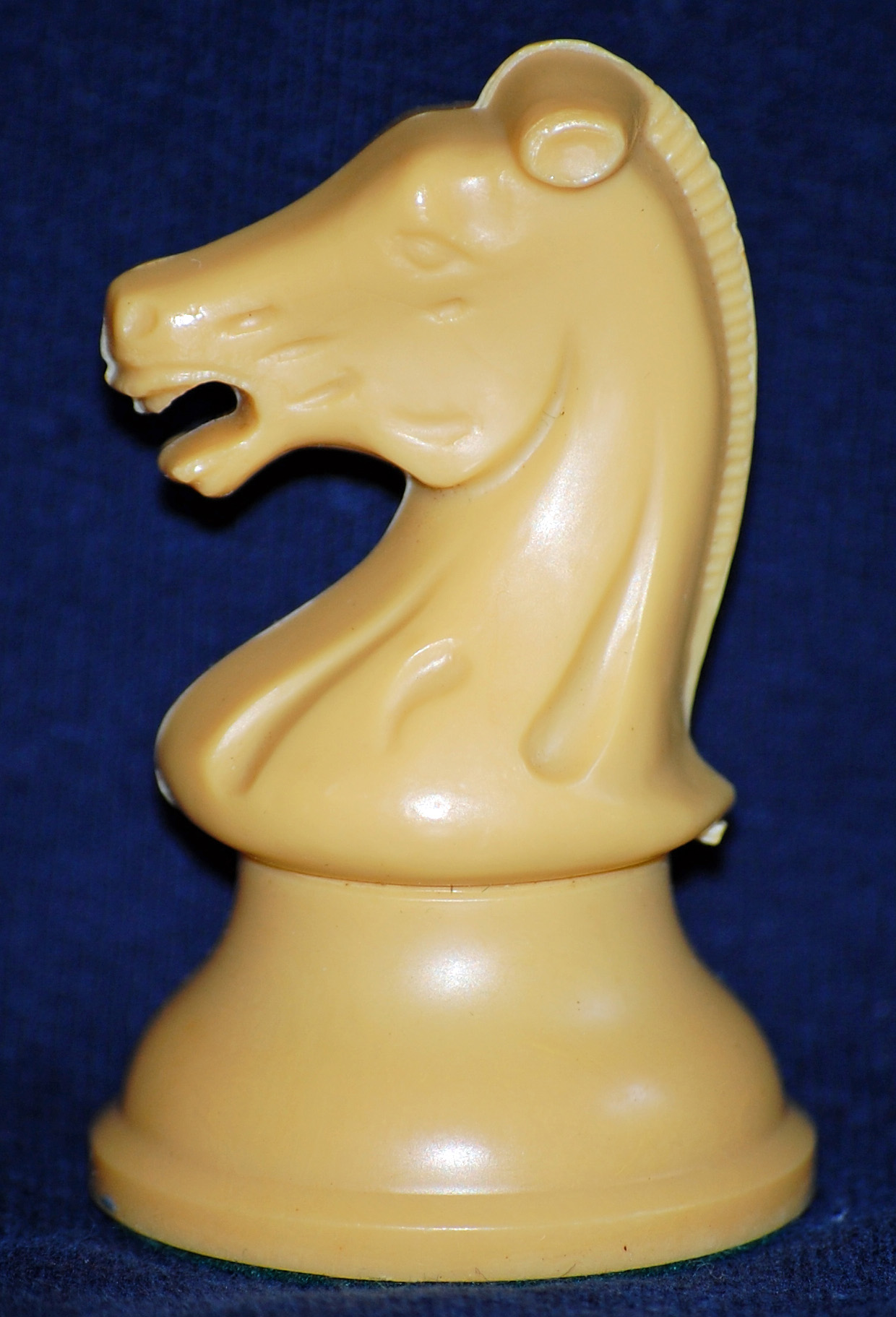

== See also ==
- Dubrovnik chess set
- Lewis chessmen
- Makonde chess set
- Selenus chess set
