= Razdolny =

Radzolny (masculine), Razdolnaya (feminine), or Razdolnoye (neuter) may refer to:

- Razdolny, Russia (Razdolnaya, Razdolnoye), name of several rural localities in Russia
- Rozdolne, a town in Crimea, Ukraine
- Razdolnaya, a river in the People's Republic of China and Russia
- Razdolnoye, Kazakhstan, a village in the Almaty Province, Kazakhstan
