= List of Destination Truth episodes =

This is a list of episodes of the paranormal reality series Destination Truth.

== Series overview ==
Season	Episodes	Originally released	
Season	Episodes	First released	Last released
1	6	June 6, 2007	July 18, 2007
2	13	March 5, 2008	October 15, 2008
3	15	September 9, 2009	April 21, 2010
4	14	September 9, 2010	April 19, 2011
5	7	July 10, 2012	August 14, 2012

== Episodes ==
=== Season 1 (2007) ===
No. overall	No. in season	Title	Original release date
1	1	"Iguanodon & Ri"	June 6, 2007
In Papua New Guinea, Josh searches for an Iguanadon in the jungles near the village of Tinganavudu. Next Josh hunts a mermaid-like creature called the Ri in the waters off New Ireland. The premiere of this episode was watched by 1.40 million households.
2	2	"Haunted Village & Naga"	June 13, 2007
Josh joins a team of paranormal investigators in Thailand's Khon Kaen province to hunt ghosts reported by villagers, and later he hunts for the Phaya Naga, a nāga-like serpent lurking in the Mekong River near the Laos border.
3	3	"Ropen & Chupacabra"	June 20, 2007
Josh returns to Papua New Guinea, this time he is in search of a nocturnal, Pterodactyl-like creature called the Ropen. Next, he heads to Chile to find the legendary Chupacabra, a blood-sucking creature with glowing red eyes.
4	4	"Bigfoot & Nahuelito"	June 27, 2007
Josh goes to Malaysia's Endau Rompin National Park to look into reports of Bigfoot sightings, then later, he goes to Argentina to find a lake monster called Nahuelito, reminiscent of Nessie that is supposedly lurking in Nahuel Huapi Lake.
5	5	"Mamlambo & Tokeloshe"	July 11, 2007
Josh goes to South Africa and investigates the banks of the Mzintlava River where a horse-headed fish creature called the Mamlambo reportedly lurks. Then, Josh is off to Lesotho in search of the Tokoloshe, an ape-like being with enormous eyes said to appear and vanish like a ghost.
6	6	"El Lobizon & El Pombero"	July 18, 2007
In Argentina, Josh searches for werewolves, which are of such a concern that the Argentinian president supposedly baptizes the seventh son born in a family to purge the curse. Afterward, Josh checks out reports near the same area, of a dwarf-like creature called El Pombero which is said to impregnate women with a single touch on the belly.

=== Season 2 (2008) ===
No. overall	No. in season	Title	Original release date
7	1	"The Yeti"	March 5, 2008
Josh and team head to Mount Everest in Nepal to search of the Bigfoot-like creature known as the Yeti.
8	2	"Haunted Island & Devil Worm"	March 12, 2008
Josh and team go to the African island of Pemba which is reportedly haunted by the tortured spirits of former slaves. Then, he's off to the Gobi Desert to hunt for the Mongolian Death Worm, a creature, 4 feet (1.2 m) long, that reportedly secretes acid and shoots electricity.
9	3	"Wild Man & Swamp Dinosaur"	March 19, 2008
Josh goes to Cambodia in search of ape-like wild man that supposedly held a local village girl captive for 18 years. Next, he ventures to Zambia to hunt down a sauropod dinosaur called the Mokele-Mbembe, said to be living in the swamps around Lake Bangweulu.
10	4	"Sea Monster & Bat Demon"	March 26, 2008
Josh goes to Vietnam's Halong Bay in search of the Tarasque, a sea serpent described to be 98 feet (30 m), and later he goes to the African island of Zanzibar in search of the Popobawa, a bat-like creature that is said to attack people at night.
11	5	"Flying Dinosaur & Sloth Monster"	April 2, 2008
Josh goes into the Amazon rainforest in search of the Mapinguary, a giant ground sloth-like creature that is depicted as having a single eye, a mouth located on its stomach, and emitting a foul odor. Afterward, he returns to Zambia in search of the Kongamato, a Pterodactyl-like creature that reportedly attacks people in their homes at night.
12	6	"Giant Anaconda"	April 9, 2008
Josh and team spend two nights along the Amazon River in Brazil, in search of giant anacondas reportedly 60 feet (18 m) or more in length, and powerful enough to kill an ox.
13	7	"The Yowie & Haunted Mosque"	September 3, 2008
Josh and team explore the Blue Mountains region near Sydney, Australia to find evidence of a Bigfoot-like creature called the Yowie. Afterward, the team camps out at an allegedly haunted mosque deep in the Malaysian jungle to record evidence of paranormal activity.
14	8	"Orang Pendek & Worm Monster"	September 10, 2008
Josh and team search for the elusive Orang Pendek, a 3-foot-tall (0.91 m), bipedal, primate said to lurk somewhere on the Indonesian island of Sumatra. Later, he searches for the monstrous Lagarfljót Worm supposedly lurking in Iceland's Lake Lagarfljót.
15	9	"Haunted Cave & Burrunjor"	September 17, 2008
In Indonesia, Josh and team go ghost hunting in a cave that is rumored to be haunted and that local villagers are afraid to enter. Afterward, they go in search of the Burrunjor, what local aborigines and cattle ranchers claim is a carnivorous bipedal lizard, 25 feet (7.62m) long that stalks the Australian outback.
16	10	"Ahool & Pinatubo"	September 24, 2008
Josh and team explore the Indonesian island of Java in search of the Ahool, a giant bat creature that reportedly has a 12 feet (3.7 m) wingspan. Next, he enters the rain forests of the Philippines, risking capture by armed rebels and exposure to mercury-contaminated water to find the Pinatubo, a strange river creature.
17	11	"Aswang & Haunted Forest"	October 1, 2008
Josh and team go on the hunt in the Philippines for the mythical Aswang, devilish ghouls that are said to haunt an old tree, take the form of various animals, and attack those who enter a nearby church. Later, Josh goes to the Aokigahara forest of Japan, located at the base of Mount Fuji, where countless people have gone to commit suicide.
18	12	"Issie & Icelandic Elves"	October 8, 2008
Josh goes in search of Japan's version of the Loch Ness Monster which is called Issie and supposedly lurks in Kyūshū Island's Lake Ikeda. Then, on to Iceland in search of the Icelandic Elves, rock dwelling little people, first appearing in Viking legends and still believed by some of Iceland's population to exist today.
19	13	"Ninki Nanka & Kikiyaon"	October 15, 2008
Josh and team conduct a simultaneous investigation in The Gambia as they try to hunt down two mythical creatures at once; the Ninki Nanka – a giant, dragon-headed lizard and the Kikiyaon – a giant owl creature.

=== Season 3 (2009–10) ===
No. overall	No. in season	Title	Original release date
20	1	"Haunted Forest/Alux"	September 9, 2009
Josh and his team conduct their first investigation into ghosts said to haunt Romania's Hoia Baciu Forest, and the evidence is later analyzed by TAPS founders, Jason Hawes and Grant Wilson, of Ghost Hunters. Afterward, Josh investigates the legend of the goblin-like Alux in Mexico's state of Yucatán.
21	2	"Island of the Dolls/Lusca"	September 16, 2009
Josh ventures to a Mexican island to investigate a haunting attributed to a drowned girl and the evidence is later analyzed by TAPS members Steve Gonsalves and Dave Tango of Ghost Hunters. Next, Josh goes in search of the Lusca, a giant octopus rumored to lurk in the blue holes of Andros Island in the Bahamas.
22	3	"King Tut's Curse/Swamp Ape"	September 23, 2009
Josh and team conduct the first ever nighttime, ghost hunting investigation of King Tutankhamun's Tomb in Egypt's Valley of the Kings near Luxor. Next he conducts the show's first stateside investigation into the swamps of Florida's Big Cypress National Preserve to search for a legendary primate creature called the Skunk Ape.
23	4	"Ghosts of Chernobyl/Sal'awa"	September 30, 2009
Josh goes on a dangerous ghost hunting investigation into the radioactive ruins of Pripyat, Ukraine near the Chernobyl Nuclear Power Plant and the evidence is later analyzed by Jason and Grant from Ghost Hunters. Afterward he goes to an Egyptian village in search of a wolf-like creature called the Sal'awa that locals claim is responsible for attacks upon children.
24	5	"Alien Mummies/Lake Van Monster"	October 7, 2009
Josh and team explore a mine in northern Chile that is connected with UFO activity where tiny, unidentified, humanoid corpses are claimed to have been found. They themselves find an unrecognizable corpse and give it to local authorities. Later, the team journeys to Van, Turkey following recent reports and an eye-witness video of a large creature living in Lake Van.
25	6	"Chullachaqui/Bermuda Triangle"	October 14, 2009
Josh goes to Peru to hunt for a devil-like creature called the Chullachaqui with Ghost Hunters International investigators, Robb Demarest and Dustin Pari joining the expedition. Next, he investigates magnetic anomalies in the Bermuda Triangle that focus the team on the mysterious and widely shunned island of Bimini.
26	7	"Haunted Lost City/Thunderbird"	October 21, 2009
Josh and his team travel to Peru to investigate a lost Incan city with reports of ghostly activity and the video evidence is later reviewed by Steve and Tango of Ghost Hunters. Next, the team searches the arctic wilderness near the remote village of Manokotak, Alaska for a giant avian locals describe as a Thunderbird.
27	8	"Werewolf/Arica Monster"	October 28, 2009
Josh goes to the Transylvania forests of Romania in search of a legendary werewolf creature. Next, the team travels to Arica, Chile to hunt down an alleged Velociraptor-like dinosaur.
28	9	"The Bhutan Yeti"	November 4, 2009
Josh returns to Himalayas, this time to the Kingdom of Bhutan, on another hunt for the Yeti. Hair samples gathered during the investigation revealed DNA from an unknown primate adding to some of the best evidence yet for the existence of the creature.
29	10	"Ghosts of Masada/The Leprechaun"	March 17, 2010
Josh and team go ghost hunting in the ruins of Masada, Israel; a place where in 1st century AD, nearly 1,000 Jews committed mass-suicide to prevent capture by the Romans. The evidence is later analyzed by Jason and Grant from Ghost Hunters. Later, Josh journeys to Doolin, Ireland on the hunt for Leprechauns.
30	11	"Ghosts of the Great Wall/Israeli Mermaid"	March 24, 2010
Josh and team go ghost hunting along a portion of the Great Wall of China near Beijing and the evidence is reviewed by Jason and Grant from Ghost Hunters. Next, he and his team go looking for mermaids off the coast of Kiryat Yam, Israel, which offers a $1,000,000 reward for proof of the creature.
31	12	"The Jersey Devil/The Yeren"	March 31, 2010
Josh heads into New Jersey's Wharton State Forest and teams up with Kris Williams from Ghost Hunters to search for the legendary Jersey Devil. In the next segment, he and his team go to China's Hubei provence in search of a Bigfoot-like creature called the Yeren.
32	13	"Haunted Mining Town/The Taniwha"	April 7, 2010
Josh teams up with guest Allison Scagliotti of Syfy's Warehouse 13 and goes ghost hunting in two abandoned mining towns, Humberstone and La Noria, in northern Chile. Next, Josh goes to Rotorua, New Zealand to search for an eel-like monster called the Taniwha.
33	14	"Ghost of Petra/The Lizard Man"	April 14, 2010
Josh hunts for Djinn (Arabic for ghosts) that are said to haunt the ancient ruins of Petra in Jordan, and the evidence is reviewed by Jason and Grant from Ghost Hunters. In the next part, Josh visits Bishopville, South Carolina in search of the Lizard Man of Scape Ore Swamp.
34	15	"Spirits of Easter Island/The Moa"	April 21, 2010
Josh and his team seek out the spirits that are said to haunt the Moai statues of Easter Island. In the next segment, the team travels to New Zealand's South Island to investigate reported sightings of the extinct Giant Moa.

=== Season 4 (2010–11) ===
No. overall	No. in season	Title	Original release date	U.S. viewers (millions)
35	1	"Poltergeists of Pompeii/Nandi Beast"	September 9, 2010	N/A
Josh explores the volcanic ruins of Pompeii in search of spirits that may still echo the terrified screams of those who died during the 79 AD eruption of Mount Vesuvius. He later reviews the evidence with Jason and Grant from Ghost Hunters. In the next part, Josh and team visit Kenya in search of the brain-eating predator known as the Nandi Bear.
36	2	"Spirits of Angkor Wat/Canadian Lake Monster"	September 16, 2010	N/A
Josh and team try to attract paranormal activity with a sacred offering in the Cambodian temple of Angkor Wat. In the next segment, the team heads to Canada's Okanagan Lake in British Columbia, on the hunt for a famous lake monster known as Ogopogo.
37	3	"Ghosts of Haboro/Mngwa"	September 23, 2010	N/A
Josh goes ghost hunting in Haboro, an abandoned mining town on Japan's Hokkaidō Island. He later reviews the evidence with Jason and Grant from Ghost Hunters. In the next part, he travels to Tanzania in search of a Saber-toothed cat-like beast called the Mngwa.
38	4	"Ghost Fleet/Japanese River Monster"	September 30, 2010	0.936
Josh and team go to the Chuuk Islands of Micronesia to conduct the world's first underwater ghost hunt in the wrecks of Japanese warships sunk during World War II. The evidence is later reviewed with Jason and Grant from Ghost Hunters. In the next part, Josh goes to Japan in search of a turtle-like river monster called the Kappa which is popular in Japanese folklore.
39	5	"Siberian Snowman"	October 7, 2010	N/A
Josh and team trek into Russia's southern Siberian wilderness near Kazakhstan, on the hunt for the Almas - a large hominid described to be similar to the Yeti of Nepal, and Sasquatch of North America.
40	6	"Ghosts of Menengai Crater/Kalanoro"	October 14, 2010	N/A
Josh and team head to Kenya's volcanic Menengai Crater; an ancient tribal battleground that locals say is haunted with the restless spirits of native warriors. In the next part, the team goes to the island of Madagascar to look for a 3-foot (0.91 m) tall, humanoid creature, said to have backward feet, called the Kalanoro.
41	7	"Haunted Island Ruins/Moroccan Succubus"	October 21, 2010	N/A
By viewer request, Josh and team search for ghosts in the ruins of Nan Madol on the Micronesian island of Pohnpei. In the next part, the team travels into the Atlas Mountains of Morocco in search of a Succubus named Aisha Kandisha, who is said to appear as a beautiful woman with camel-like legs and a pair of bat-like wings.
42	8	"Guam Zombies/Fangalobolo"	October 28, 2010	N/A
Josh and team return to the island of Madagascar on the hunt for a giant bat-like creature called the Fangalobolo. Afterward, they go to the island of Guam to investigate sightings of ancestral spirits that live in banyan trees, which locals call the Taotao Mona. (These spirits are incorrectly portrayed as zombie-like in this episode.)
43	9	"Live From Ireland — The Search for the Banshee Ghost"	March 17, 2011	0.926
Josh conducts a live, four-hour ghost hunt at Duckett's Grove Castle in Carlow, Ireland with special guest investigators Kris Williams and Barry Fitzgerald of Ghost Hunters International, Jael de Pardo of Fact or Faked: Paranormal Files and Allison Scagliotti of Warehouse 13.
44	10	"Haunted Island Prison/Ucumar"	March 22, 2011	0.849
Josh and team go ghost hunting in an abandoned prison with a notorious history on the Panamanian island of Coiba and the evidence is reviewed by Kris Williams and Barry Fitzgerald of Ghost Hunters International. In the next segment, the team travels to Argentina on the search for a bear-like creature called the Ucumar.
45	11	"Sandstorm Spirits/Cerro Azul Monster"	March 29, 2011	0.910
Josh and team go ghost hunting in the abandoned desert town of Kolmanskop, Namibia with former team member and guest investigator Jael de Pardo of Fact or Faked: Paranormal Files. In the next part, Josh goes to Cerro Azul, Panama to investigate sightings of a strange, hairless creature that was photographed by a group of boys.
46	12	"Jungle Temple Ghosts/Namibian Night Stalker"	April 5, 2011	0.899
Josh and team go to Thailand in search of giant underworld spirits called the Phret that haunt the grounds of Phanom Rung temple and the evidence is reviewed by Kris and Barry of Ghost Hunters International. In the next part, Josh and team join up with Jael of Fact or Faked: Paranormal Files in Namibia's Etosha National Park, on the hunt for a blood-sucking predator dubbed the Night Stalker.
47	13	"Thai Tree People/Ayia Napa Monster"	April 12, 2011	1.018
Josh and team go to Thailand in search of the Naree Pon which are described as 3 feet (0.91 m) tall humanoid creatures that local villagers say are both plant and animal. In the next part, Team Truth heads to the Mediterranean island of Cyprus on the hunt for a sea monster in the waters around Cape Greco near Ayia Napa.
48	14	"Ghosts of Antarctica"	April 19, 2011	0.971
Josh and team set sail from Ushuaia, Argentina to Antarctica for a frigid ghost hunt in the ruins of a whaling village on Deception Island and an investigation inside the Wordie House; an abandoned British research building near Port Lockroy.

=== Season 5 (2012) ===
No. overall	No. in season	Title	Original release date	U.S. viewers (millions)
49	1	"Vietnam's Bigfoot"	July 10, 2012	1.066
Josh and team head into the dense jungles of Vietnam in search of an alleged Bigfoot-like creature locals call the Batutut. During the investigation, the team makes a cast of a footprint that is taken back to Idaho State University and examined by noted Anthropologist, Dr. Jeffrey Meldrum, who deems it a significant discovery.
50	2	"Return to the Haunted Forest/Belize Goblin"	July 10, 2012	N/A
Josh conducts a follow-up investigation into alleged spirits said to haunt the Hoia Baciu Forest of Romania. Former team member Evan, who was attacked by an unseen force in the first investigation (Season 3, Episode 1) returns to face his fears. In the next segment, the team travels to Belize in search for the Tata Duende, a small, goblin-like creature said to have backward-pointing feet.
51	3	"Ghosts of Cannibal Village/Kapre"	July 17, 2012	N/A
Josh and team travel to Suva, Fiji, to investigate the alleged spirits of Nabutautau, a former cannibal village once visited by an English missionary, Reverend Thomas Baker, who ended up as one of their victims. Next, the team heads to the Philippines to track down a dangerous ape-like jungle monster called the "Kapre" that has been terrorizing the native Aeta people for generations.
52	4	"Alien Invaders/Swedish Lake Monster"	July 24, 2012	N/A
Josh and team search for UFOs in the forests of Kazakhstan, where villagers from nearby Razdolnoye report seeing strange lights in the sky, vapor trails, flying saucers and mysterious creatures. In the next part, Team Truth tries to hunt down a 300-foot serpentine-like creature, Storsjöodjuret, that allegedly lurks in the frigid waters of Lake Storsjön near Svenstavik, Sweden.
53	5	"Spirits of Tikal/Creature from the Black Lagoon"	July 31, 2012	1.134
Josh and team visit Guatemala to hunt for restless spirits in the Mayan ruins of Tikal, a place known for human sacrifice rituals. Next, Team Truth returns to the island of Fiji, this time to investigate sightings of an amphibious monster that reportedly stalks the island's coast.
54	6	"Vampire Monster/Island of the Damned"	August 7, 2012	1.104
Josh and team travel to Transylvania to seek out a vampire creature that is terrorizing the villagers and killing their livestock. Next, they head to the lonely island of Blå Jungfrun in Sweden that is believed to be haunted by the ghosts of witches.
55	7	"Hanging Coffins/Kazakh Monster"	August 14, 2012	1.146
Josh and the team go to the remote village of Sagada, in the Philippines to investigate reports of paranormal activity around hanging coffins that are located on the sides of cliffs and in burial caves. Next, they travel into the Tien Shan Mountains in Kazakhstan in search of the "Kiyik Adam", a Central Asian version of Bigfoot.
