= Makonde art =

Genre of African art

The name Makonde art refers to East African sculptures or, less frequently, modern paintings created by craftspeople or artists belonging to the Makonde people of northern Mozambique and southern Tanzania, separated by the Ruvuma river. Traditionally, the Makonde have carved ornamental boxes and pipes, ritual objects, and ritual masks out of soft njala wood. Masks are a predominant form of Makonde art and are culturally important to ritual and tradition. After colonialization, the Makonde people began to carve masks that were adapted for Western tastes.

The Western categorization of Makonde art can be traced back to the 1930s, when the first documented exhibition of Makonde art was held at the Centro Cultural dos Novos in the former Portuguese colony of today's Mozambique. Art historians, dealers and collectors have subdivided the genre into African traditional artifacts and modern artistic works.

== Makonde Masks ==
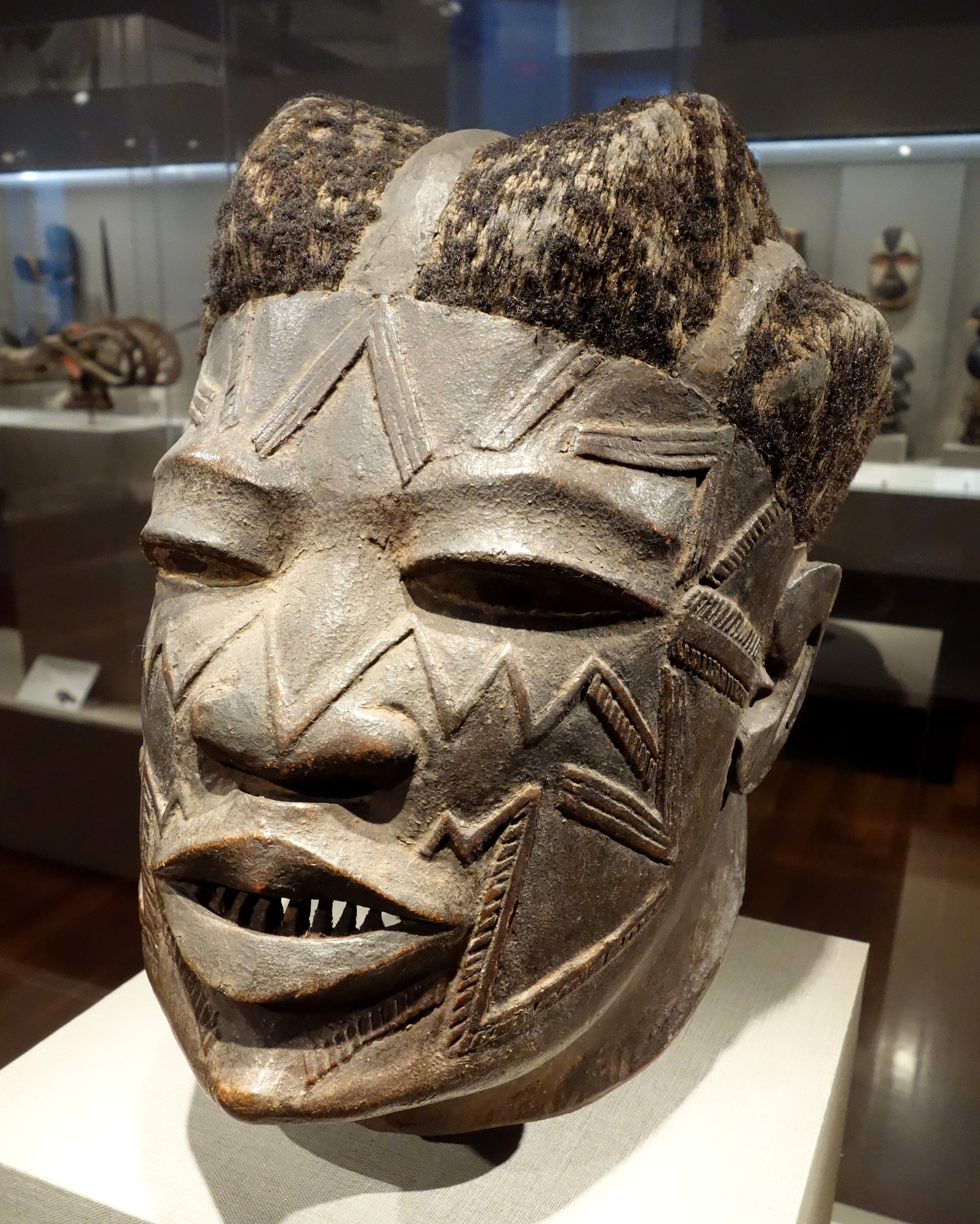
Helmet mask, Mozambique, Makonde people, early 20th century, wood, beeswax, hair

A special genre of traditional ritual Makonde art is the characteristic Mapiko masks (singular: Lipiko). These have been used in tribal dances accompanying coming-of-age rituals since before contact with missionaries in the 20th century. These masks represented shetani spirits, ancestors, or living characters (real or idealized). The masks were made of both hard or soft wood, and often included hair or fibers, where hair would go. The masks include beeswax patterns to represent scarification. Makonde masks may have human or animal features, or a combination of both. Makonde masks depicting females include lip plugs and ear spools, while male masks include facial hair. 'Devil masks,' depicting malevolent spirits, are typically human faces with the inclusion of horns.

== Rites of passage ==
The purpose of the masks was to characterize evil spirits during rites of passage ceremonies. Most notable are male initiations into adulthood, which are marked by circumcision. At the beginning of this rite, a ritualist dance, the Mapiko, is performed. Throughout this dance there are three active parts: A masked dancer representing a dead man who has come to haunt the village, the Mashapilo, or an evil spirit seeking to spread malice and disrupt health, and lastly, the young man undergoing this transition into manhood, who is to conquer these entities. Both of the masked dancers are symbolic expressions of the evil that must be faced and defeated by the young man. The boys then receive the circumcision ritual, and are subsequently taken away from the group and taught their societal duties as men. Ceremonies for girls also include ritualist dance and isolation, however, woodcarvings are only present once a woman is married. Once a Makonde woman marries, she will carry around a carved wood doll to promote fertility.

== Post-Colonialization ==
In the 1930s, Portuguese colonizers and other missionaries arrived at the Mueda plateau in Northern Mozambique. After the introduction of road systems in the plateaus between Tanzania and Mozambique by Portuguese troops during World War I, the traditional practices began to shift to meet new social and economic demands. Portuguese forced labor and taxes had prompted Makonde carvers in Mozambique to expand past the practices of traditional woodcarving. The Portuguese showed great interest in the Makonde wood carvings and began to order different pieces, from religious pieces to political “eminences.” The Makonde sculptors began to carve sculptures in a new style, using pau-preto (ebony wood, Diospyros ebenum) and pau-rosa (Swartzia sapini) instead of the soft wood they had used before.

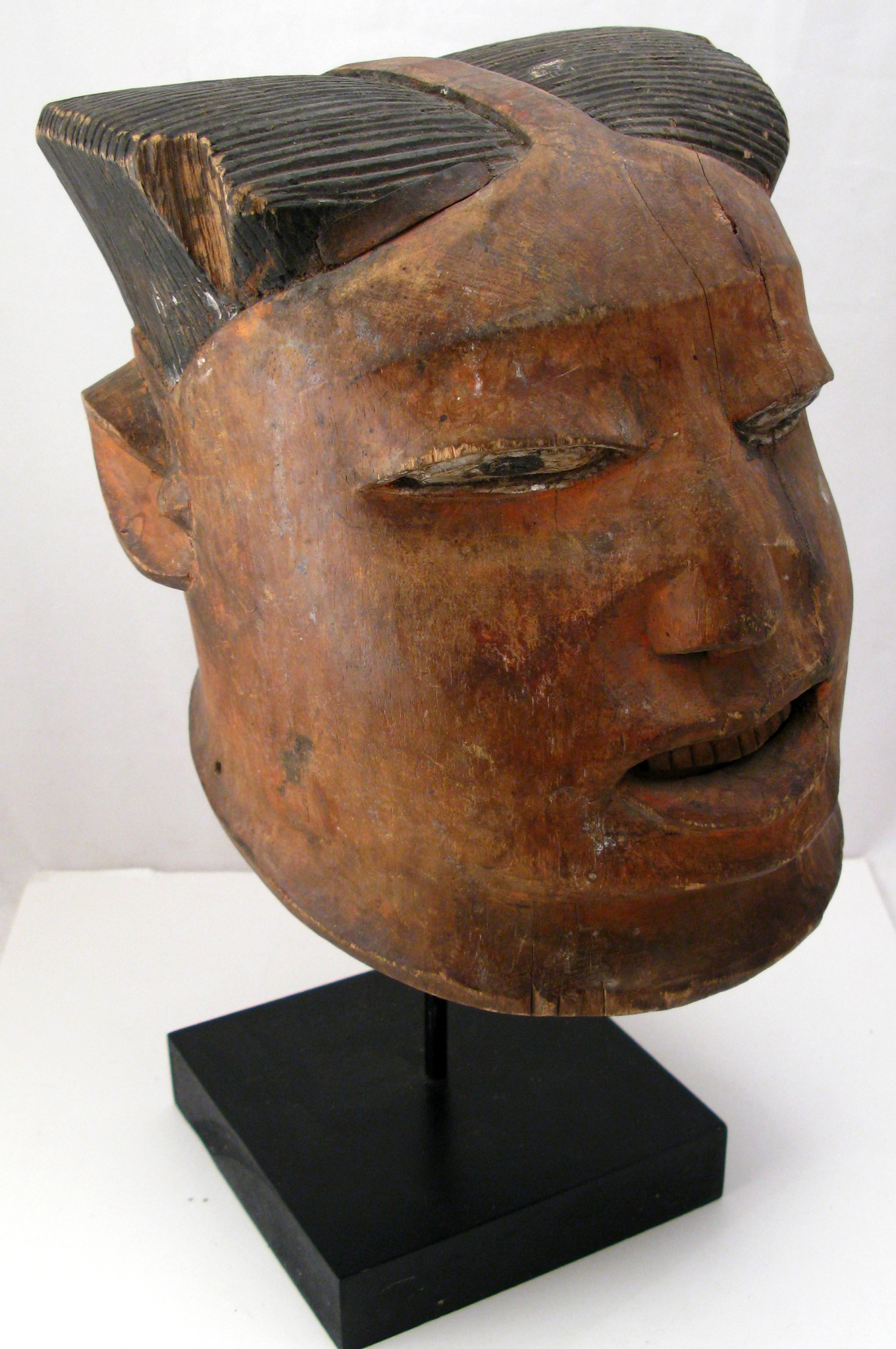
Traditional Lipiko mask

Since the 1930s, the Modern Makonde Art has been developing in Tanzania. An essential step away from the traditional sculptures was the creation of abstract figures, called Shetani in Swahili language, representing mostly evil spirits. The shetani play a special role in Swahili popular beliefs. This shetani style was created in the early 1950s by master carver Samaki Likankoa. Likankoa's patron, Mohamed Peera, an art curator in Dar es Salaam, played an instrumental and decisive role in further influencing the modern Makonde art movement. Some Makonde sculptors, including George Lugwani, have embraced a fully abstract style of carving without discernible figures. Since the 1970s, Modern Makonde Art has become part of the internationally recognized contemporary art of Africa. One of the most acknowledged artists is George Lilanga, who started with carvings and became famous as a modern painter.

Makonde sculptors originally from Mozambique, but displaced in Tanzania, supported the resistance towards colonial regime in Mozambique. As early as 1959, Makonde people in Dar es Salaam helped create a nationalist organization (MANU) that later became part of the Mozambique Liberation Front (FRELIMO). Supporting the fight for liberation, Makonde sculptors created cooperatives and made financial contributions by selling their artworks for the struggle for liberation in Mozambique. Referring to notions of modern Makonde carvers as traditional, rural people, a Portuguese study from 2020 said: "To generically place the Makonde artists in isolation, in the corner and in the bush, is a Western paternalist fiction."

== Types of Modern Makonde art ==
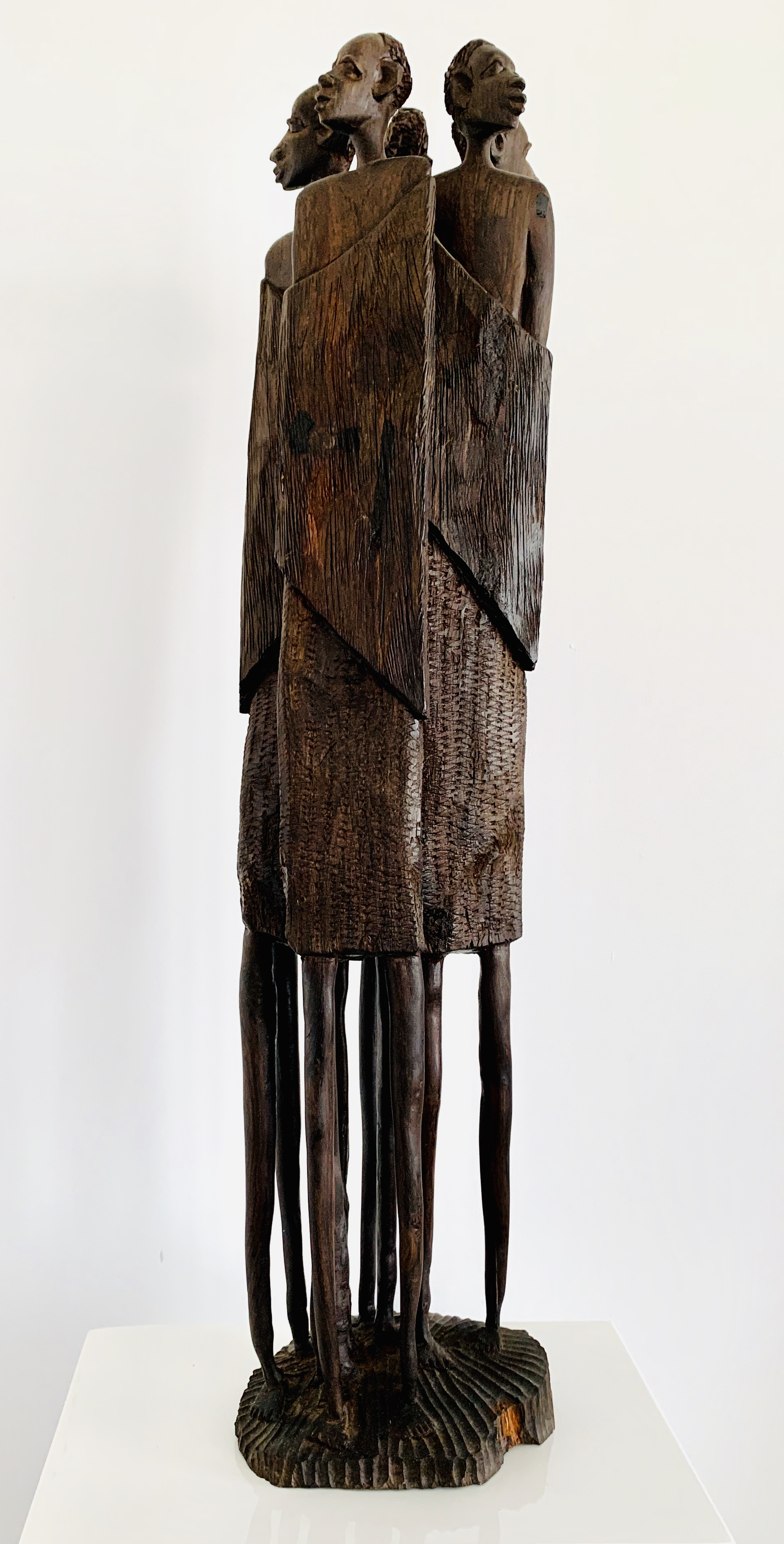
Modern Ujamaa sculpture

=== Ujamaa or Tree of life ===
Roberto Yakobo Sangwani left his home Mozambique and headed for Tanzania in the late 1950s. With him he brought a style of Makonde art formally known as Dimoongo, meaning ‘power of strength’ or ‘tree of life’. Traditionally these sculptures portrayed clusters of connected wrestlers holding up a winning victor. Gradually, the main figure shifted to represent tribal heads or people in unity with community members or family. Regardless of who the central figure of a sculpture is, the organization of this style represents one central figure, surrounded by and supported by other figures. These figures exemplify ujamaa (communal unity) or relationships in a community and bring forth the underlying reverence the Makonde have for their ancestors or society.

=== Shetani ===
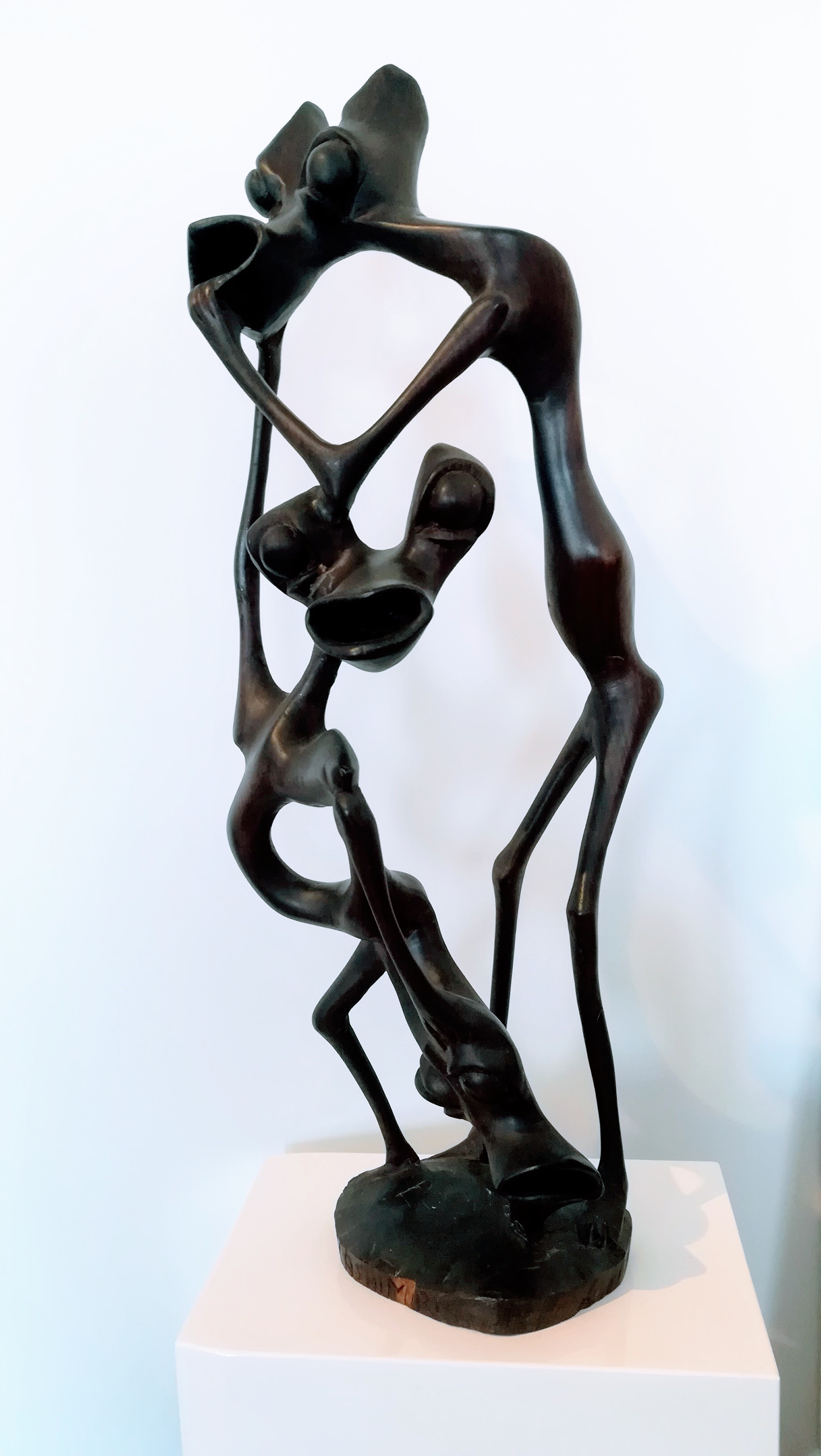
Modern Shetani sculpture

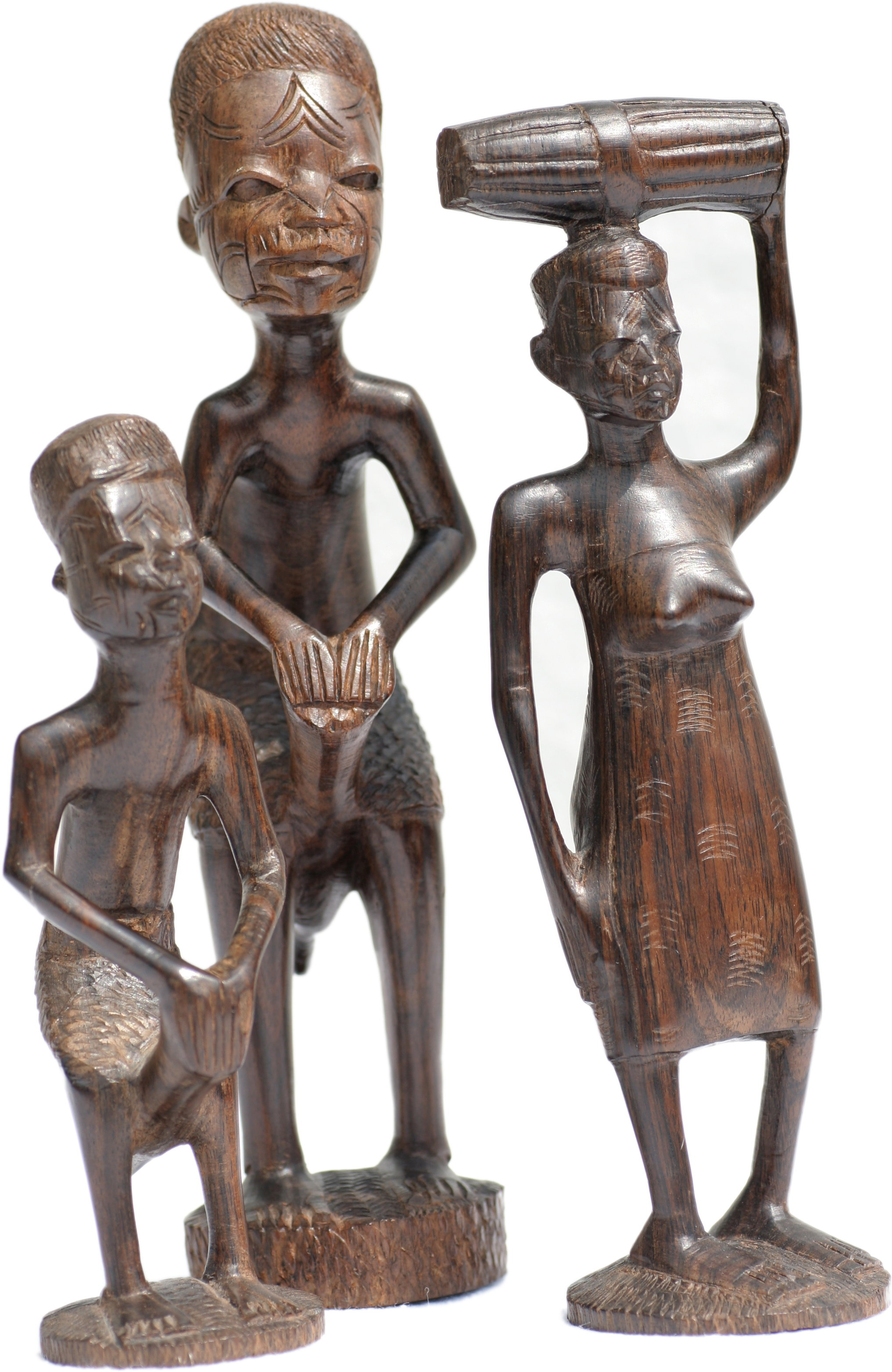
Modern Binadamu sculptures

Shetani style woodcarvings (“devil” in Swahili) are expressions of Makonde mythology and spirits. This style uses the appearance of otherworldly physical traits, like large, distorted facial or body features, sometimes of animals, to signify the spiritual realm. The essence of Shetani is thought to take five forms: human, mammal, fish, bird, and reptile. In some sculptures, there are also culturally significant symbols, like a mother's breasts or calabashes, used to carry water.

=== Binadamu ===
Binadamu, a naturalistic type, captures the essence of Makonde social roles. Most common are depictions of men smoking and women fulfilling household chores. After Portuguese occupation, many locals began to prioritize the craft and create figures embodying the daily lives of Makonde men and women to appeal to Western taste.

== Gallery of modern Makonde carvings ==
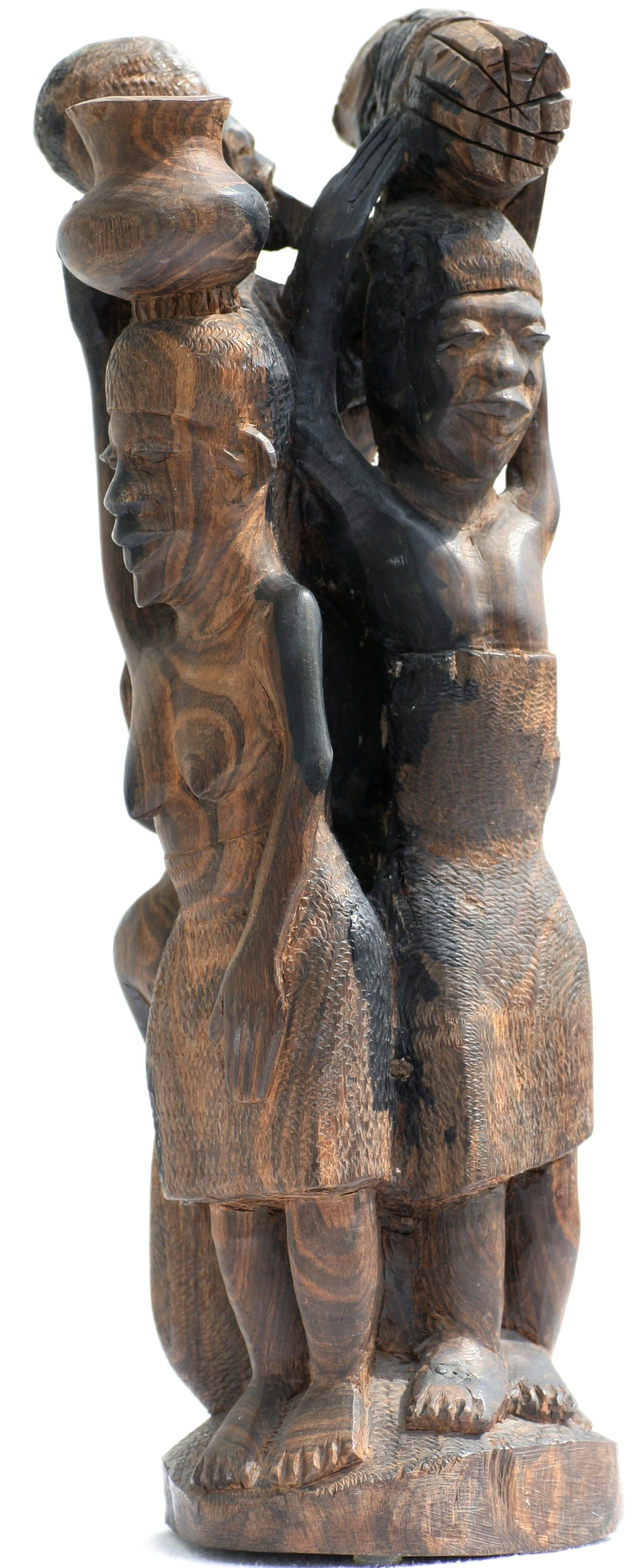
Makonde Binadamu sculpture

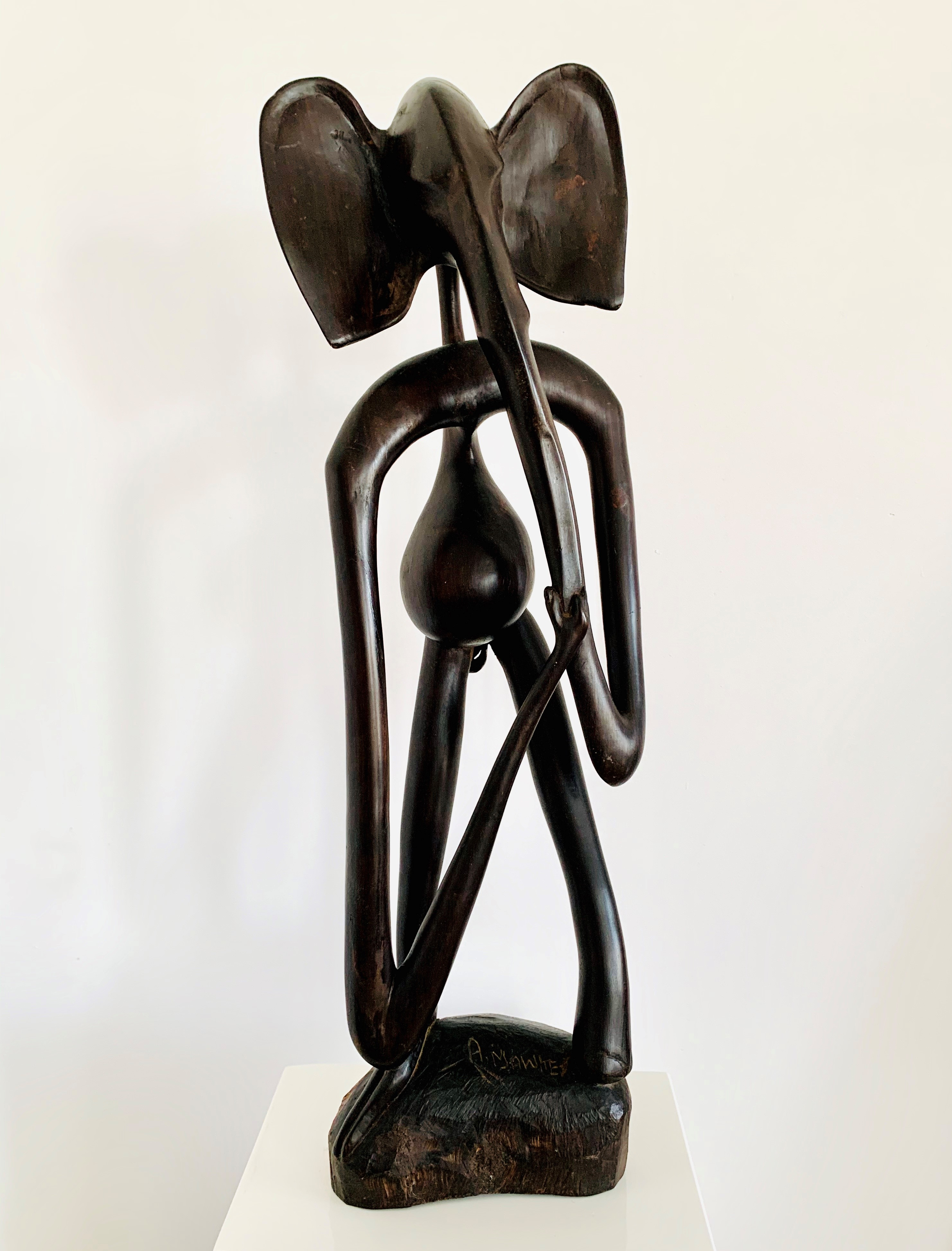
Makonde Shetani sculpture

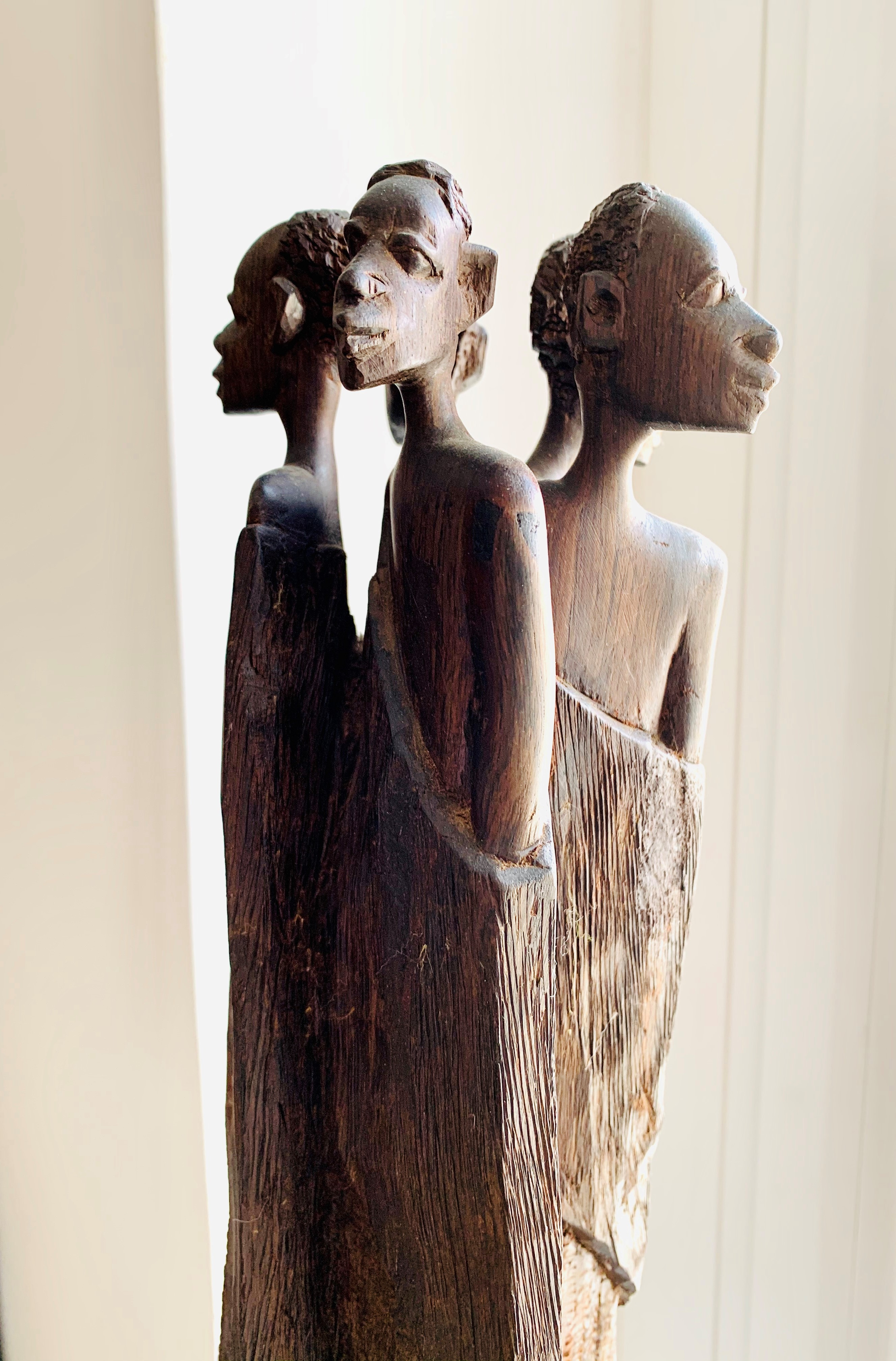
Makonde Ujamaa sculpture detail

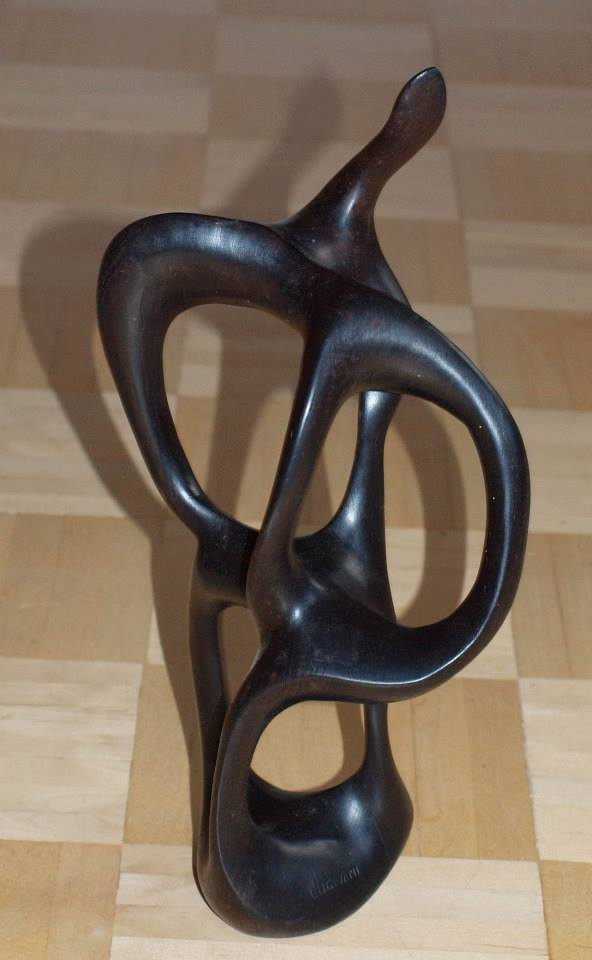
An abstract carving by George Lugwani in mpingo

== See also ==
- Makonde chess set
- Contemporary African art
- Culture of Tanzania
- Makonde Art Museum
