= Nyumba ya Sanaa =

Cultural centre in Dar es Salaam, Tanzania,

Coordinates: 6.809700904°S 39.28699872°E

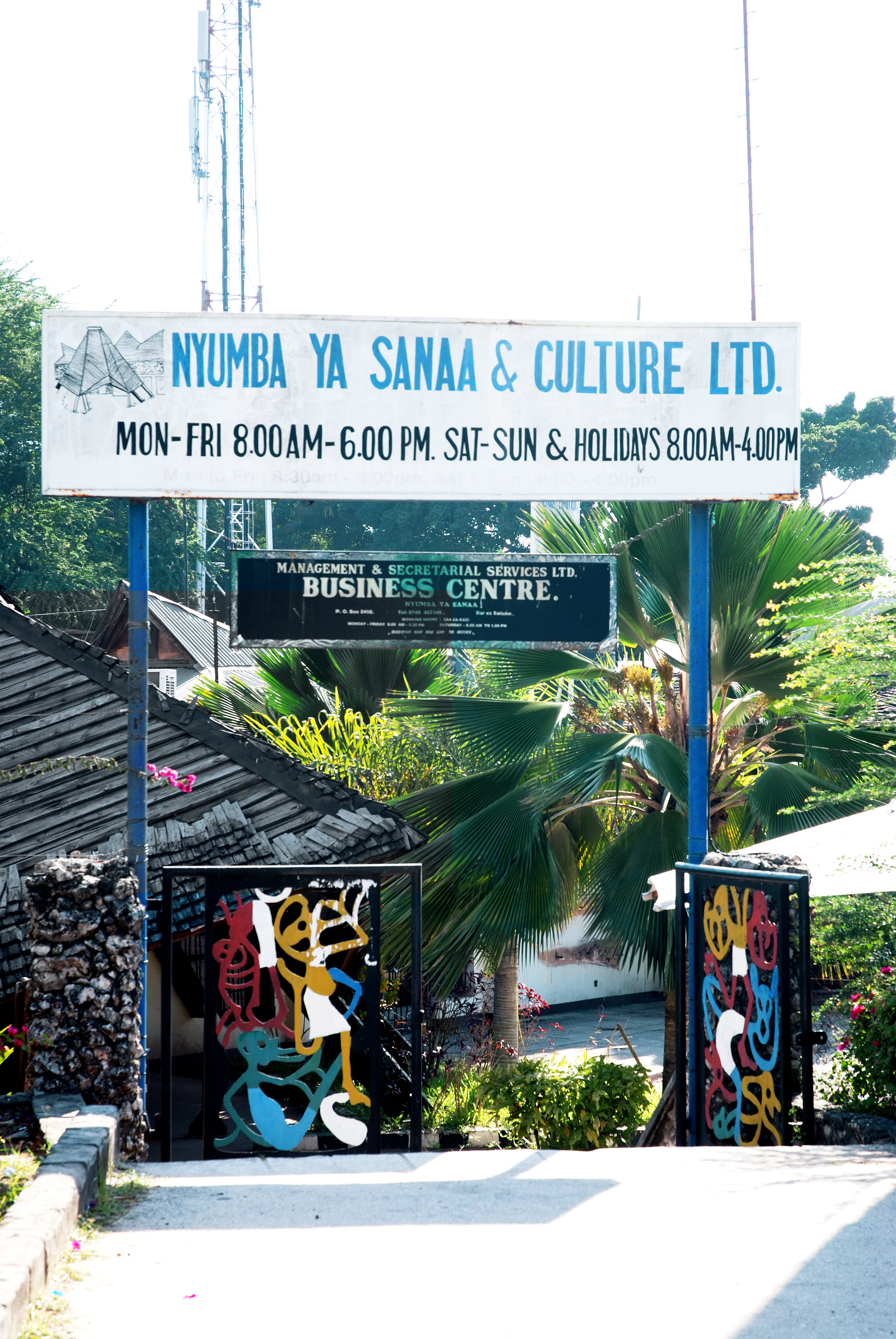
The entrance of the former Nyumba ya Sanaa, with sculptures by George Lilanga

Nyumba ya Sanaa (Swahili for 'House of Art'), also known as the Mwalimu Nyerere Cultural Centre or Julius Nyerere Cultural Centre, was a cultural centre, art workshop and art gallery in Dar es Salaam, Tanzania. It was established in 1972 to promote local modern art and artistic craftsmanship. Situated in a privileged location, it was replaced in 2010 by a tower building with residential and commercial facilities.

== History and artistic importance ==
With political support by former president Julius Nyerere, Nyumba ya Sanaa was founded by the US-American Maryknoll Sister Jean Pruitt in 1972 as a place to support local artists by organizing workshops, exhibitions and sale of their works. The centre also staged dance and music exhibitions and was a popular visitor attraction in Dar es Salaam.

Painter and sculptor George Lilanga, one of the most famous and internationally acclaimed Tanzanian artists, began his career at the centre. Parts of the building, as well as its main entrance gates, were decorated by Lilanga. After it was destroyed to make room for a modern business tower, sculptures of shetani figures that were included in these gates were bought and restored by a German collector. They are documented in the book George Lilanga: The Doors of Nyumba ya Sanaa. Other notable Tanzanian artists who worked at Nyumba ya Sanaa included Augustino Malaba, Patrick Francis Imanjama, or Robino Ntila.

At the end of 2016, Lebanon Valley College in Pennsylvania, USA, presented a traveling exhibition from Syracuse University Art Galleries, entitled Nyumba Ya Sanaa: Works from the Maryknoll Collection with artworks by 22 Tanzanian artists - including prints, drawings, watercolors, sculptures, and textiles, that were donated by the Maryknoll Sisters. Some of the artists featured were George Lilanga, Augustino Malaba, Robino Ntila, Chanuo Maundu, Patrick Francis Imanjama, Dastan Nyedi and Edward Francis Kiiza.

== See also ==
- Culture of Tanzania
