= Chess or the King's Game =

Book by August van Brunswijk-Wolfenbüttel

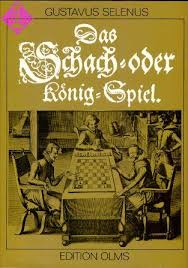
- Author: Duke Augustus of Brunswick
- Publication date: 1616

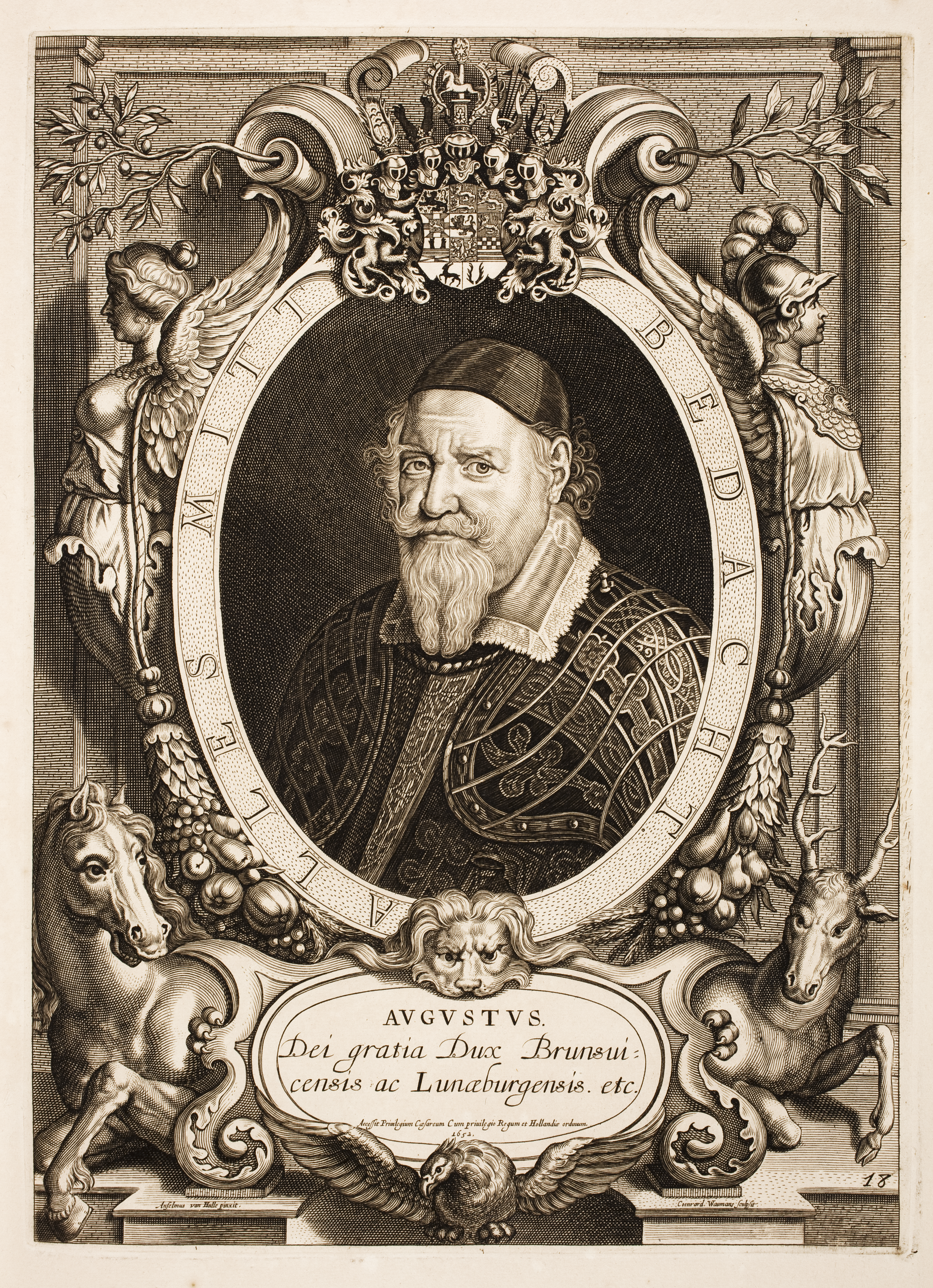
Duke Augustus of Brunswick-Lüneburg, 1717 engraving after Anselm van Hulle

Chess or the King's Game (German: Das Schach- oder Königsspiel) is a book on chess. It was published in Leipzig in 1616 under the name of Gustavus Selenus ("Gustavus" being an anagram of "Augustus" and "Selenus" referring to the Greek moon goddess Selene, linked to the Latin origin of the name "Lüneburg"), the pen name of Duke Augustus of Brunswick-Lüneburg (1579–1666). As a young prince, Augustus probably had learned of the game during his voyages to Italy and purchased numerous chess books from the Augsburg merchant and art collector Philipp Hainhofer. The first textbook on chess in the German language, the work is mainly based on the Libro de la invencion liberal y arte del juego del axedrez written in 1561 by the Spanish priest Ruy López de Segura, but also contains extensive philosophical and historical considerations (e.g. on the "chess village" of Ströbeck).

In addition to chess instruction, the book contained interesting illustrations of contemporary German chess pieces by Jacob van der Heyden et al. The usage for chessmen at the time tended to favor slender designs with nested floral crowns. The book was so successful that pieces of this pattern became known as the "Selenus chess sets”. Over time, pieces became taller, thinner, and more elaborate. Their apparent floral nature lead some to name them "Garden chess sets" or "Tulip chess sets". Selenus pattern sets were commonly made in Germany and Central Europe until about 1914 when they were completely eclipsed by the more playable and stable Staunton chess set pattern, which was introduced in 1849 by manufacturer Jaques of London.

== See also ==
- Courier Chess
