= Makonde chess set =

20th century chess pieces based on east African art

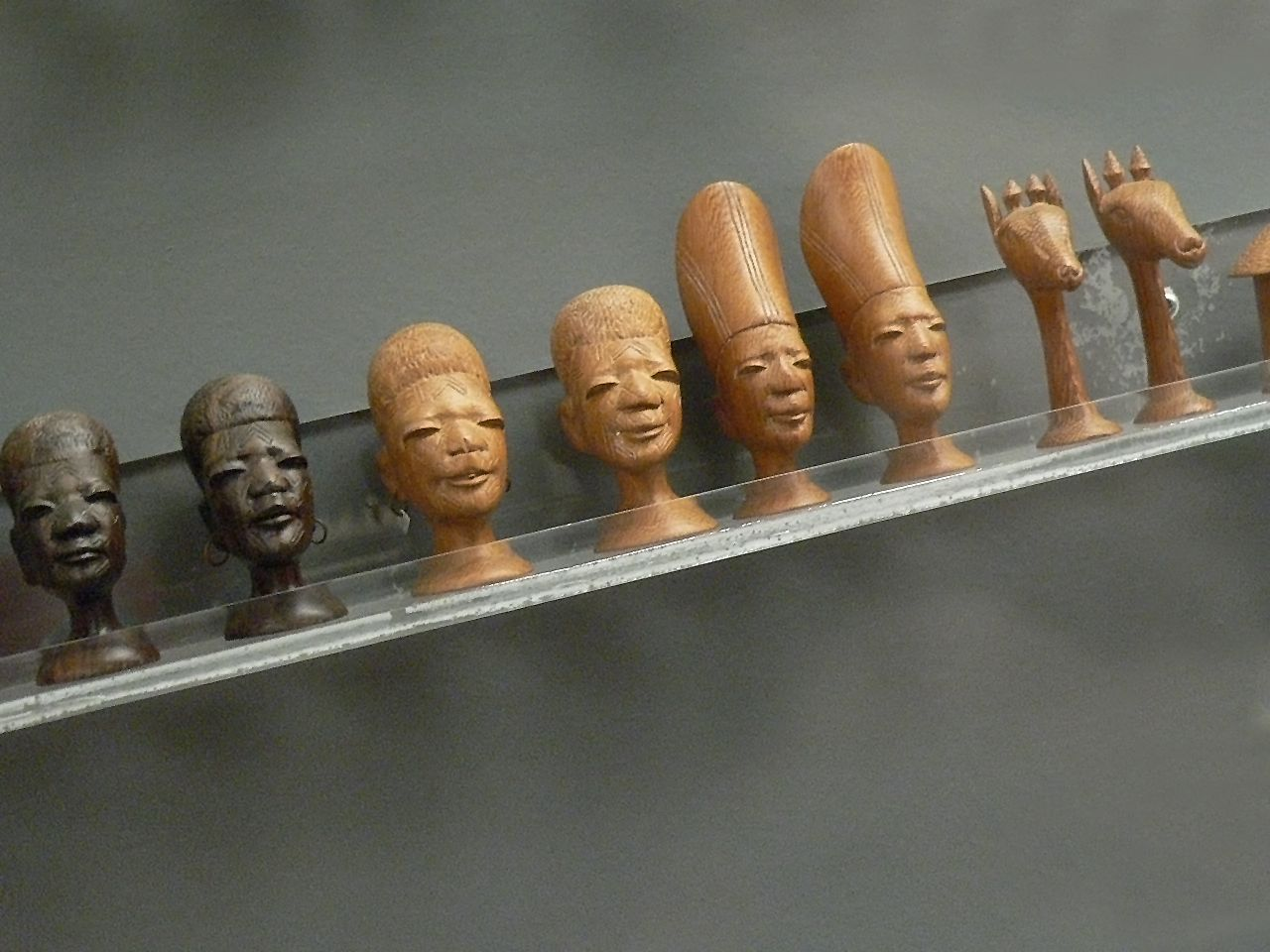
20th century Makonde chess set in African blackwood and blond hardwood

Makonde chess sets are made by the Makonde people of southwest Tanzania and Mozambique, carved in the Makonde's distinctive style. Chess sets were originally made for export to Europe but the pattern of the pieces follows traditional Makonde designs rather than any established chess pattern.

== History ==
The European market for Makonde art developed from the 1930s through Portuguese colonization. Chess sets were first exported by Norman Kirk, a New Zealander who owned a lime and cashew nut plantation in Tanzania (then Tanganyika). Kirk had been impressed by the work of the Makonde artist Likenikeni Sabini after visiting his workshop at Ndanda mission in the 1950s. After this visit he began buying and exporting Makonde art to Europe. Kirk enticed Sabini to come and work for him at his plantation where Sabini trained other carvers for Kirk. At some point Kirk initiated production of chess sets and the product became popular in the 1960s. The pieces in the chess set were based on the chidiu, a traditional bottle stopper. This took the form of a human head with Makonde facial scarification.

After Kirk's death in 1969 a group of carvers who had formerly supplied Kirk continued to carve chess sets. This group was centred on the village of Ziwani near Mtwara. Several new themes were developed by this group including the seated smoker set, the drummer set, and the bird set. Scarification marks tend to be omitted on modern pieces.

== Description ==
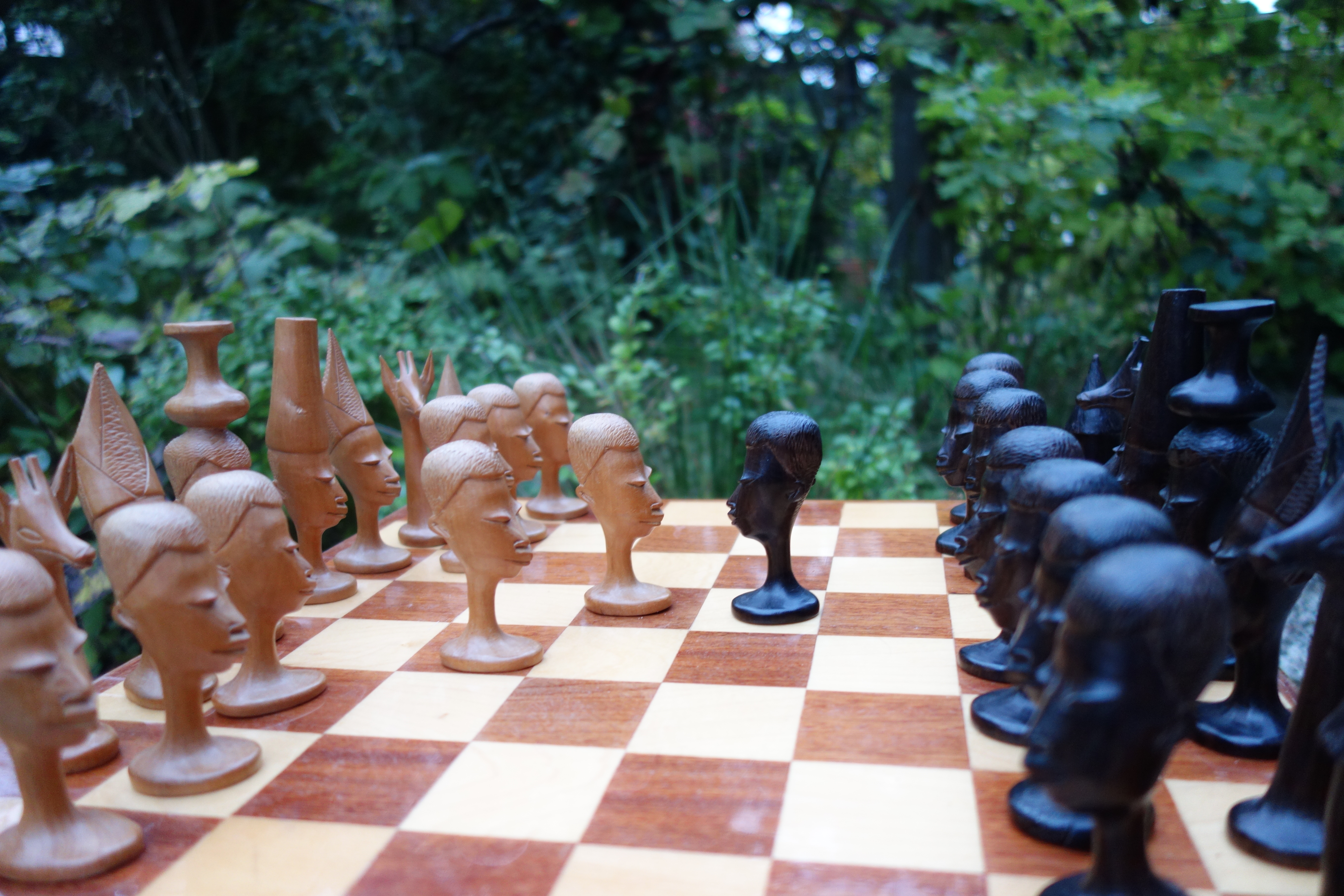
Makonde chess set

The king (bulisa), as the tallest piece, has a very tall African tribal hat worn by tribal chiefs. Alternatively, the hat may be a fez of the type formerly worn by colonial police and soldiers. The king always has this hat even in sets which do not take human form. The queen, as representative of women (nkongwe), carries a water pot on her head which is the custom in rural Africa. The knight is in the style of a giraffe (twiga); horses were unknown to the tribe as they cannot survive in this part of Africa because of the tsetse fly. Among the best of Makonde skills are carvings of animals. As there were no castles in Makonde territory, they designed the rook in the shape of a grain store representative of the importance of a good grain harvest, or sometimes as a tribal hut (ng'ande). Both of these represented security. The bishop (chikopa) has a traditional bishop's mitre headgear (possibly due to European influence) but without the facial scarification of the other characters. In some carvings the bishop appears as a witch doctor (native to 19th century east African culture). The pawn is carved in the style of an ordinary Makonde tribesman.

Makonde chess sets are usually carved from african blackwood, known as mpingo (the black pieces) and a kind of rosewood (the white pieces). Chess sets of this style are still carved in Tanzania and Mozambique.

== See also ==
- Dubrovnik chess set
- Selenus chess set
- Staunton chess set

== Bibliography ==
- Zachary Kingdon, A Host of Devils: The History and Context of the Making of Makonde Spirit Sculpture, Routledge, 2013 ISBN 1136476660.
