= Popobawa =

Urban legend

Popo Bawa
Creature information
- Other name: Winged Bat
- Grouping: Spirit
- Sub grouping: Shetani
- Similar entities: Incubus

Origin
- First attested: Pemba Island (1965)
- Country: Zanzibar, Tanzania

Popobawa, also Popo Bawa, is the name of an evil spirit or shetani, which is believed by residents of Zanzibar to have first appeared on the Tanzanian island of Pemba. In 1995, it was the focus of a major outbreak of mass hysteria or panic which spread from Pemba to Unguja, the main island of the Zanzibar Archipelago, and across to Dar es Salaam and other urban centres on the East African coast.

== Meaning of the name ==
Popobawa is a Swahili name which translates literally as "bat-wing" (from Swahili popo, "bat", and bawa, "wing"). This name is said to have originated as a description of the dark shadow cast by the spirit when it attacks at night: it does not refer to the actual form of the spirit, which is liable to change. Swahili speakers also use a plural form of the name – mapopobawa – to refer to multiple manifestations of the feared spirit. This plural is anglicized as "Popobawas".

== Description and behaviour ==
Popobawa is a shapeshifter and described as taking different forms, not just that of a bat as its name implies. It can take either human or animal form, and metamorphose from one into the other. Popobawa typically visits homesteads at night, but can also be seen in the daytime. It is sometimes associated with the presence of a sulfurous odor, but this is not always the case. Popobawa attacks men, women and children, and may attack all of the members of a household, before passing on to another house in the neighbourhood. Its nocturnal attacks can comprise simple physical assault and/or poltergeist-like phenomena; But most feared is sexual assault and the anal rape of men and women.

Victims are often urged to tell others that they have been assaulted, and are threatened with repeat visits by Popobawa if they do not. During Popobawa panics many people try to guard against attack by spending the night awake outside their houses, often huddled around an open fire with other family members and neighbours. Panics occur most often in Zanzibar, throughout the island of Pemba and in the north and west of Unguja island, including Zanzibar City. Episodes have also been reported in Dar es Salaam and other towns on the mainland coast of Tanzania.

== Origin and history ==
As legendary creatures go, Popobawa is of fairly recent origin.

Sightings of the popobawa only go back about sixty years; Parkin states that the first reports date back to 1965 on the island of Pemba, appearing shortly after that island's political revolution. Better-known sightings followed in 1970, and the creature resurfaced periodically in the 1980s, reaching a peak in 1995. Five years passed without a sighting, but the popobawa appeared briefly in 2000 and again in 2007.

A popular origin story of Popobawa proposes that in the 1970s an angry sheikh released a Jinn to take vengeance on his neighbors. The sheikh lost control of the jinn, who took to demonic ways. It has been argued that because of Zanzibar's past as an Arab-run slave market, the story of Popobawa is an articulated social memory of the horrors of slavery (Parkin 2004). Many of the legends on Zanzibar came from the colonizers and traders of the past, including Arabs, Portuguese, Indians, Chinese, Britons, Persians and Africans.

== Modern Popobawa panics ==
Reports of Popobawa attacks rise and fall with the election cycle in Zanzibar, although victims argue Popobawa is apolitical. Popobawa reports rose dramatically relatively recently, in 1995. A further spate of attacks was reported in Dar es Salaam in 2007. One explanation put forth for the election cycle connection is the claim that the Popobawa is the vengeful ghost of the assassinated President Abeid Karume, or was summoned by the Chama Cha Mapinduzi political party.

Villagers maintain that Popobawa becomes enraged if his existence is denied. Popobawa allegedly spoke to a group of villagers on Pemba in 1971 through a girl possessed by the monster. The girl, called Fatuma, spoke in a man's deep voice and then villagers say they heard the sound of a car revving and rustling on a nearby roof. Many of those on the islands believe in exorcisms, and place charms at the base of fig trees, or sacrifice goats.

Benjamin Radford interviewed doctors at Zanzibar Medical Group (Zanzibar's main hospital) and none reported ever treating popobawa victims.

After the incidents involving Popobawa in 1995 were reported an article was published in the Skeptical Inquirer by Joe Nickell regarding the phenomenon. In the article Nickell compared the experiences described of a visit from Popobawa with the symptoms of a waking dream, also known as sleep paralysis or a hypnopompic or hypnogogic hallucination. Nickell went on to describe some of the symptoms of a waking dream as including "a feeling of being weighted down or even paralyzed. Alternately, one may "float" or have an out-of-body experience. Other characteristics include extreme vividness of the dream and bizarre and/or terrifying content". Nickell also compared these symptoms with those experienced by people who claim to have been attacked by incubi, succubi or Hags from western folklore, and in more modern cases, with alien abductions. A book released in 2017 entitled "Popobawa: Tanzanian Talk, Global Misreadings" by Katrina Daly Thompson was critical of Nickell, claiming that he was "associating Zanzibaris with fear and Westerners with skepticism". Nickell responded that he agrees "Westerners should be wary of imposing simplistic patterns on another culture, but they also should not shy away from making scientific observations where appropriate".

== In popular culture ==
- It was also in the show The Secret Saturdays in the episode "The King of Kumari Kandam".
- In 2008, it was featured in an episode of the American paranormal reality television series Destination Truth titled Bat Demon.
- In 2022, the popobawa and his sexual proclivities are retold in great detail in the Hammer of Zanzibar segment of Satanic Hispanics.
- In The Dollop podcast, episode #4 - Ghosts, Popobawa is discussed as an example of supernatural folklore and legends.

== See also ==
- Incubus
- Madam Koi Koi
- Orang Minyak
- Sleep paralysis
