= Makonde Art Museum =

Museum of art in Ise, Mie, Japan

- マコンデ美術館
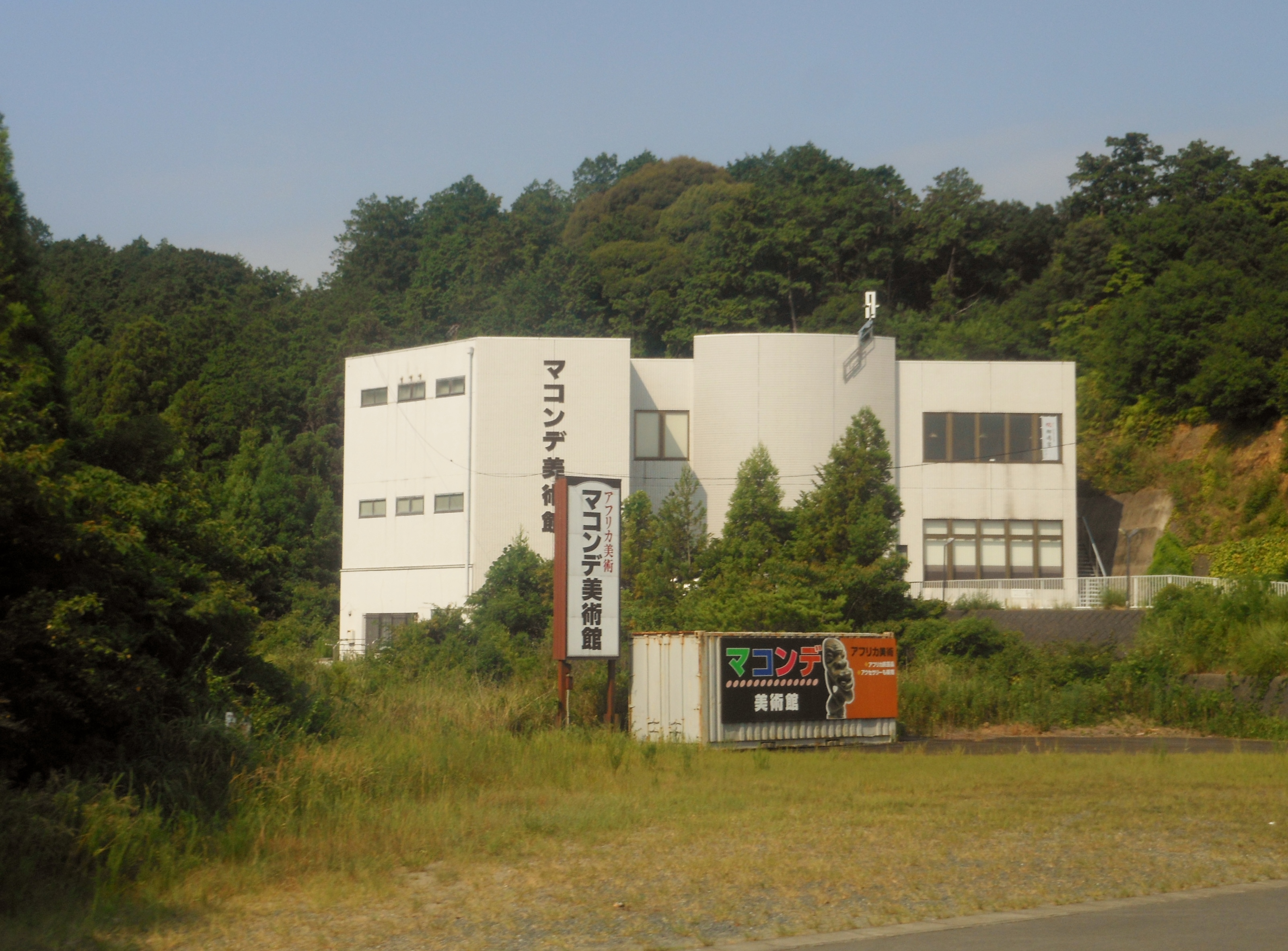
- Interactive map of the Makonde Art Museum area

General information
- Location: 1799-4 Matsushita, Futami-chō, Ise, Mie Prefecture, Japan
- Coordinates: 34°29′27″N 136°48′42″E
- Opened: 1984

Website
- Official website

Makonde Art Museum (マコンデ美術館, Makonde Bijutsukan) is a private museum of Makonde art that opened in Japan in 1984, reopening in its current location in Ise in 1991. The collection includes sculptures, Tingatinga-school paintings, batik, musical instruments, and other folk materials.

== See also ==
- Ise-Shima National Park
- Futami-ga-ura
- Makonde people
