= Selenus chess set =

Style of chess set

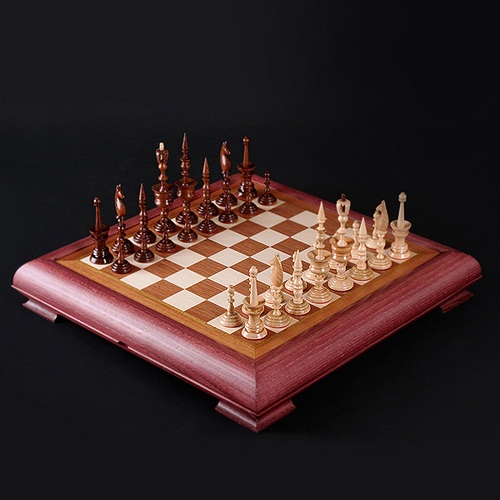
Selenus chess set

The Selenus chess set is a style of chess set in use before the standardization of chess pieces that happened after the Staunton chess set was launched in 1849 by games manufacturer John Jaques of London. The Selenus sets were typical of Germany and Northern Europe and are named after Gustavus Selenus, the pen name of Augustus the Younger, Duke of Brunswick-Lüneburg, author of Chess or the King's Game (German: Das Schach- oder Königsspiel), an important chess manual published in the 17th century. The standard included delicate lathe-turned bases and shafts and tiers with circlets resembling crowns. Pieces were distinguished by heights, the number of tiers and sometimes by symbols.

These chessmen are also called Garden chess sets because their theme frequently consisted of "formal flower gardens" – kings and queens were fountains; bishops and pawns were flowers; knights were gentle horses; and rooks became civic towers instead of battlements. In England they were frequently called Tulip chess sets.

== See also ==
- Dubrovnik chess set
- Makonde chess set
- Staunton chess set
