= George Lilanga =

Tanzanian painter and sculptor (1934–2005)

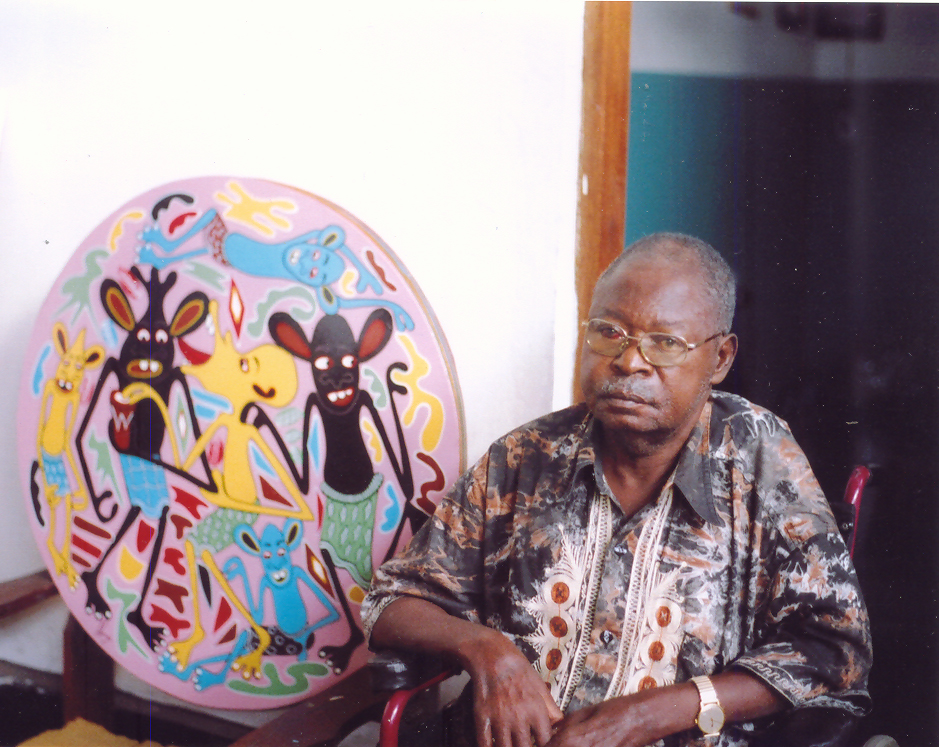
George Lilanga with one of his paintings by the title: we ndizi anangalia ulimi wangu, unawasha ("Banana look at me, I have the mouth-watering")

George Lilanga (1934 – 27 June 2005) was a Tanzanian painter and sculptor, active from the late 1970s and until the early 21st century. He belonged to the Makonde people and lived most of his life in Dar es Salaam, the largest city in Tanzania.

Alongside other African contemporary artists, his work was exhibited in international art shows, including Africa Remix 2004 or African Art Now in 2005. Through these exhibitions and the ensuing interest of art critics and collectors of contemporary African art, Lilanga became the internationally most renowned artist of Tanzania.

In the beginning, he worked in the Makonde artistic tradition of carving sculptures from wood. After having been exposed to other modern artists at the cultural centre Nyumba ya Sanaa (House of Art), he transformed typical sculptural forms into two-dimensional art works like paintings, etchings or panels. With this innovation, he developed his own style out of the Shetani (devils) figures of the modern Makonde sculptures. His paintings are characteristic for his colourful and ironic style, reflecting everyday life in Tanzania as he saw it.

== Biography ==
The exact place and date of Lilanga's birth are uncertain, although he said that he was born in 1934 in the village of Kikwetu, Masasi district, in the Mtwara Region of southern Tanzania.

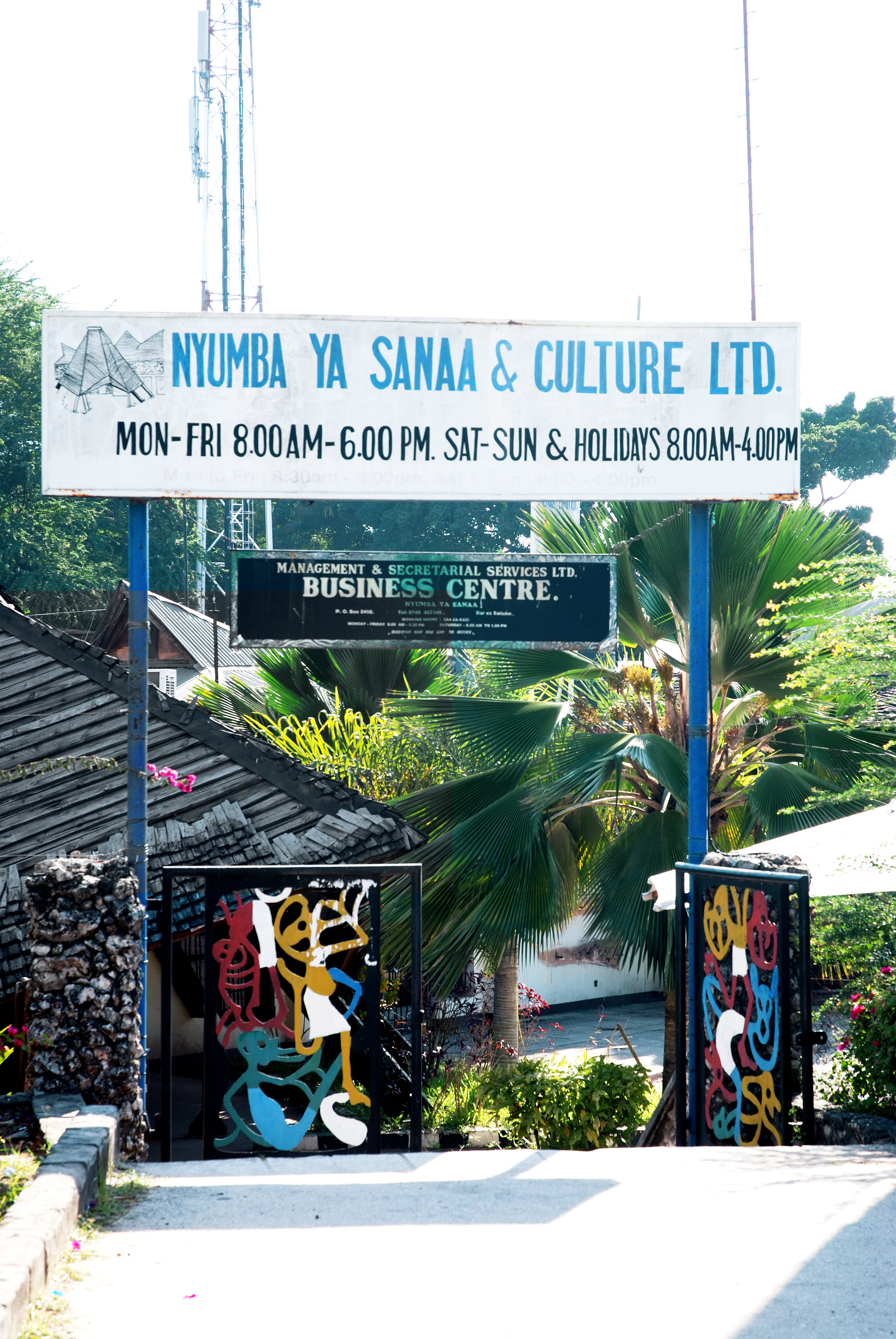
The main gate of the Nyumba ya Sanaa cultural centre in Dar es Salaam with sculptures by Lilanga

George Lilanga (right) and fellow painter Patrick Francis Imanjama outside Nyumba ya Sanaa

Lilanga's parents were both Makonde (an ethnic group living both in Mozambique as well as Tanzania). His father was an agricultural labourer, who worked on the sisal plantations, and he had two brothers, who died before him. Lilanga attended primary school for only three years. In the works of his latter years, which were dedicated to village life, he returned many times to representation of his memories of happy moments, when school students received their diplomas.

In 1970, Lilanga decided to move to Dar es Salaam, where there were greater opportunities for selling sculptures and practising contemporary art. In 1971, he found his first employment, thanks to his uncle, Augustino Malaba, an already well-known sculptor, who would be his future collaborator. He started as a night guard at the House of Art (Nyumba ya Sanaa), a cultural centre for the development of African art and craftsmanship in Dar es Salaam. In 1982, he created wooden doors with colourful bunk shetani figures for this cultural centre. After the Nyumba ya Sanaa was destroyed, these doors were bought and restored by a German collector and are documented in the book George Lilanga: The Doors of Nyumba ya Sanaa.

As a modern artist in his own right, he joined other artists like Robino Ntila, Augustino Malaba and Patrick Francis Imanjama. He also began to create paintings on batik cloth, on goatskin and on metal sheets for the finishing of railings and gates of the centre.

Like other modern Tanzanian artists, Lilanga frequented the art circles of the increasingly successful Tingatinga school, but always maintained his own style. After 1972, he became essentially a painter, and some of his works were presented at Dar es Salaam's National Museum in 1974.

Lilanga's talents were recognized by Maryknoll Sister Jean Pruitt, an American aid worker promoting Tanzanian art. In 1977, he made his first journey outside Africa, travelling to New York, where he had a show at the Maryknoll Sisters' Ossining Center in New York State. He stayed for a brief time in Manhattan, selling prints made on paper or cardboard, standing on street corners.

== Health issues and death ==
In 1974, he was diagnosed with diabetes mellitus. "I was always very tired, unable to follow my normal daily routine. Therefore, I decided to go in for a complete checkup in the local hospital. On that occasion, the doctors determined that I had diabetes."

In the late 1990s, his diabetes worsened with severe complications. Lilanga was forced to reorganise his work, putting together an atelier that included numerous young pupils and his own relatives, who were also sculptors and painters. They were closely supervised by Lilanga, and began to take over part of the work that Lilanga could no longer easily do by himself.

In 2000, the combination of diabetes, high blood pressure and heart disease led to a rapid deterioration in Lilanga's health. Due to gangrene, in October 2000 his right leg had to be amputated. In December of that year, the left leg was also amputated. Lilanga thus had to use a wheelchair; but after returning to his home in January 2001, he resumed his work.

In 2001, due to his serious physical impairments, he returned to small works with ink on paper and small goatskins 22.5 x 22.5 cm in size, which could be done more quickly and easily. With the assistance of his atelier, however, he also continued to create paintings of considerable size, and until shortly before his death, he produced large canvases, Masonites and tondos.

Lilanga died on Monday 27 June 2005, in Dar es Salaam, in his house-atelier at Mbagala.

== Artistic development & success ==
Shortly after beginning grammar school, Lilanga had his first contact with wooden sculpture, made from roots, softwood and, later, ebony, and working in the Makonde tradition. He dedicated himself almost exclusively to this technique from 1961 until 1972. He showed his first works to Europeans who worked in the refugee camps during Mozambique's war of independence. Following their advice, in 1970 Lilanga decided to move to Dar es Salaam, where there were greater opportunities for selling sculptures.

In 1978, he participated in a collective exhibition of African artists in Washington D.C. Of the 280 works presented, about 100 were by Lilanga. It was on this occasion that he was compared with Jean Dubuffet. Lilanga was considered to have had an influence on the young American graffiti artists (Keith Haring said in an interview that he had been influenced by Lilanga's art). Lilanga began a long series of exhibitions. His works had increasing success in Africa, Europe, the US, India, and Japan.

In the 1980s, Lilanga participated a few times in the Salzburg Summer Academy in Austria. There he learned the graphic method of etching, which became an important pictural experience for his later coloured art works. Subsequently, he dedicated himself almost exclusively to painting. His many pictures showing Shetani in different situations were represented two-dimensionally on Masonite (inexpensive panels made from wood fibre pressed, frequently used in African dwellings for stopping up attic roofs and as insulation), or on canvas, batiks, and goat skin.

In the 1990s and with growing international recognition, his paintings became increasingly larger (from this period are his oils on canvas about one square meter in size, his first large canvases over 200 centimetres in length and 61x122-centimeter works on Masonite/Faesite). During this period, after a break of many years, and at the end of the 1990s, he began working intensely again with sculpture, creating a large number of carvings in soft wood (usually mninga or mkongo), vividly coloured with oil-based enamels.

== Legacy ==
George Lilanga's colourful artworks underscore a whimsical evolution from traditional Makonde art, which is the source of the shetani fantastic creatures, depicted in virtually all of Lilanga's paintings and sculptures. Traditionally, Makonde sculptors choose the finest woods for their pieces and would frown upon painting over the woods' natural textures. The bright enamel multi-colour painting technique pioneered by Lilanga gives his pieces a more contemporary aesthetic appeal and developed into a personal style that has made them popular with collectors and art dealers. As a result, Lilanga became a reference in African art and enjoyed considerable commercial success in the latter part of his life, and prices for his pieces were further boosted after his death in 2005.

However, many pieces have been attributed by gallerists to George Lilanga-based solely on their 'Lilangalike' appearance. Because pieces sold as 'Lilangas' number in the many hundreds, it stands to reason that George Lilanga could not possibly have crafted them all himself, in particular in view of his frail health during the last decade of his life, when the bulk of such pieces was produced.

The reality was that George Lilanga mentored and inspired several artists who worked with him and capitalized on the value of the 'Lilanga' label. After George Lilanga's death, several of those artists and new ones continued to produce under the Lilanga attribution.

George Lilanga's art works can be found in leading international collections like The Contemporary African Art Collection (CAAC) of Jean Pigozzi or the Hamburg Mawingu Collection (HMC) of German collector Peter-Andreas Kamphausen. Shortly after the death of the artist, the HMC/George Lilanga Collection presented the first systematically and thematically complete catalogue of Lilanga's work. In addition, the book explores the traditional roots of East African Makonde art, as well as four decades of Lilanga's artistic development with different materials and techniques, including sculpture, paintings, etchings, drawings, and metal works. Currently the HMC publish the George Lilanga News as an online blog with information about the artist, his art works, exhibitions, and other interesting background material. Also in 2005, the African Collection series (Skira Editore, Milan) published a well-illustrated book on Lilanga's work with useful information.

== Major exhibitions ==
Solo

- 2012 George Lilanga: Inside...Africa...Outside, Hamburg Art Week/Hamburg Mawingu Collection (HMC), Germany
- 2005 George Lilanga, Jamaica, Milan, Italy
- 2004 Tingatinga and Lilanga, Kouchi Prefecture Art Museum, Kouchi, Japan
- 2003 Lilanga d’ici et d’ailleurs, Centre Culturel François Mitterrand, Périgueux, France
- 2003 George Lilanga, Christa's Fine Tribal Art Gallery, Copenhague, Denmark
- 2002 George Lilanga, MAMCO, Geneva
- 1999 George Lilanga "Storie Africane", Franco Cancelliere Arte Contemporanea, Messina, Italy
- 1995 Lilanga Artist in Residence and Workshop, Hiroshima City Moderne Art Museum, Japan
- 1994–1995 Lilanga's Cosmos, Okariya Gallery

Group

- 2010 African Stories, Marrakech Art Fair, Marrakech
- 2007 Why Africa?, Pinacoteca Giovanni e Marella Agnelli, Turin, Italy
- 2006 100% Africa, Guggenheim Museum, Bilbao, Spain
- 2005 Arts of Africa, Grimaldi Forum, Monaco, France
- 2005 African Art Now : Masterpieces from the Jean Pigozzi Collection, Museum of Fine Art Houston, USA
- 2004 Africa Remix, Art contemporain d’un continent, in Paris, London, Düsseldorf and Tokyo
- 2003–2004 Latitudes, Hôtel de Ville, Paris, France
- 2002 Mapico Dance, MAMCO, Geneva, Switzerland
- 2000–2001 Shanghai Biennale 2000, Shanghai, China

== See also ==
- Contemporary African art
- Makonde art
- Culture of Tanzania
