= Dubrovnik chess set =

1950 chess set design

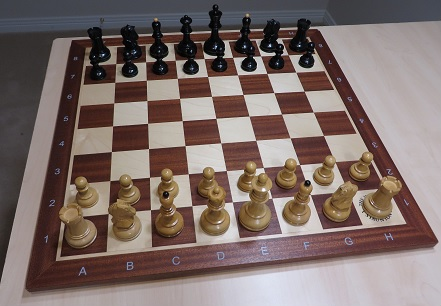
A 2014 House of Staunton Dubrovnik chess set

The Dubrovnik chess set is a style of chess pieces. These chessmen are considered to have significant historical importance and are regarded as a timeless design classic. Over the decades several variants of the Dubrovnik chessmen were designed.

== 1950 Dubrovnik chess set ==
The 9th Chess Olympiad was organised by the FIDE and the government of Yugoslavia, supported by Josip Broz Tito. The Olympiad was held in Dubrovnik, SR Croatia, Yugoslavia (now in Croatia), between August 20 and September 11, 1950. Chess is a significant part of the culture in Dubrovnik, being first documented in 1422. The Olympiad had 84 chess players representing 16 nations who played a total of 480 games. The Yugoslav team won the gold medal, Argentina silver and West Germany bronze.

In 1949, the Olympiad management requisitioned a new style of chessmen. Painter and sculptor P. Poček was contracted to design the Olympiad chessmen. The pieces were made in Subozan in Subotica, Yugoslavia.

The 1950 Dubrovnik chess set was designed without religious symbols. The pieces were designed for play with wide bases, requiring chessboard squares of at least 55 millimetres (2.2 in). They had green felted sliders and were not weighted. The chess box was felted with a metallic badge on the inside of the box with the inscription "IX. šah olimpijada Dubrovnik, Jugoslavija." The box was unusually large, featuring 60-millimetre (2.4 in) squares. Approximately 50 chess sets were made with original sets being very rare if not impossible to locate or buy.

In a radio interview Bobby Fischer stated: "This [1950 Dubrovnik chess set] is the best set I have ever played on. It is marvellous. I don't have it." A chess collector provided a chess set after Fischer requested it for the 1992 Fischer–Spassky rematch held in Sveti Stefan.

== Variants ==
The Dubrovnik design has influenced the creation of several chess set variants with a variety of names, including but not limited to, Zagreb and Yugoslavia. These variant chess sets often have opposite-coloured finials on the kings and queens, while the original Dubrovnik had opposite-coloured finials for the bishops. In addition, the chess sets use different specifications from the Dubrovnik.

In the 1960s a redesigned version by Andrija Maurović, a famous Croat cartoonist, writer and chess player was created and produced in the workshop of master craftsman Jakopović in Zagreb. Bobby Fischer was often filmed and photographed with his own 1970 Dubrovnik chess set that was later stolen. The most obvious changes in design can be observed in the knights with simplified carving, and the queens had only five cuts in the crown as opposed to the original eleven.

== 1970 variants ==
The initial 1950 Dubrovnik chess pieces, designed without spiritual symbols like a cross finial atop the king or a miter on the bishops, prioritized tournament practicality with broader, sturdier bases. The Dubrovnik chess set underwent a redesign for the 19th Chess Olympiad held at Siegen, West Germany, in 1970. This tournament gained fame for the showdown between Boris Spassky and Bobby Fischer, laying the groundwork for Fischer's 1972 World Championship match against Spassky.

This famous match, however, did not use the Dubrovnik set, but the Bohemian German chess set that has a cross finial on top of the king. The 1970 rendition of the Dubrovnik chessmen refined the knight's design and streamlined the overall appearance, resulting in a sleeker aesthetic. Fischer was widely photographed and recorded playing with his 1970s-era Dubrovnik set, notably captured in the HBO documentary Bobby Fischer Against the World.

== Gallery ==
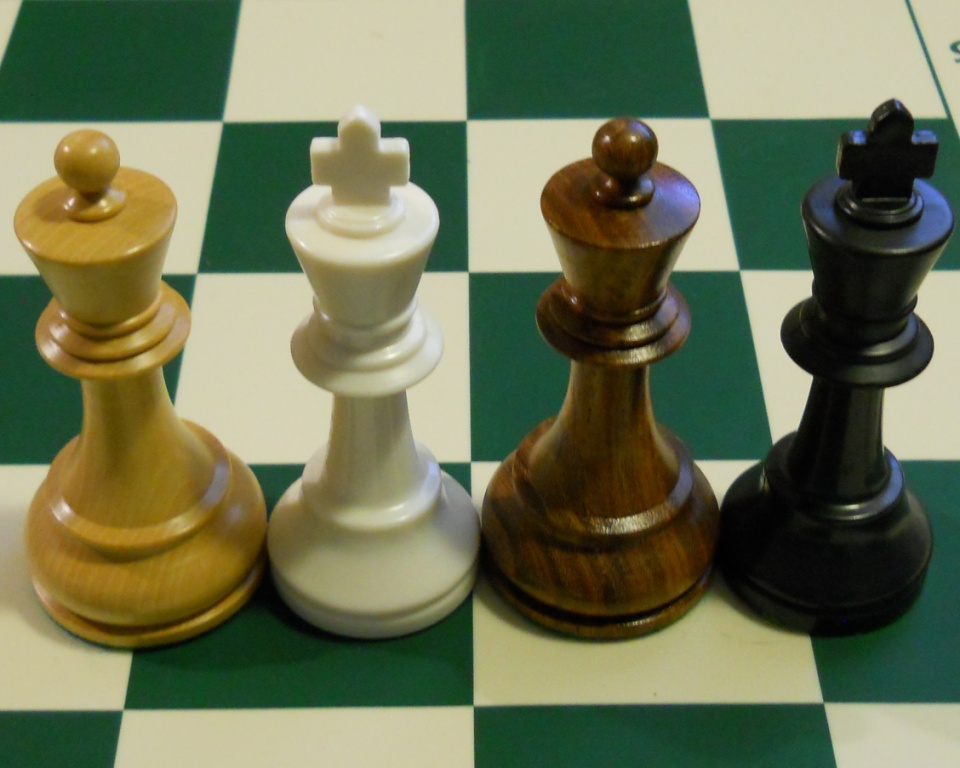
1950 Dubrovnik kings with Staunton kings side by side (from left: Dubrovnik, Staunton, Dubrovnik, Staunton)

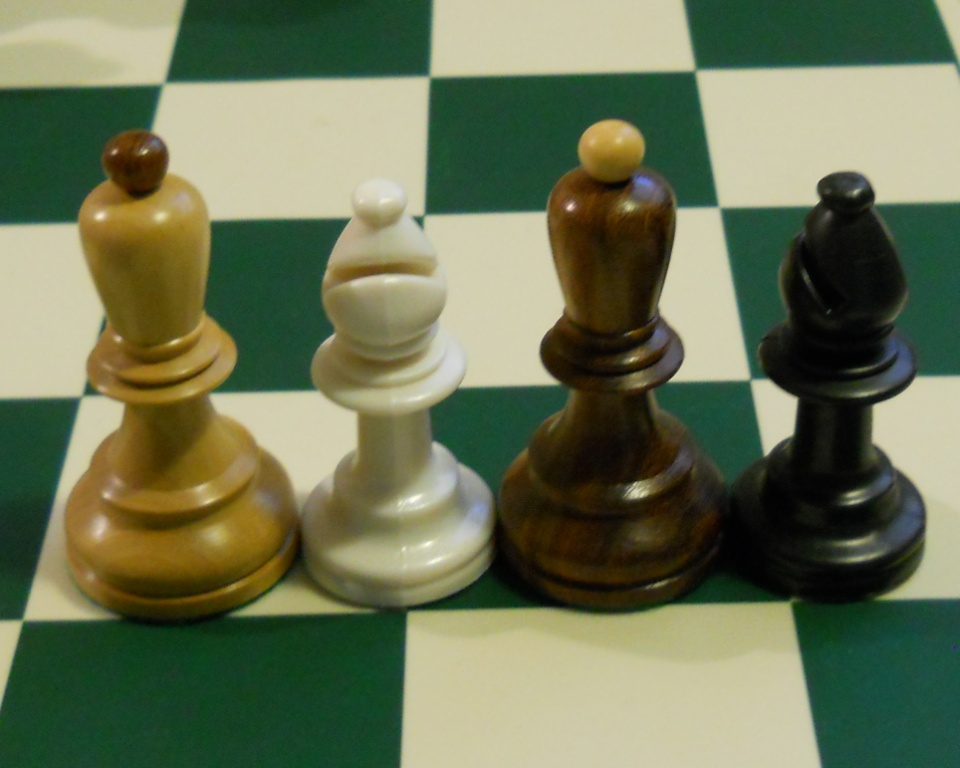
1950 Dubrovnik bishops with Staunton bishops side by side (from left: Dubrovnik, Staunton, Dubrovnik, Staunton)

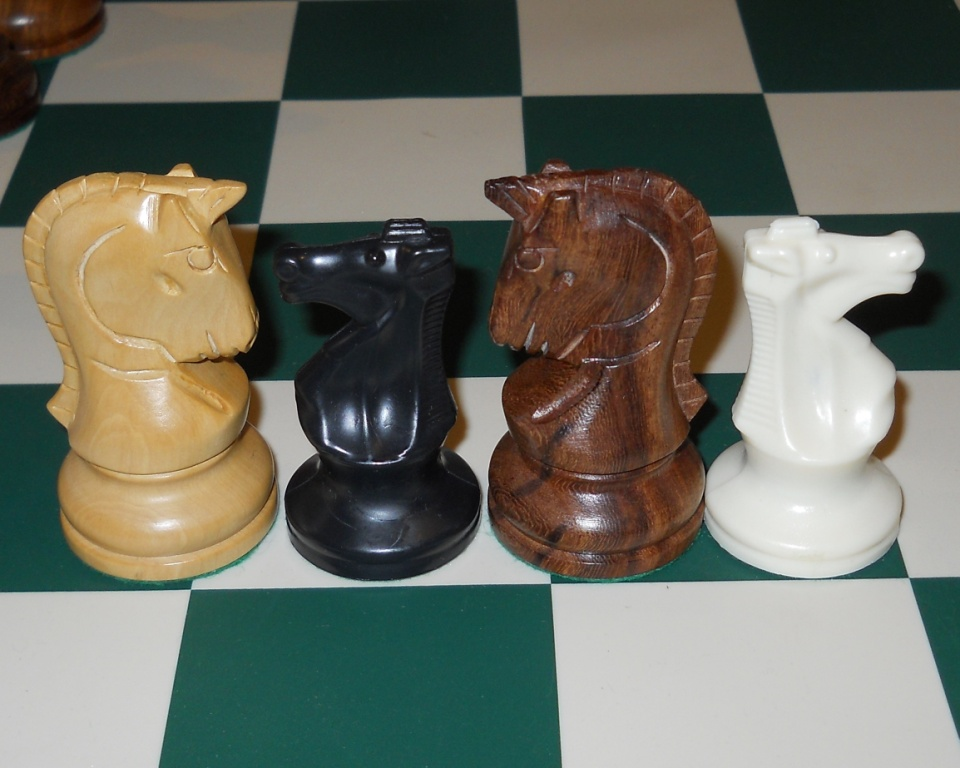
1950 Dubrovnik knights with Staunton knights side by side (from left: Dubrovnik, Staunton, Dubrovnik, Staunton)

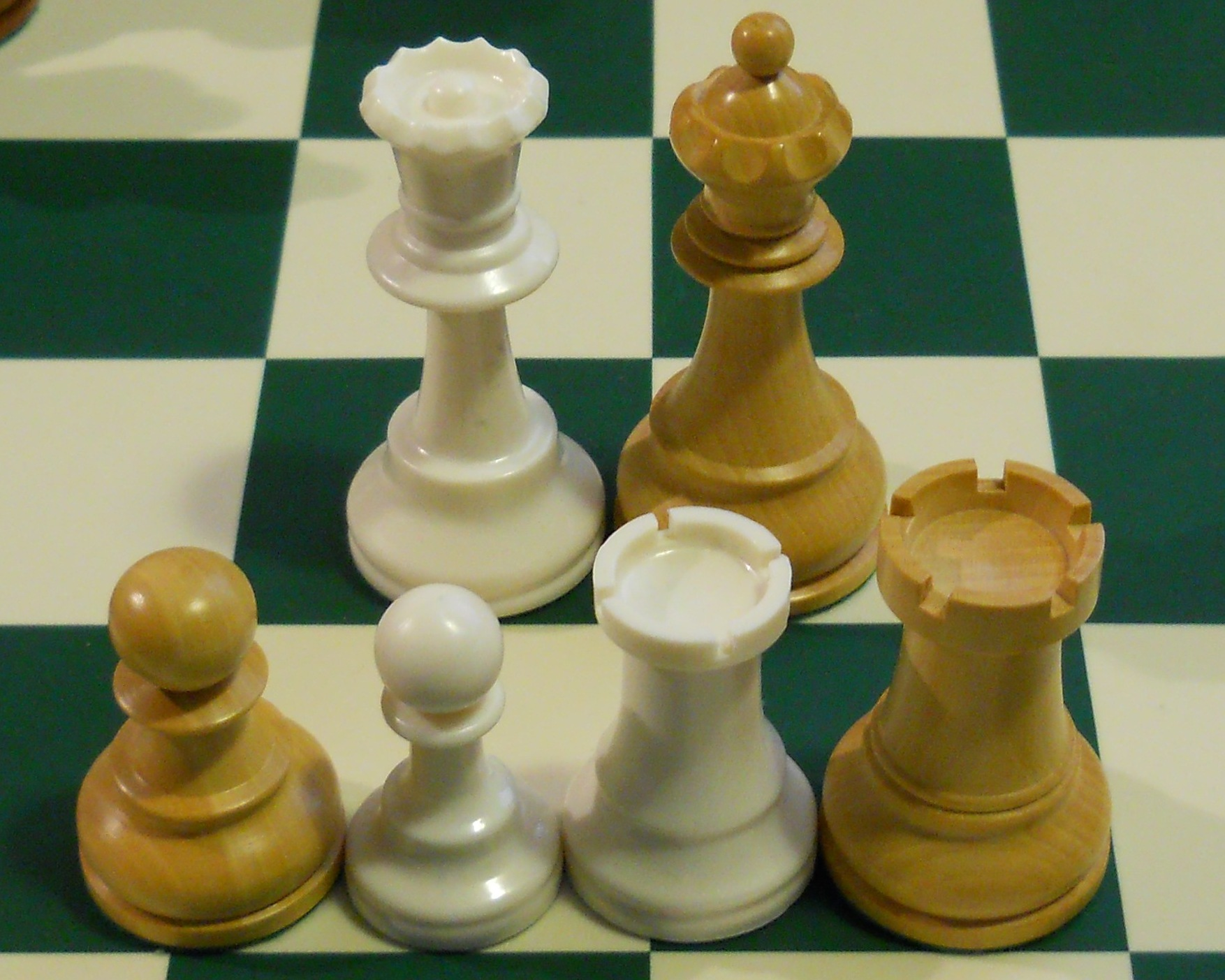
1950 Dubrovnik pawns, rooks, and queens with Staunton pieces side by side (clockwise from top left: Staunton queen, Dubrovnik queen, Dubrovnik rook, Staunton rook, Staunton pawn, Dubrovnik pawn)

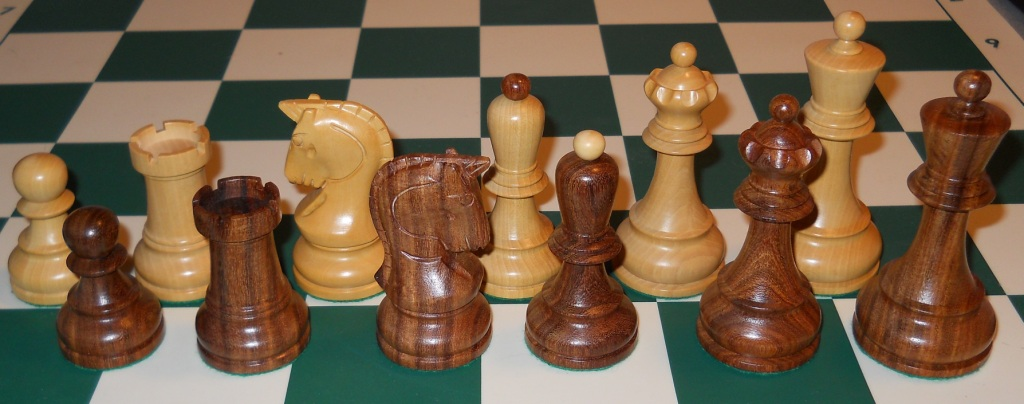
1950 Dubrovnik Chess Set manufactured 2015 by Chess Bazaar of India

== See also ==
- Makonde chess set
- Selenus chess set
- Staunton chess set
