= Jean Pruitt =

US-American Maryknoll sister and art promoter

Jean Pruitt

Jean Pruitt (17 October 1939 – 10 September 2017) was an American Maryknoll Sister operating in Dar es Salaam, Tanzania. She was best known for her activism in promoting Tanzanian art and defending Tanzanian children's rights. She worked with the Maryknoll Sisters and the Roman Catholic Church of Tanzania from 1969, and she received several awards for her contributions to Tanzanian society and culture.

== Early life ==
Pruitt completed her studies at the Nativity School in Los Angeles in 1953 and at the Bishop Conaty High School in 1957. In 1958, she joined the Maryknoll Sisters in Los Angeles, and by 1967 she graduated from Mary Rogers University (New York) with a bachelor's degree in education. The following year, she completed her studies in Social Works at the University at Buffalo in New York City.

== In Tanzania ==
In 1969, Pruitt was sent to Tanzania by the Maryknoll Sisters to work with the local Roman Catholic Church. She began her activity in Tanzania in the Catholic Relief Services, operating in favor of the healthy development of Tanzanian youth and children. Since her very early years in Tanzania, she founded a number of organizations intended to support young Tanzanian artists. The best known such organization is the Nyumba ya Sanaa (founded in 1972), an art workshop in Dar es Salaam. The same year she also founded the Tanzanian branch of Caritas, and in 1988 she was cofounder of the Tanzania Mozambique Friendship Association (TAMOFA). In 1992 she founded the Dogodogo Centre, an organization specifically established to support the increasing number of street children in Dar es Salaam city.

In 2000, Pruitt became Governor of the Global Network of Religions for Children (GNRC-Africa). In this organization she started several programs, including a successful "Education for Peace Program" for educating children and youth about diversity, tolerance and conflict resolution.

Pruitt was also one of the founding members of the Stepping Stone Trust Fund that supports vulnerable children and youth in Tanzania.

== Tanzanian artists promoted by her ==
Through her many activities in support of Tanzanian art, and especially so after opening the Nyumba ya Sanaa, Pruitt discovered a number of talents that later received national and international acclaim. The most notable such artist is the painter and sculptor George Lilanga. Patrick Francis Imanjama is another recognized artist, well known for his paintings, book drawing and etching abilities. Like Lilanga, Patrick Imanjama was supported by Pruitt and with her help was able to hold exhibitions in Germany, Austria and New York City. Other artists initially promoted by Pruitt include Augustino Malaba, Henry Likonde and Edward Kiiza.

== Awards ==
As an acknowledgement of her many contributions to the Tanzanian community, Pruitt has received several awards. In 1983 she was awarded the Tanzanian National Award by President Julius Nyerere for her contribution to the development of the Tanzanian Small Industries Development Organization (SIDO). On 17 December 2005 she also received the National ZEZE Award for her work in supporting Tanzanian artists and culture.
