= Lipico =

Ritual mask of the Makonde people

A lipico or lipiko (plural: mapico or mapiko) is a wooden East African mask for ceremonial dances of the Makonde people in Mozambique and Tanzania.

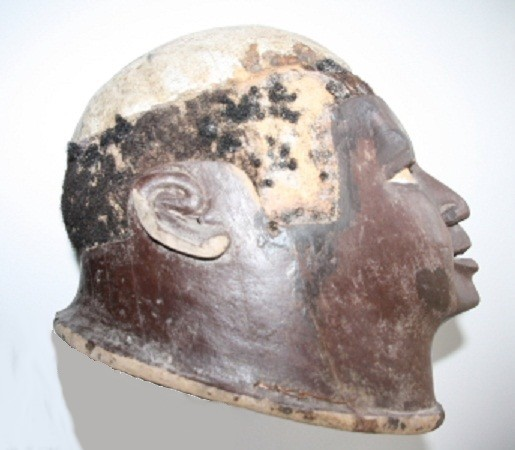
Lipico mask from Mozambique

== Description ==
Mapiko is a ceremonial dance originating with the Makonde people of Cabo Delgado province in northern Mozambique. Mapiko masks are worn during the rites of passage of circumcised boys. These wooden masks have been carved by master craftsmen, made of soft wood and sometimes feature human hair. They represent human heads and may feature labrets or scarifications.

== Gallery ==
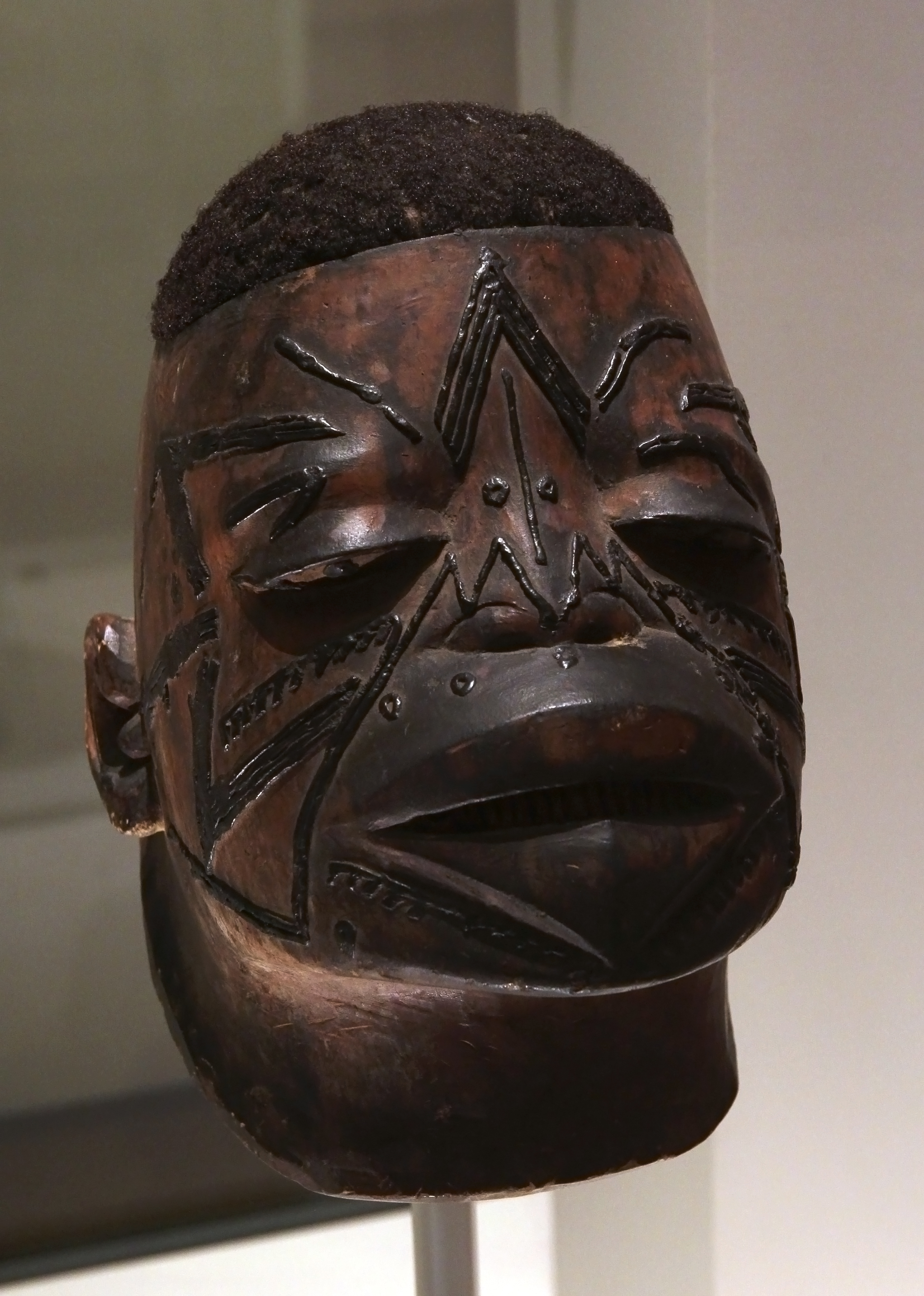
Lipico with scarifications, British Museum

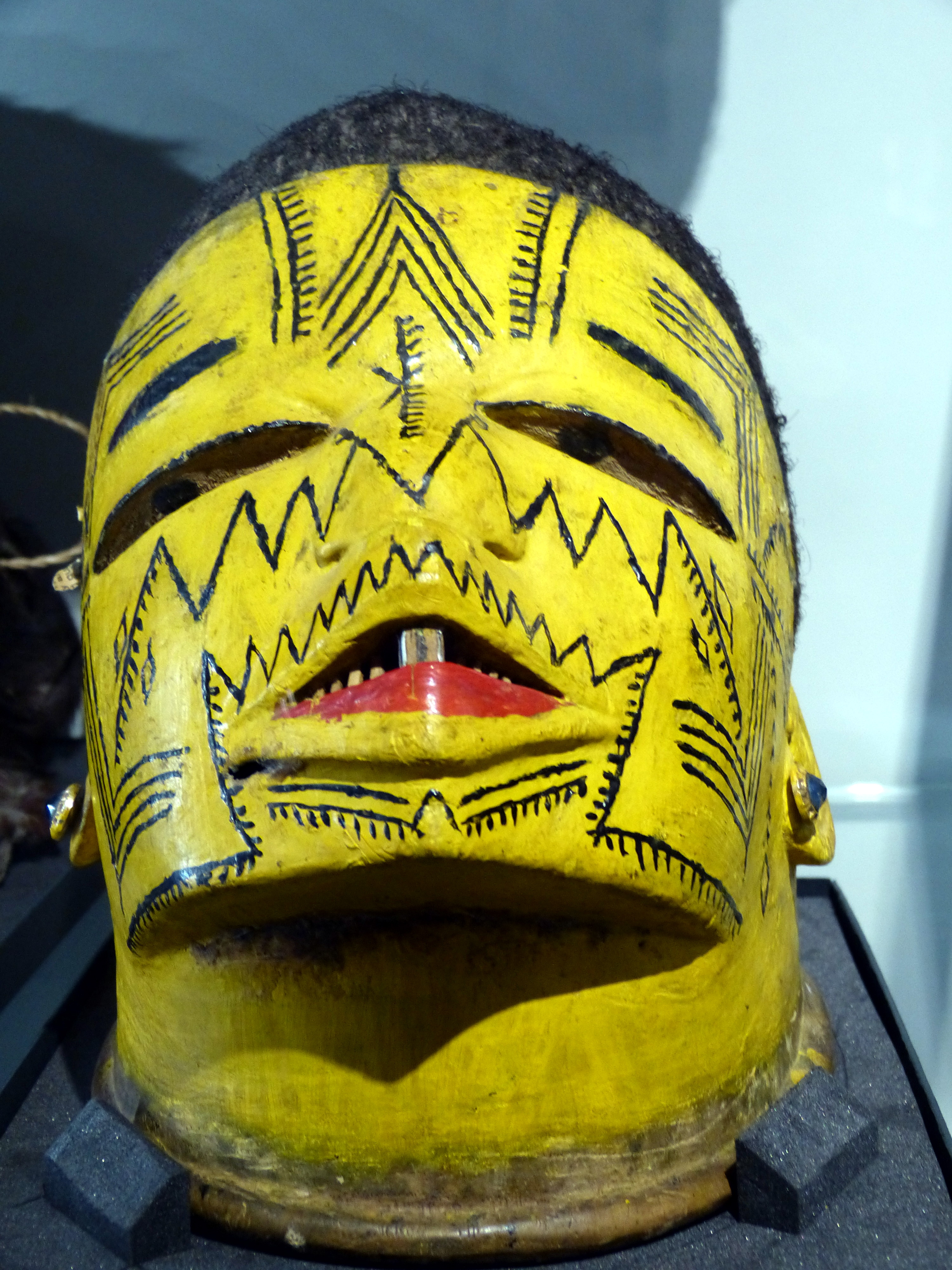
Lipico mask, UBC Museum of Anthropology ( Vancouver / Canada )

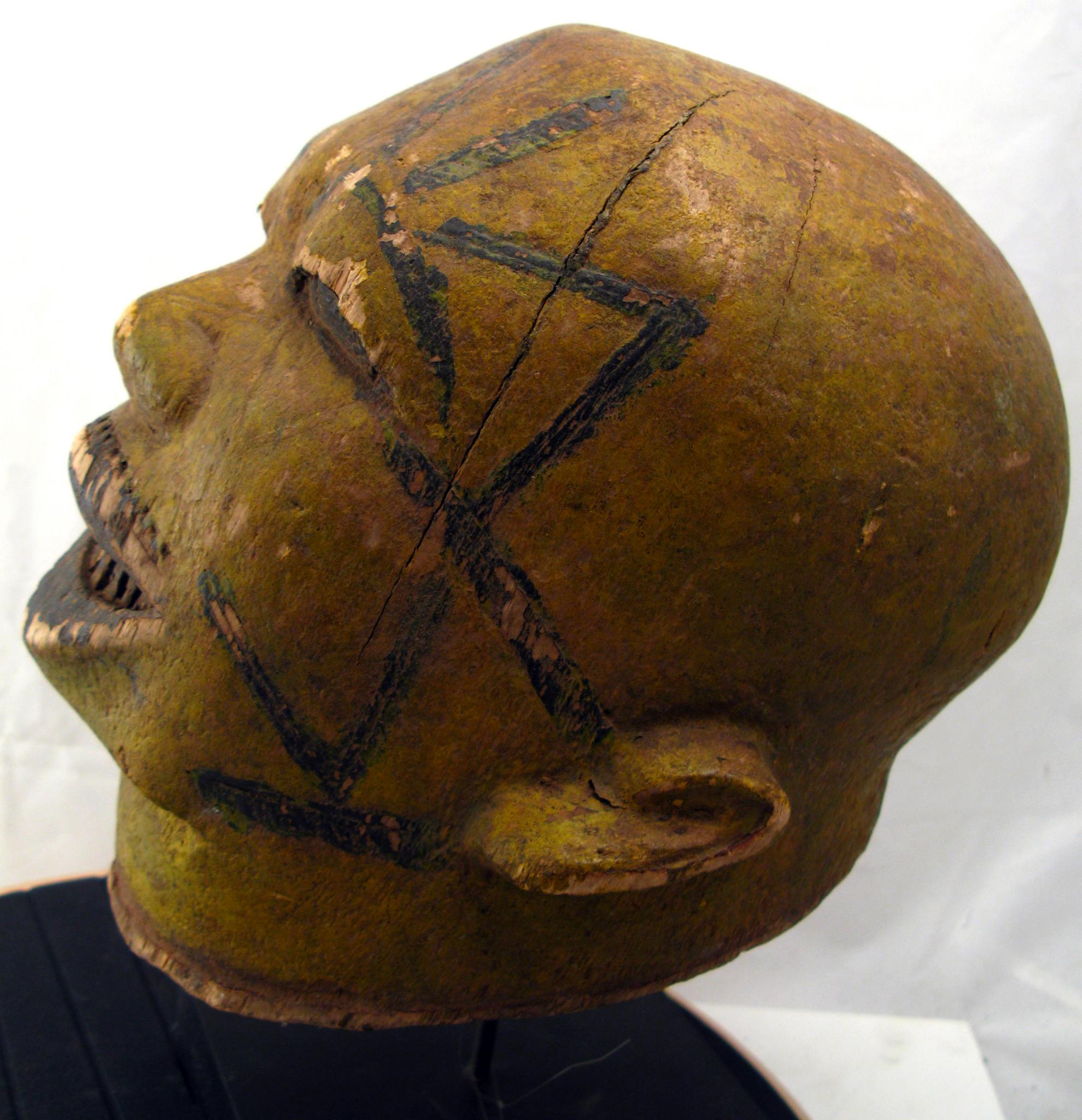
Lipico from the Makonde of Tanzania

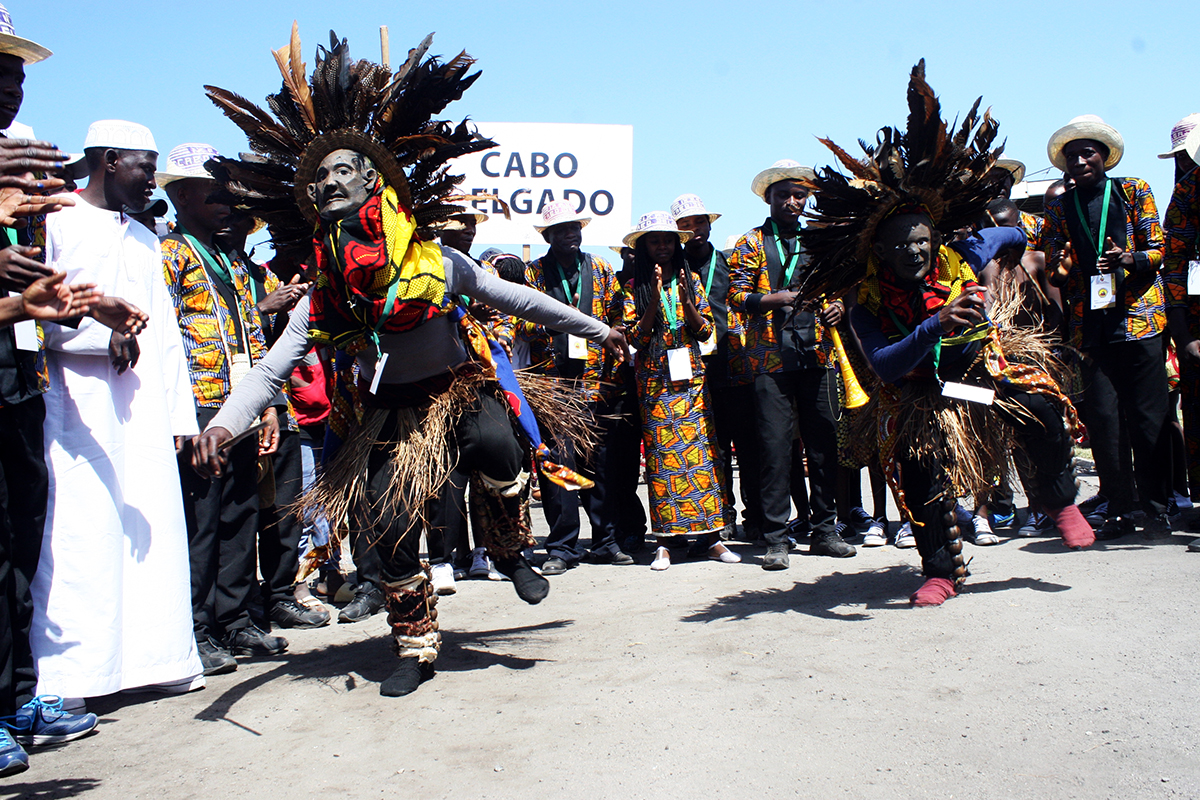
Mapico dancing
