= Shetani =

Spirits of East African mythology

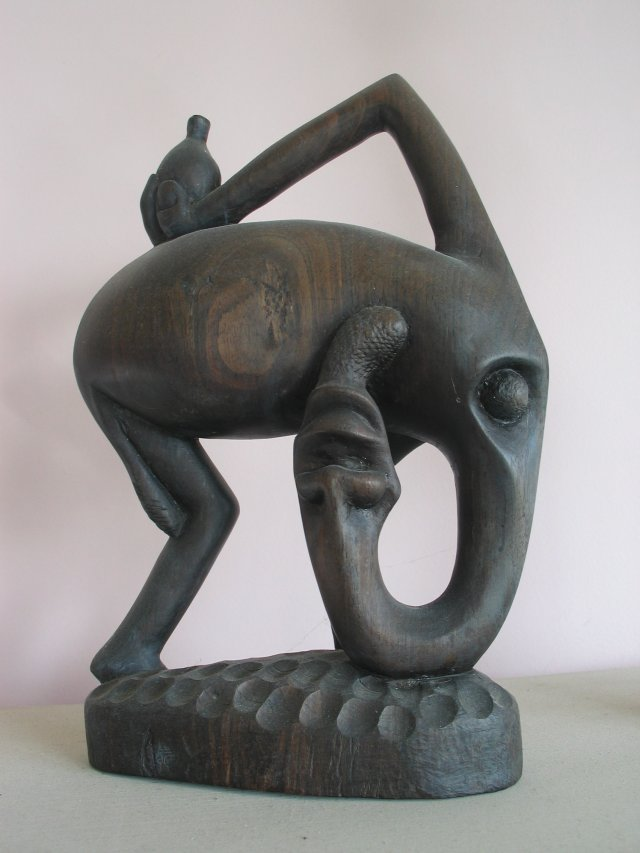
A Makonde elephant shetani

Shetani (the word is both singular and plural in English, the plural in Swahili is mashetani) are spirits of East African mythology and popular belief. Mostly malevolent, and found in many different forms and different types with different powers, shetani are a popular subject of carved artwork, especially by the Makonde people of Tanzania, Mozambique, and Kenya. Physically, shetani of various types appear as distorted human and animal figures.

There is a contemporary East African shetani cult, and reports of sightings of individual shetani are cyclical, with Popo Bawa panics having occurred in 1995 in Zanzibar and 2007 in Dar es Salaam.

The influential Makonde artist George Lilanga (1934–2005) gained world renown with his shetani sculptures and paintings. Samaki Likankoa, master carver in Tanzania was the foremost originator of the shetani style in the early 1950s. Mohamed Peera, an Indian art curator was a major patron and influence to many makonde carvers such as Samaki, and played a decisive role in the abstract shetani makonde movement from the early 1950s to 1970s.

== Etymology ==
A Swahili word used in various East African nations to refer to mostly malevolent native Islamic spirits, shetani (pl. mashetani), is a borrowing from the Arabic, Shaitan, meaning devil, or, more specifically, adversary. The word is cognate with the English word Satan which comes ultimately from the same Semitic root.

== Nature and types ==
There are many types of shetani, with various attributes, and they take on many forms; abstract, animal, anthropomorphic and combinations thereof. Whether one-legged or one-armed, cyclopic or with exaggerated orifices and appendages, the essential nature of the shetani is a distorted, asymmetrical human figure, a common world archetype, A typical carving, done in ebony or African blackwood, might have "one eye, a toothless, open mouth and a body which was bent over backwards with its head facing the wrong way."

There are various classes of shetani. Examples include the dangerous ukunduka, which feed through sexual intercourse, and the chameleon shetani, a carnivore with exaggerated habits of the lizard, or the harmless medicinal shuluwele which gathers herbs for sorcerers.

Some spirits, like the "exceptionally evil" Popo Bawa ('bat-wing'), associated with "dirt and violent sodomy" and the smell of burnt sulphur, are individuals with horrifying living reputations. According to the BBC in 2001, "Many Zanzibaris are now refusing to sleep in their houses as they believe it only preys on people in the comfort of their own beds. . . . [P]eople believe that it sodomises its victims, most of whom are men."

== Shetani cult ==
Belief in shetani is a contemporary continuation of pre-Islamic belief. In addition to the Makonde who carry on a tradition of sculpture, other peoples, such as the Segeju of Tanzania, who recognize eight or ten tribes of spirits, with each individual having its own name and personality, carry on belief in shetani possession and exorcism.

According to the Zanzibar Bradt Travel Guide, "There is no real way, say the locals, of protecting yourself from the possibility of being haunted or attacked by a shetani. The best thing is simply to keep out of their way and try to make sure they keep out of yours – for example by hanging a piece of paper, inscribed with special Arabic verses, from the ceiling of the house. Almost every home or shop in Zanzibar has one of these brown, mottled scraps, attached to a roof beam by a piece of cotton."

== Art and popular culture ==
The depiction of shetani continues in the flourishing Makonde sculpture trade, varying from "airport art" knockoffs to fine art found in such venues as the Hamburg Mawingu Collection.

=== George Lilanga ===
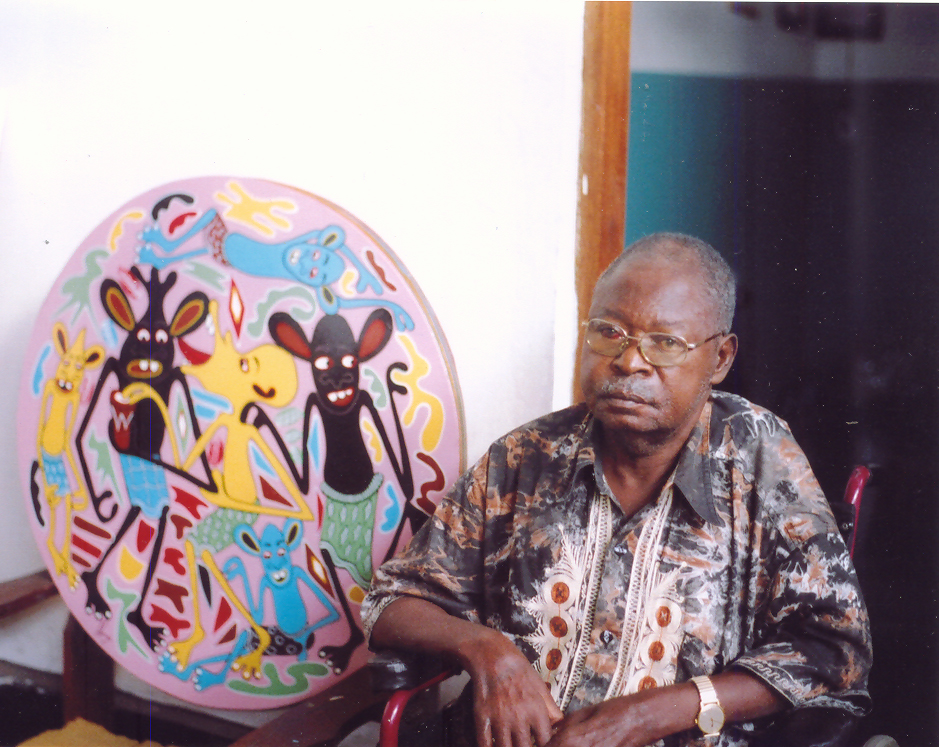
George Lilanga with We banana anangalia ulimi kiangu unawasha ("Banana look to me, I have the mouth-watering")

George Lilanga (1934–2005) was a Tanzanian sculptor and artist of the Makonde tribe who lived in Dar es Salaam. His work was exhibited in international expositions of African contemporaries including Africa Remix in Düsseldorf, Paris, London and Tokyo.

In the 1970s, Lilanga participated in a collective exhibition of African artists in Washington D.C. Of the 280 works presented, about 100 were by Lilanga. It was on this occasion that he was compared with Jean Dubuffet. Lilanga was considered to have had an influence on the young American graffiti artists; Keith Haring said in an interview that he had been influenced by Lilanga's art. Lilanga began a long series of exhibitions. His works had increasing success in Africa, Europe, the US, India and Japan. In the 1980s, he dedicated himself almost exclusively to painting. His shetani were represented two-dimensionally on Masonite and, later, on Faesite.

The Hamburg Mawingu Collection posthumously published a systematically and thematically complete collection of Lilanga's work, and his work forms the backbone of their collection.

=== Into the Out Of ===
In Alan Dean Foster's 1986 horror/fantasy novel, Into the Out Of, elders of the Maasai people become aware that from the south of them in the Ruaha wilderness of Tanzania a global crisis is approaching. Malevolent shetani, which originate from a dimensional portal known to the Maasai as the “Out Of” (because all things, such as humans, animals and plants, originally came "out of" it), are finding their way into this world. In addition to general sabotage, the shetani are fomenting trouble between the superpowers, intent on inciting war. If not prevented, the barriers between the two dimensions will be permanently breached and uncountable hordes of shetani will overrun the world, enslaving the few humans they do not exterminate.

== See also ==
- African art
- Culture of Mozambique
- Culture of Tanzania
- Makonde art
- Shaytani (شیطانی)
