= Razdol'noye, Kazakhstan =

Razdol'noye
- Location in Kazakhstan
- Coordinates: 43°20′42″N 77°13′46″E
- Country: Kazakhstan
- Region: Almaty Region
- Time zone: UTC+6 (Omsk Time)

Razdol’noye is a village in Almaty Region of south-eastern Kazakhstan.
